= Shiraz =

City in Fars province, Iran

Shiraz شیراز (Persian) The City of Gardens
- City
- Shiraz
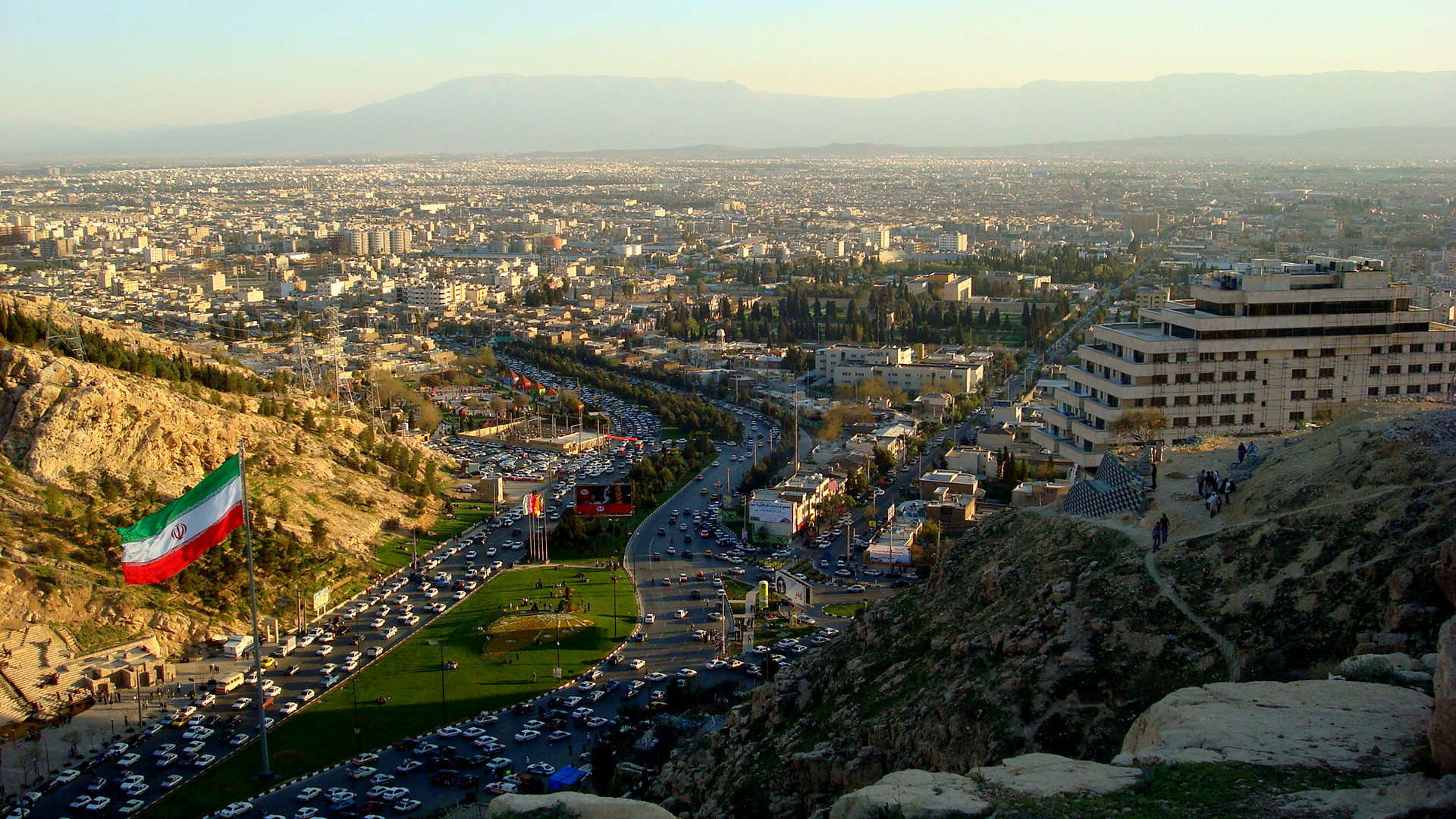
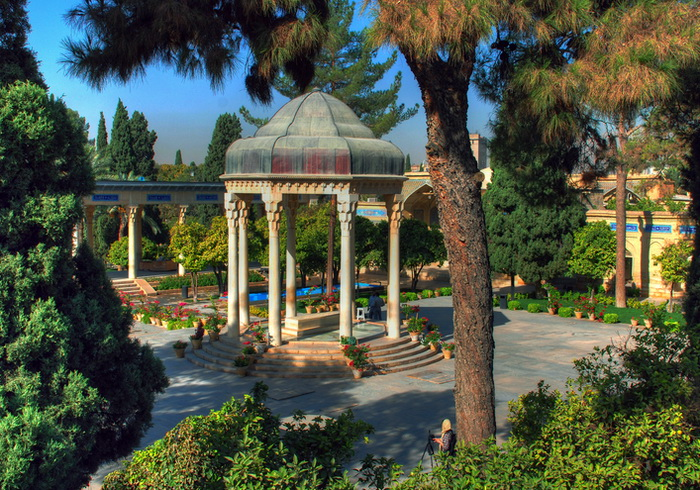
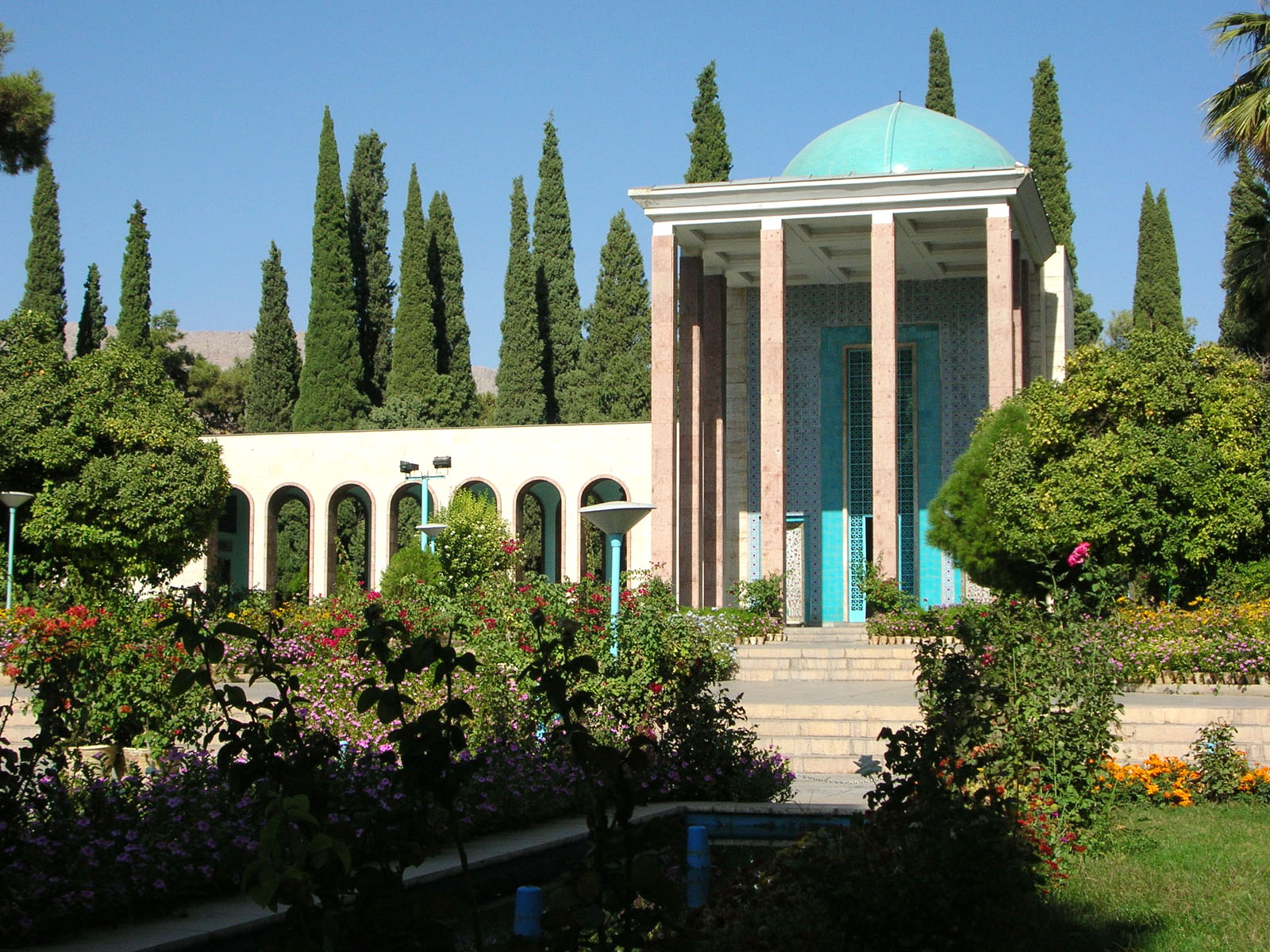
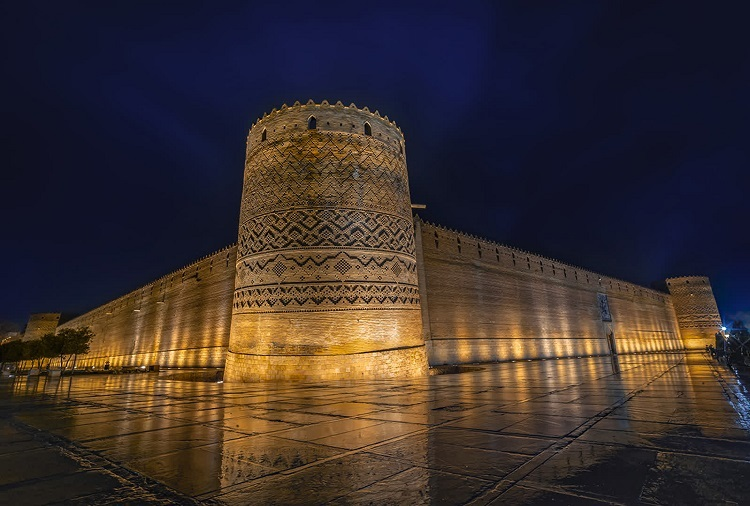
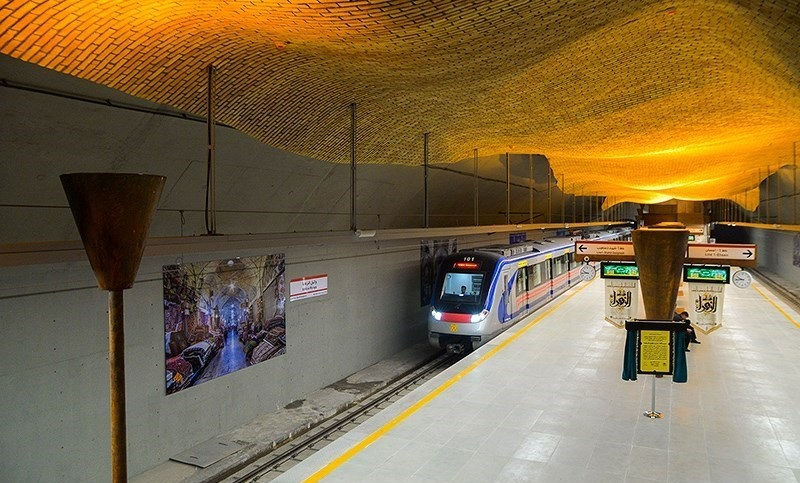
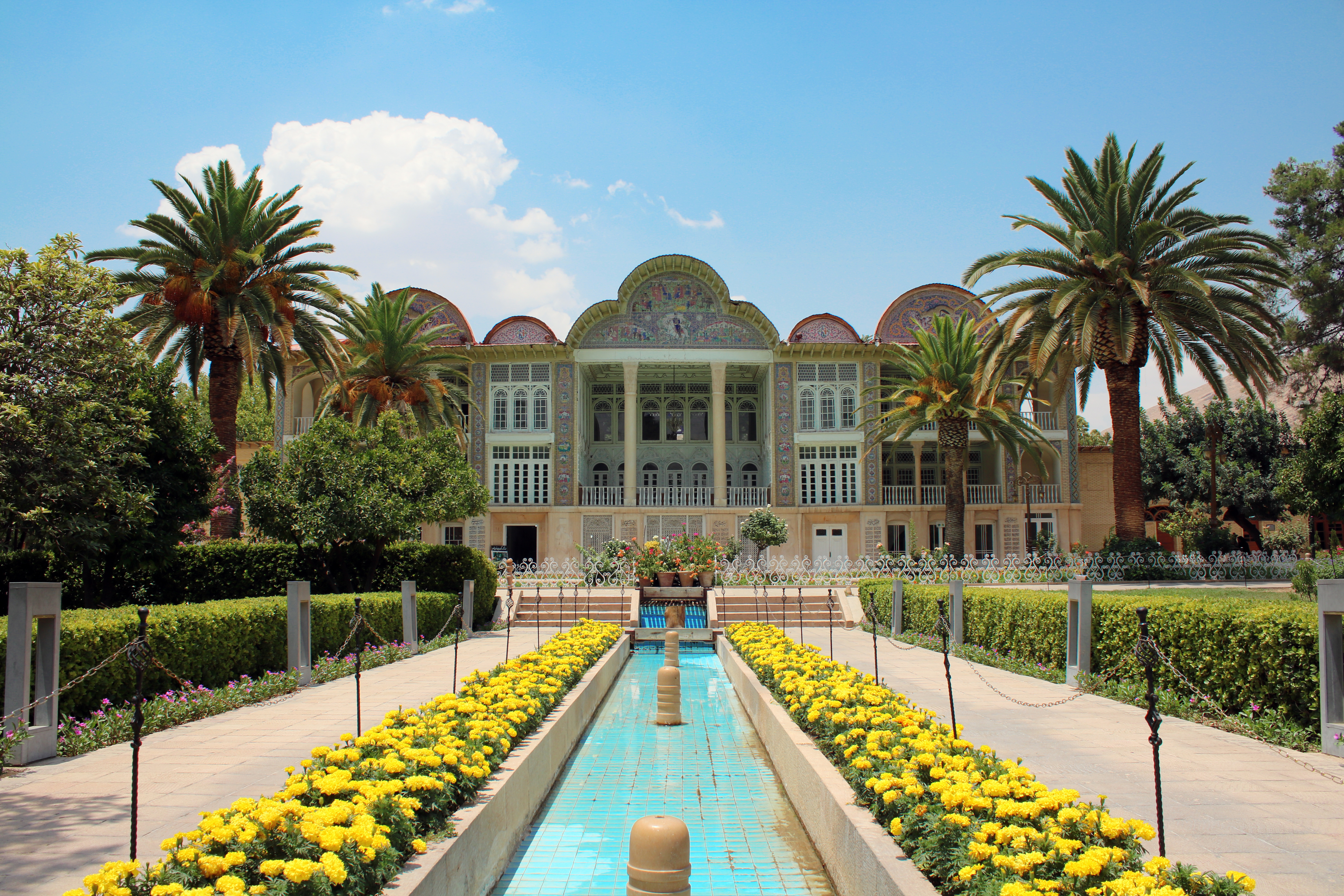
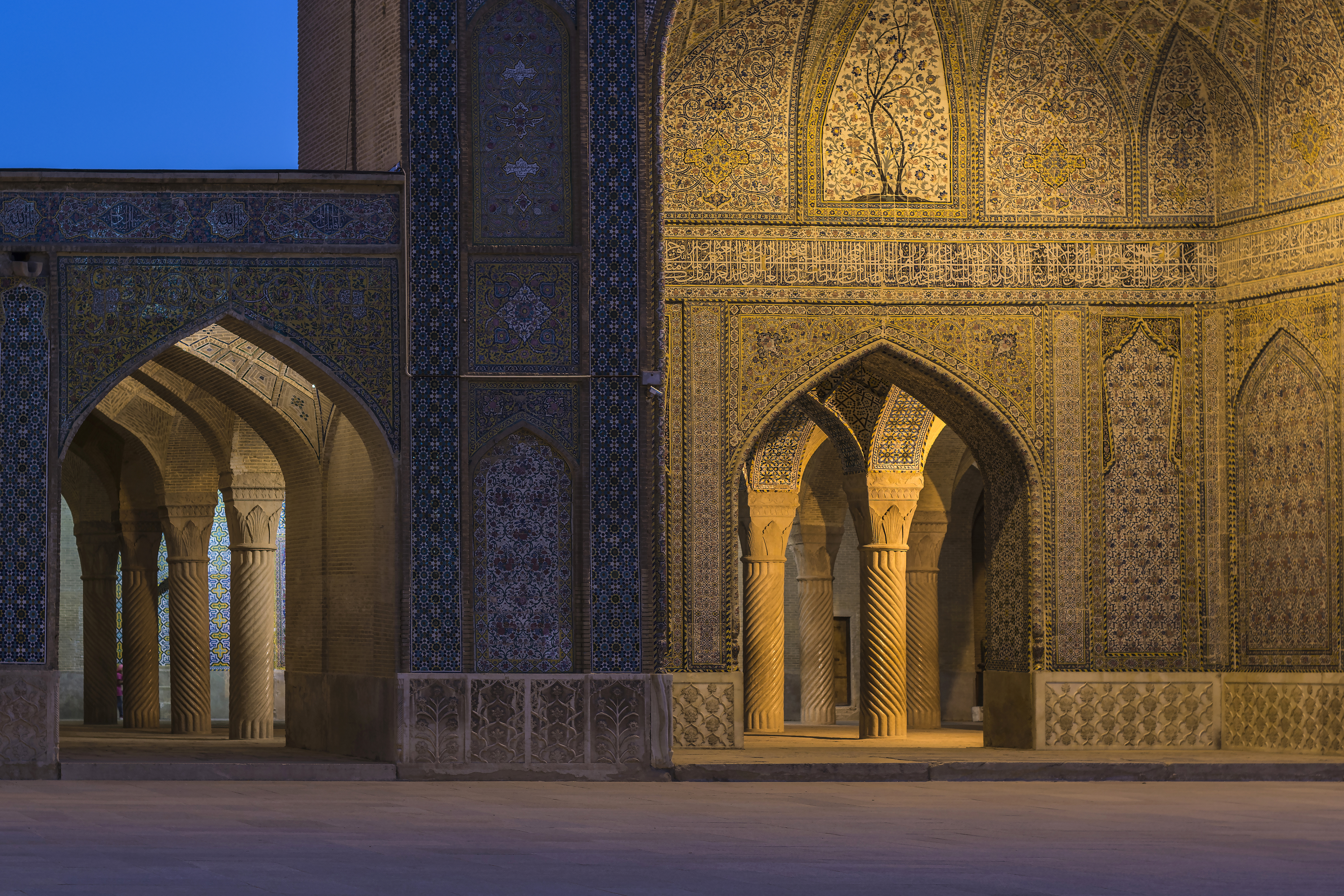
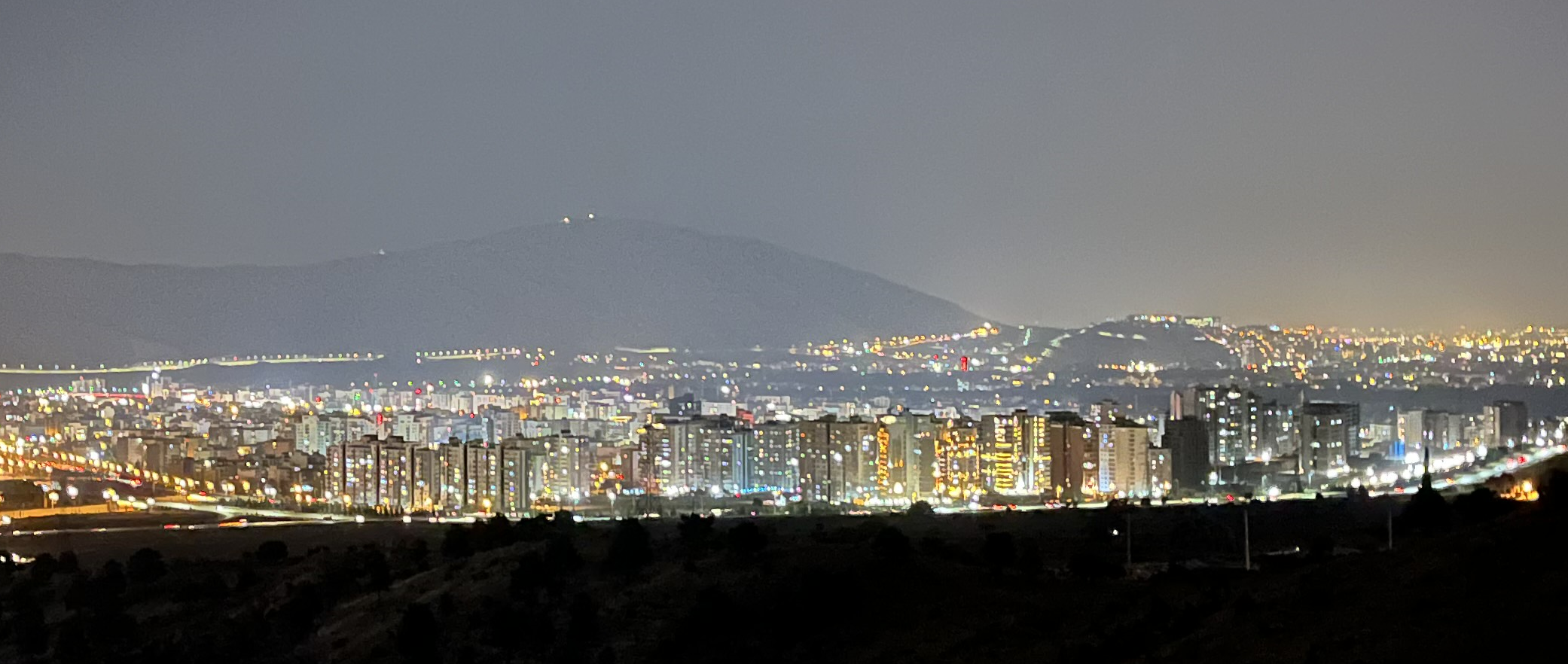
- Skyline of Shiraz at day Tomb of Hafez Tomb of Saadi Karim Khan Citadel Shiraz Metro Eram Garden Vakil Mosque Skyline of Shiraz at night

- Flag Seal
- Nickname: City of Gardens
- Location of Shiraz within Iran Shiraz (Middle East) Shiraz (Asia)
- Coordinates: 29°36′36″N 52°32′33″E
- Country: Iran
- Province: Fars
- County: Shiraz
- District: Central

Government
  - Type: City Council
  - Mayor: Mohammad Hassan Asadi

Area
  - City: 240 km^{2} (93 sq mi)
  - Land: 240 km^{2} (93 sq mi)
  - Water: 0 km^{2} (0 sq mi) 0%
- Elevation: 1,500 m (4,900 ft)

Population (2016 census)
  - Density: 6,670/km^{2} (17,300/sq mi)
  - Urban: 1,565,572
  - Metro: 1,800,000
  - Population rank: 5th (Iran)
- Time zone: UTC+03:30 (IRST)
- Area code: 071
- Routes: Freeway 7 Road 65; Road 67; Road 86; Road 744
- License plate: 63, 83, 93
- Website: shiraz.ir

Shiraz (Note: /ʃɪˈrɑːz/ shih-RAHZ; Persian: شیراز, pronounced [ʃiːˈɹɒːz]) is the fifth-most-populous city of Iran (Note: After Tehran, Mashhad, Esfahan and Karaj; in 2016 Shiraz had a total population of 1,565,572) and the capital of Fars province, which is historically known by the exonym Persia proper. As of the 2016 national census, the population of the city was 1,565,572 people, and its built-up area with Sadra was home to almost 1,800,000 inhabitants. A census in 2021 showed an increase in the city's population to 1,995,500 people. Shiraz is located in southwestern Iran on the rudkhaneye khoshk (lit. 'dry river') seasonal river. The city has a moderate climate and has been a regional trade center for over a thousand years.

The earliest reference to the city, as Tiraziš, is on Elamite clay tablets dated to 2000 BCE. The modern city was founded by the Sasanian dynasty and restored by the Umayyad Caliphate in 693 CE and grew prominent under the successive Iranian Saffarid and Buyid dynasties in the 9th and 10th–11th centuries, respectively. In the 13th century, Shiraz became a leading center of the arts and letters, due to the encouragement of its ruler and the presence of multiple Persian scholars and artists. Two famous poets of Iran, Hafez and Saadi, are from Shiraz, whose tombs are located on the north side of the current city boundaries.

Shiraz is one of the top tourist cities in Iran, visited by people from around the world, and is known as the city of poets, literature, and flowers. It is also considered by some Iranians to be the city of gardens due to the presence of a number of gardens and fruit trees that can be seen throughout the city, such as Eram Garden. Shiraz has historically had major Jewish and Christian communities. The crafts of Shiraz consist of inlaid mosaic work of triangular design; silverware; pile carpet-weaving and weaving of kilim, called gilim and jajim in the villages and among the tribes. Dominant industries in the city include the production of cement, sugar, fertilizers, textile products, wood products, metalwork, and rugs. Shiraz also has a major oil refinery and is a major centre for Iran's electronic industries: 53 percent of Iran's electronic investment has been centred in Shiraz. The city is home to Iran's first solar powerplant.

== Etymology ==
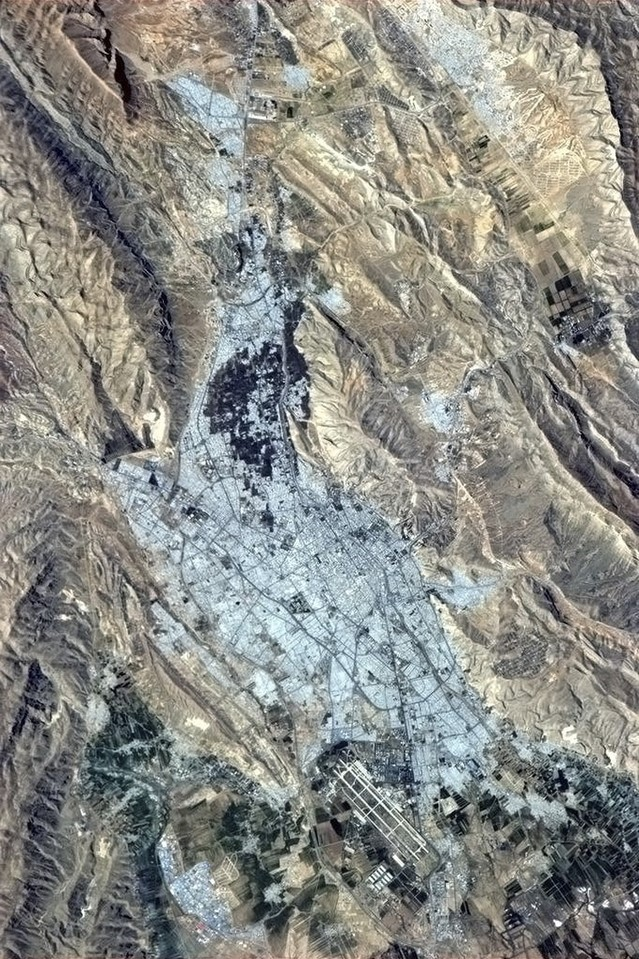
Shiraz in a photo by Canadian astronaut Chris Hadfield from the ISS on 20 March 2013 (1392 Nowruz)

Several tablets from the Persepolis treasury archives, written in the Elamite language, mention major workshops in T/Ši-ra-iz-iz-iš (read T/Širazziš), which is the ancient form of the name Shiraz. Phonetically, this is interpreted as /tiračis/ or /ćiračis/. This name became Old Persian /širājiš/; through regular sound change comes the modern Persian name Shirāz. The name Shiraz also appears on clay sealings found at a 2nd-century CE Sasanian ruin, east of the city. According to the Iranian linguist Zana Salehrad, the name Shiraz may derive from an ancient term meaning "sunlit plain" or "bright land", reflecting the region’s fertile terrain and favorable climate. This etymology suggests that the city’s name originally conveyed its natural abundance and strategic significance in southwestern Iran.

== History ==
=== Pre-Islamic era ===
Though there is no definitive record of its existence prior to the late 7th century CE, a few archaeological finds dating from 1933 and beyond indicate that the site or vicinity of Shiraz was likely settled in the pre-Islamic era as early as the 6th century BCE. A number of Achaemenid and Sasanian-era remains have been discovered around the city, including reliefs at Barm-e Delak to the east and Guyim to the northwest, and ruins of Sasanian fortresses at Qasr-e Abu Nasr to the east and Fahandezh. The latter is identified with the fortress of Shahmobad mentioned as being in Shiraz by the 10th-century geographical work, Hudud al-'alam. The Sasanian and early Islamic-era clay seals found at Qasr-e Abunasr mention the name "Shiraz" alongside the name of the Sasanian administrative district of the area, Ardashir-Khwarrah. According to the diplomat and academic John Limbert, this indicates that the name "Shiraz" is traced back to the Elamite "Shirrazish" and that both refer to a settlement that existed at the site of Qasr-e Abunasr.

Interpretations of what type of settlement ancient Shiraz was vary. According to Berney and Ring, the lack of references to Shiraz in early Persian sources suggests the city could not have been more than a way-station in the plain in which it lies. On the other hand, according to Abdolmajed Arfaee, Achaemenid-era Shiraz must have been one of the most important settlements in the area. He bases this on its frequent appearance in the Persepolis Administrative Archives (84 different tablets) as well as the number of workers present – in groups as large as 490. Most textual references to Shiraz involve rations for workers; it is never mentioned as a travel destination. Arfaee says that Sasanian Shiraz was relatively insignificant before its re-foundation in the early Islamic period. According to John Limbert, however, Shiraz prospered between the 6th and 8th centuries CE and was possibly the administrative center for the Shiraz plain until the modern city of Shiraz was founded.

=== Early Islamic era ===
Shiraz was founded or restored in 693 by Muhammad ibn Yusuf al-Thaqafi, the brother of the Umayyad viceroy of the eastern half of the caliphate, al-Hajjaj ibn Yusuf, or the latter's kinsman Muhammad ibn Qasim. The Arab Muslim army had conquered the wider region of Fars, where the site of Shiraz is located, in several expeditions launched from their garrison town of Basra between 640 and 653, and specifically captured the immediate area around Shiraz early on, in 641. This area did not possess any cities, though there were a number of forts which were forced to pay tribute to the Arabs. The Sasanians held firm in Istakhr, their capital in Fars, until the Arabs captured it in a heavy battle in 653, during which the plain of Shiraz had been utilized as an Arab campground. Because of Istakhr's deep association with the Sasanian Empire and the Zoroastrian religion, the Arabs sought to establish in nearby Shiraz a rival cultural and administrative center. Thus, during its initial founding in 693, the city was planned to be much larger than Isfahan. However, the initial ambitions were not realized and Shiraz remained a "provincial backwater" in the shadow of Istakhr until at least the late 9th century, according to Limbert. This is partly attributed to the reticence of the largely Zoroastrian population of Fars to inhabit the Islamic Arab city. As the population gradually shifted to Islam from Zoroastrianism and Istakhr concurrently declined, Shiraz grew into the practical center of Fars.

According to Muslim traditional sources, Shiraz was used as a hideout by three of the brothers of the Shia Muslim imam Ali al-Ridha following the latter's death in 817/18 and later by one of the brothers' sons, Ali ibn Hamza ibn Musa, until he was found and executed by the Abbasid authorities in c. 835. As Abbasid authority waned during this period, regional dynasties emerged with considerable autonomy. In the late 9th century, the Iranian Muslim Saffarid dynasty under Ya'qub ibn al-Layth made Shiraz the capital of their autonomous state, which encompassed most of modern-day Iran. In 894, Ya'qub's brother and successor, Amr, founded the city's first congregational mosque, today known as the Atigh Jame' Mosque.

The Iranian Buyid dynasty under Imad al-Dawla Ali ibn Buya ousted the Saffarids in 933 and his nephew and successor, 'Adud al-Dawla Fana Khusraw, took over and ruled Fars between 949 and 983, and added Iraq, the seat of the Abbasid Caliphate, to his Shiraz-based domains in 977; the Abbasids thenceforth became a puppet state of the Shiraz-based dynasty. Shiraz developed into the largest and most prosperous city of Fars and an important economic and cultural center of the caliphate. Adud al-Dawla had a large library, a hospital and several mosques, bazaars, caravanserais, palaces and gardens built in the city, while south of it he erected a fortified camp for his troops, known as Kard Fana Khusraw, in 974. One of the congregational mosques built by Adud al-Dawla has survived until the present day. Two Zoroastrian fire temples also existed in Shiraz, catering to the Persians who had not converted to Islam. One of Adud al-Dawla's palaces stretched out for nearly three miles and consisted of 360 rooms.

Under the Buyids, Shiraz was divided into twelve quarters and had eight gates. It owed its economic prosperity to the booming agricultural trade of Fars. The city largely consumed the agricultural products of the province, including grapes, linen, wool, cotton, collyrium, rose, violet and palm-blossom water. It was also a market for rug weavers and painters to sell their pricey products, a testament to the residents' wealth. At the time, wine, grains, gold and silver were exported from the Persian port cities of Siraf and Najairam. Adud al-Dawla patronized scientific, medical and Islamic religious research in Shiraz.

Benjamin of Tudela reported that Shiraz had 10,000 Jews in 1170.

The city was spared destruction by the invading Mongols, when its local ruler offered tributes and submission to Genghis Khan. Shiraz was again spared by Tamerlane, when in 1382 the local monarch, Shah Shoja agreed to submit to the invader. In the 13th century, Shiraz became a leading center of the arts and letters, thanks to the encouragement of its ruler and the presence of a number of Persian scholars and artists. For this reason the city was named by classical geographers Dar al-'Elm, the House of Knowledge. Among the Iranian poets, mystics and philosophers born in Shiraz were the poets Sa'di and Hafez, the mystic Ruzbehan, and the philosopher Mulla Sadra. Thus Shiraz has been nicknamed "The Athens of Iran". As early as the 11th century, several hundred thousand people inhabited Shiraz. In the 14th century, Shiraz had 60,000 inhabitants. During the 16th century, it had a population of 200,000 people, which by the mid-18th century had decreased to only 55,000.

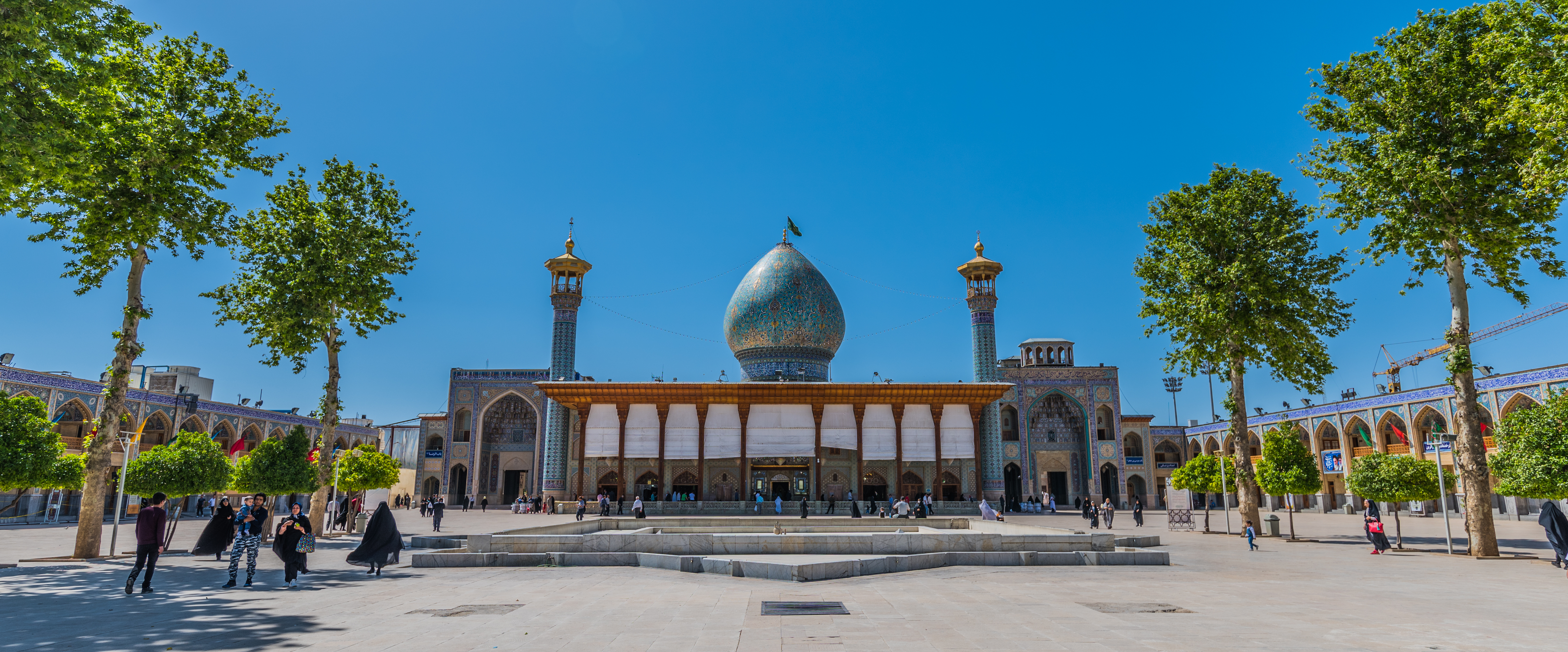
The shrine of Shah Cheragh houses the remains of Sayyid Ahmad, son of Imam Musa al-Kazim

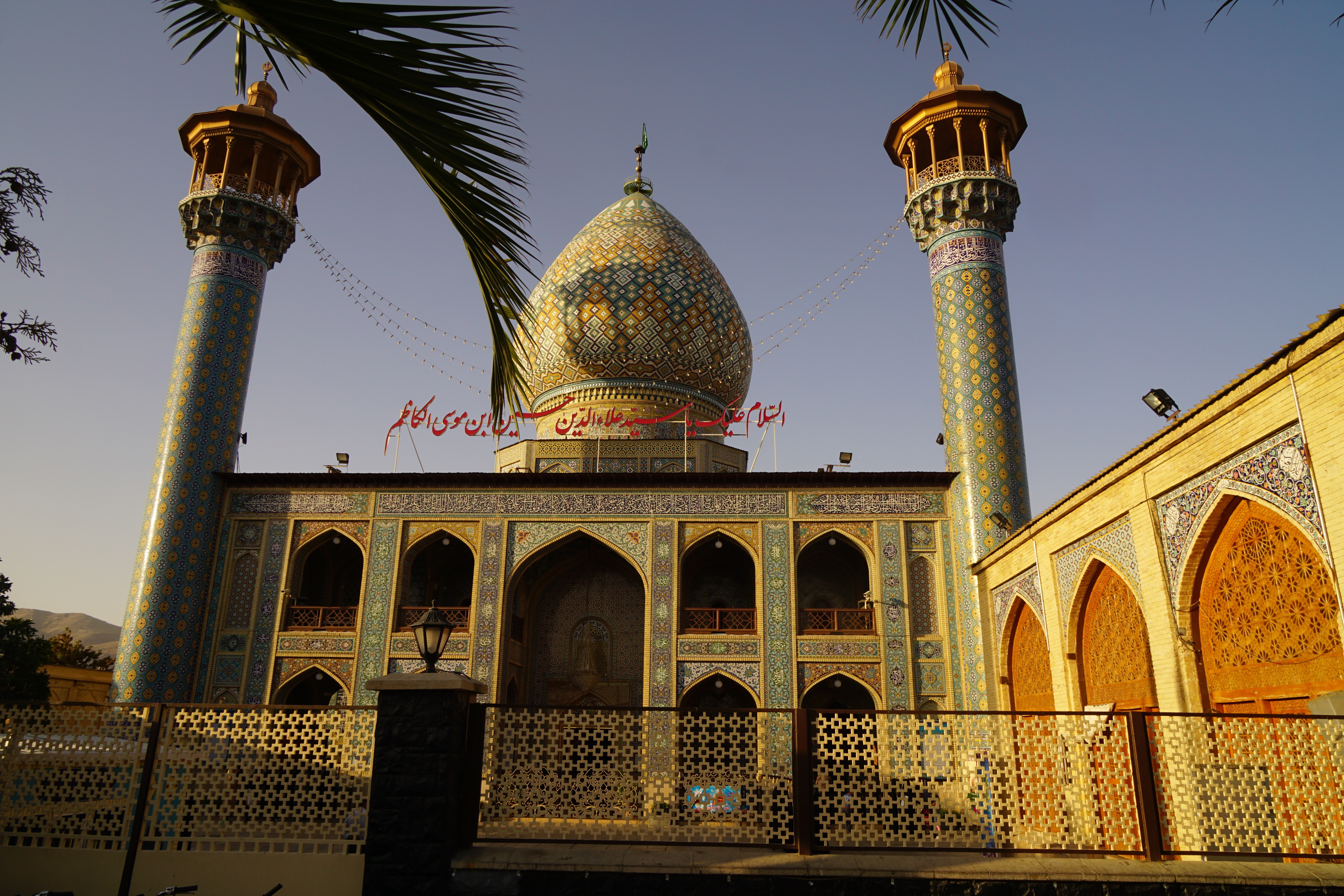
Tomb of Seyed Alaeddin Husayn, brother of Sayyid Ahmad nearby

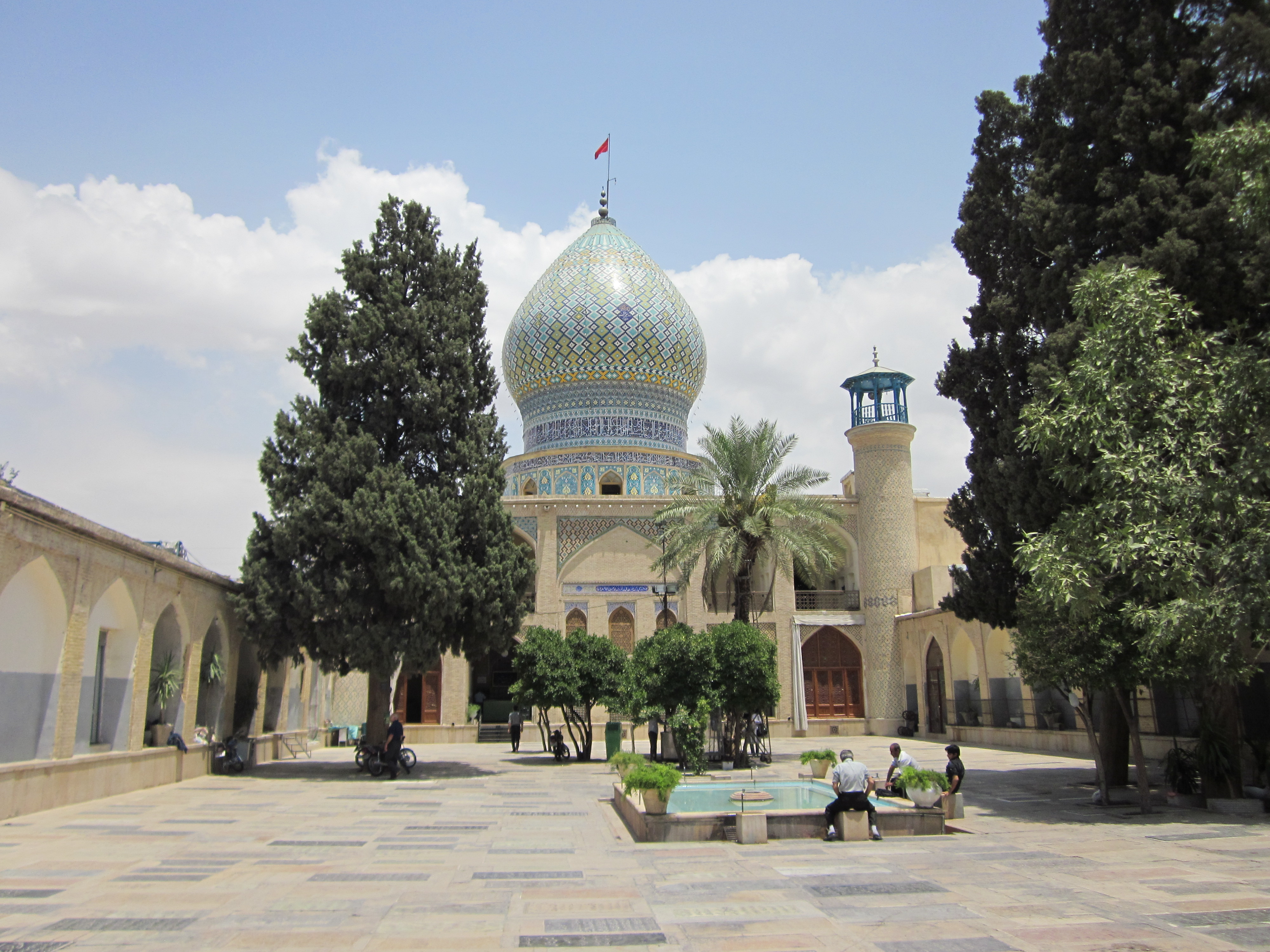
Imamzadeh Ali ibn Hamzah, nephew of Shah Cheragh and Imam Reza.

=== Safavids and later dynasties ===
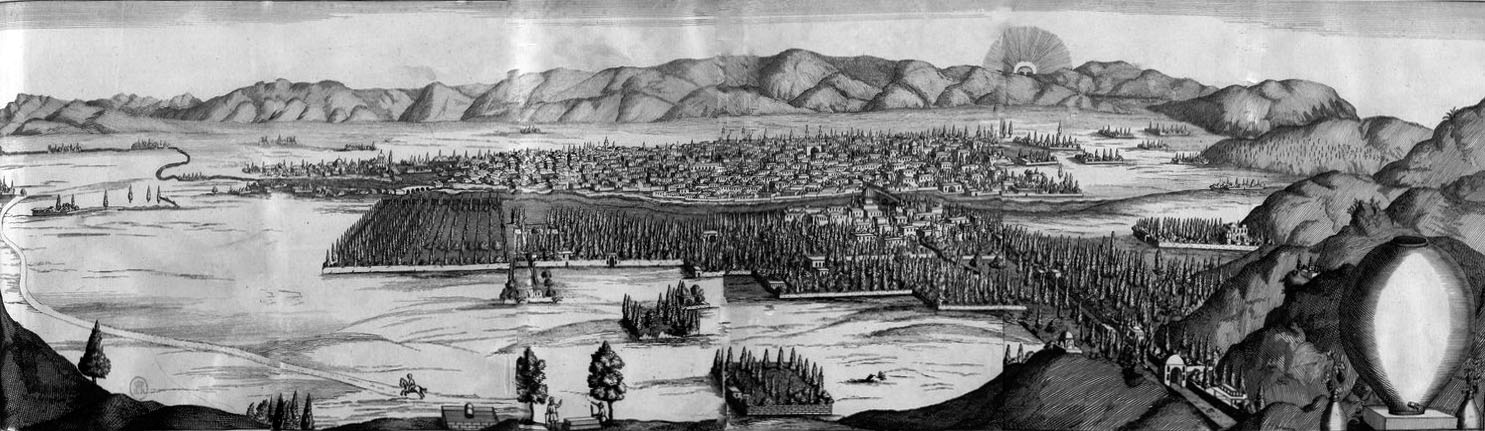
An illustration of Shiraz by French traveler Jean Chardin in 1670s while he was travelling through the Safavid Empire

In 1504, Shiraz was captured by the forces of Ismail I, the founder of the Safavid Dynasty. Throughout the Safavid Empire (1501–1722), Shiraz remained a provincial capital, and Emam Qoli Khan, the governor of Fars under Abbas the Great, constructed a number of palaces and ornate buildings in the same style as those built during the same period in Isfahan, the capital of the Empire. After the fall of the Safavids, Shiraz suffered a period of decline, worsened by the raids of the Afghans and the rebellion of its governor against Nader Shah; the latter sent troops to suppress the revolt. The city was besieged for many months and eventually sacked. At the time of Nader Shah's murder in 1747, most of the historical buildings of the city were damaged or ruined, and its population fell to 50,000, one-quarter of that during the 16th century.

Shiraz soon returned to prosperity under the rule of Karim Khan Zand, who made it his capital in 1762. Employing more than 12,000 workers, he constructed a royal district with a fortress, multiple administrative buildings, a mosque, and one of the finest covered bazaars in Iran. He had a moat built around the city, constructed an irrigation and drainage system, and rebuilt the city walls. However, Karim Khan's heirs failed to secure his gains. When Agha Mohammad Khan, the founder of the Qajar dynasty, eventually came to power, he wreaked his revenge on Shiraz by destroying the city's fortifications and moving the national capital to Tehran. The Lak quarter of Shiraz, established during the Zand period, was destroyed by Agha Mohammad Khan. Although lowered to the rank of a provincial capital, Shiraz maintained a level of prosperity as a result of the continuing importance of the trade route to the Persian Gulf. Its governorship was a royal prerogative throughout the Qajar era. Many of the famous gardens, buildings and residences built during this time contribute to the city's present skyline.

Shiraz is the birthplace of the co-founder of the Baháʼí Faith, the Báb (Siyyid 'Ali-Muhammad, 1819–1850). In this city, on the evening of 22 May 1844, he first declared his mission as the bearer of a new divine revelation. For this reason, Shiraz is a holy city for Baháʼís, and the city, particularly the house of the Báb, was identified as a place of pilgrimage. Due to the hostile climate towards Baháʼís in Iran, the house has been the target of repeated attacks; the house was destroyed in 1979, to be paved over two years later and made into a public square.

In 1910, a pogrom in the Jewish quarter started after false rumours that the Jews had ritually murdered a Muslim girl. In the course of the riots, 12 Jews were murdered and about 50 were injured, and the 6,000 Jews of Shiraz were robbed of all their possessions.

During the Pahlavi era, Shiraz became the center of attention again. Important landmarks like the tombs of poets such as Sa'di and Hafez, were constructed and presented to the public.

Lacking any great industrial, religious or strategic importance, Shiraz became an administrative center, although its population has nevertheless grown considerably since the 1979 Iranian Revolution.

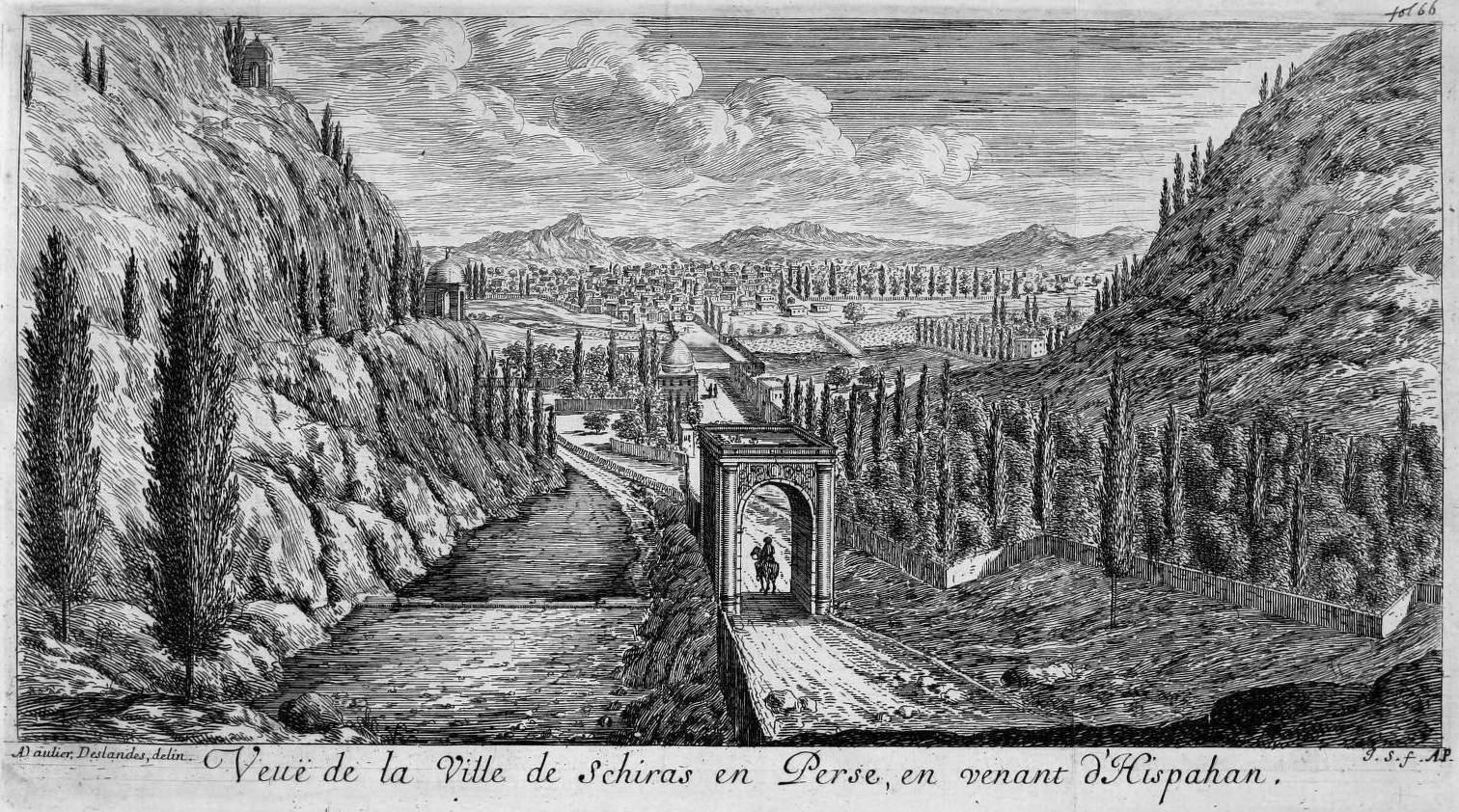
Shiraz, André D. Deslandes, 1671

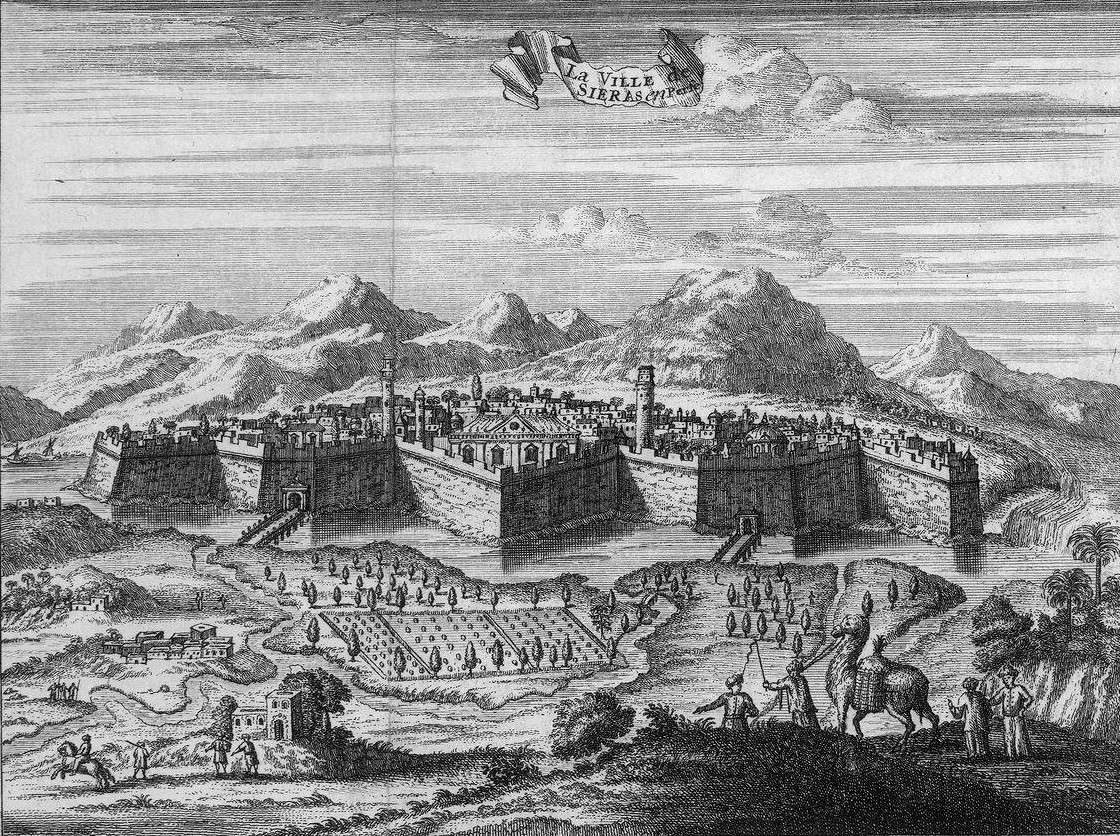
Shiraz, Jean Struys, 1681

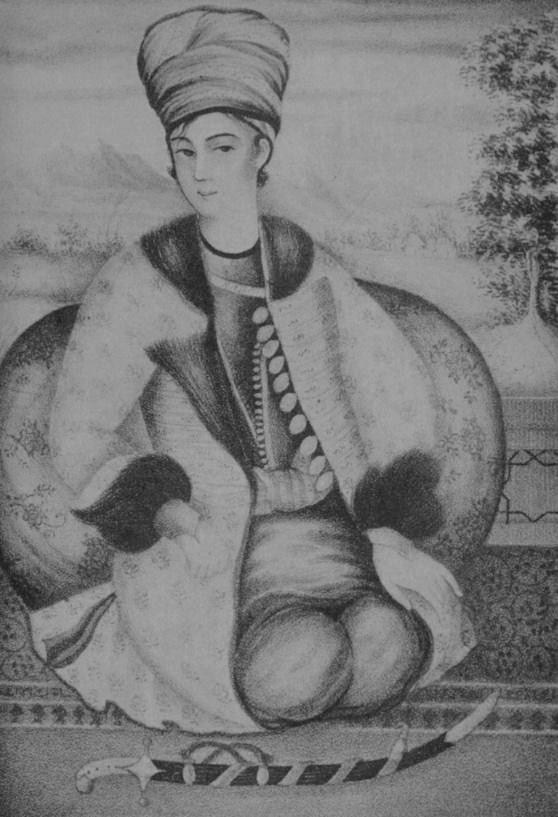
Lotf Ali Khan (r. 1789–1794), ruler of the Zand dynasty

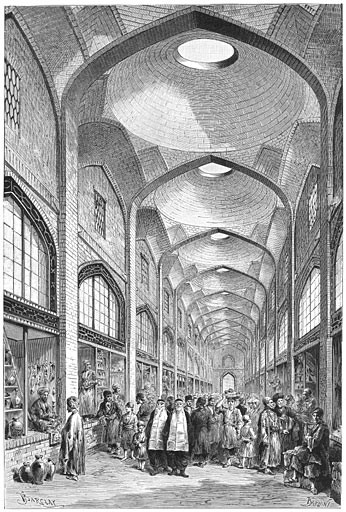
Illustration of the Vakil Bazaar by Jane Dieulafoy, 1881

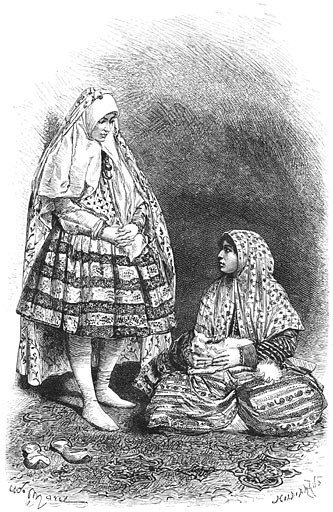
Women from Shiraz, by Dieulafoy in 1881

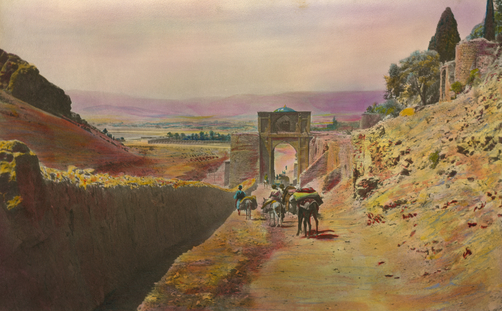
Qur'an Gate, by Harold F. Weston, 1921

=== Modern times ===
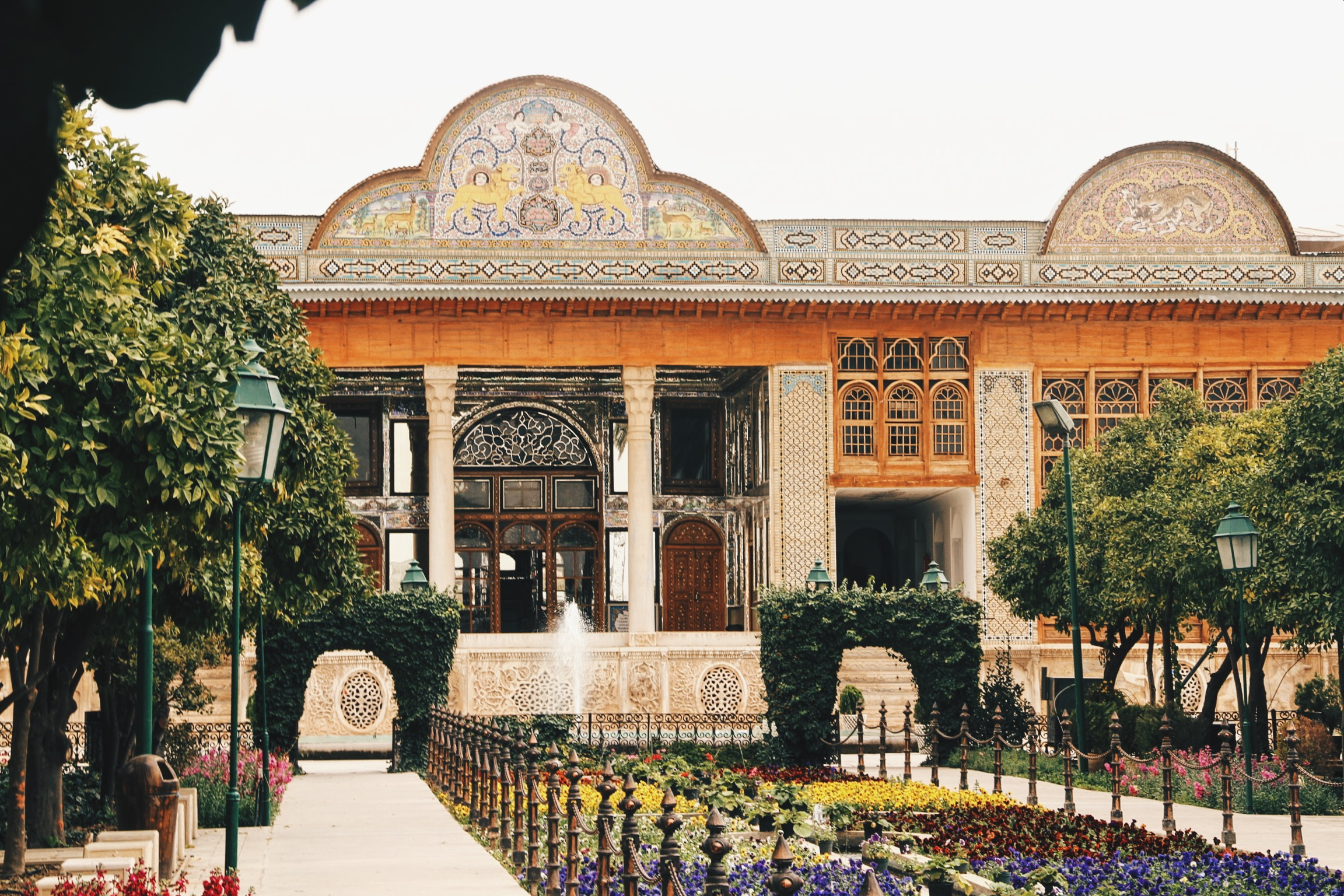
Narenjestan Qavam

The city's municipality and other related institutions have initiated restoration and reconstruction projects.

Some of the most recent projects have been the complete restoration of the Arg of Karim Khan and of the Vakil Bath, as well as a comprehensive plan for the preservation of the old city quarters. Other noteworthy initiatives include the total renovation of the Qur'an Gate and the mausoleum of the poet Khwaju Kermani, both located in the Allah-u-Akbar Gorge, as well as the restoration and expansion of the mausoleum of the famous Shiraz-born poets Hafiz and Saadi.

Several different construction projects are currently underway that will modernize and develop the city's infrastructure.

== Demographics ==
=== Ethnicity ===
The majority of the population are Persians. Most of the population of Shiraz are Shia Muslim. Shiraz also was home to a 20,000-strong Jewish community, although most emigrated to the United States and Israel in the latter half of the 20th century. Along with Tehran and Isfahan, Shiraz is one of the handful of Iranian cities with a sizable Jewish population and more than one active synagogue. Shiraz also has a significant Baháʼí Faith population, the largest in the country after Tehran. There are currently two functioning churches in Shiraz, one Armenian and the other Anglican.

=== Population ===
Historical population
Year	Pop.	±% p.a.
1986	848,289	—
1991	965,117	+2.61%
1996	1,053,025	+1.76%
2006	1,227,331	+1.54%
2011	1,460,665	+3.54%
2016	1,565,572	+1.40%

At the time of the 2006 National Census, the city's population was 1,204,882 in 265,637 households. The following census in 2011 counted 1,460,665 people in 416,141 households. The 2016 census measured the population of the city as 1,565,572 people in 477,916 households.

== Geography ==
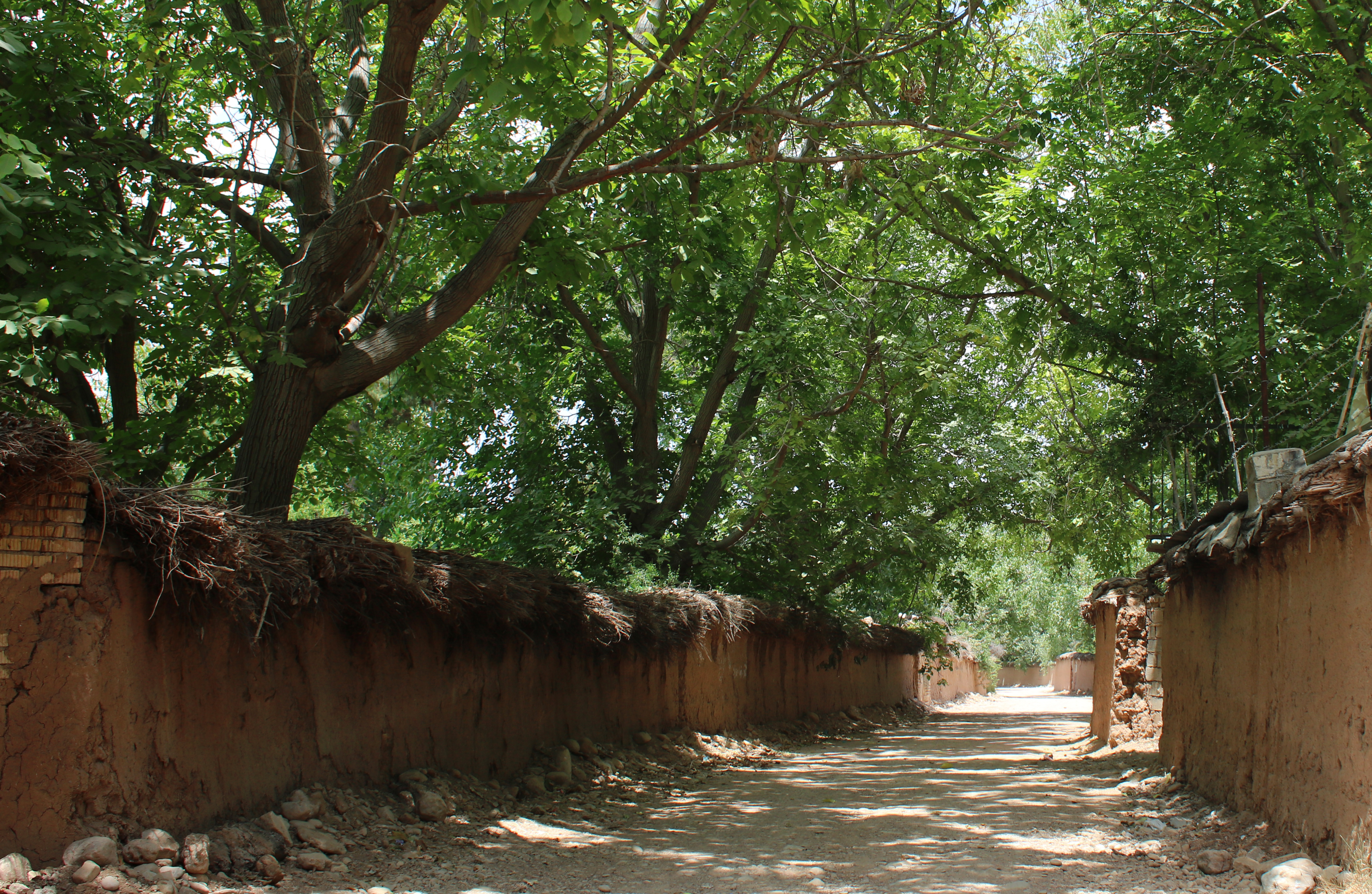
Shiraz Garden Drives, in the north, has gardens predating the city's expansion.

The city of Shiraz, the capital of Fars province, is located at 52 degrees 32 minutes east longitude and 29 degrees 36 minutes north latitude, and is 919 kilometers from Tehran. In the first official census of Iran in 1335, the city of Shiraz with a population of 170,659 people was the sixth most populous city in Iran. Shiraz is located in the south of Iran and the northwest of Fars province. It is built in a green plain at the foot of the Zagros Mountains 1,500 metres (4,900 feet) above sea level. Shiraz is 800 kilometres (500 mi) south of Tehran.

A seasonal river, Dry River, flows through the northern part of the city and on into Maharloo Lake. As of 1920, the area had a large forest of oak trees.

=== Gardens ===
Shiraz contains a considerable number of gardens. Due to population growth in the city, a number of these gardens may be lost to give way to new developments. Although some measures have been taken by the Municipality to preserve these gardens, a number of illegal developments still endanger them.

=== Climate ===
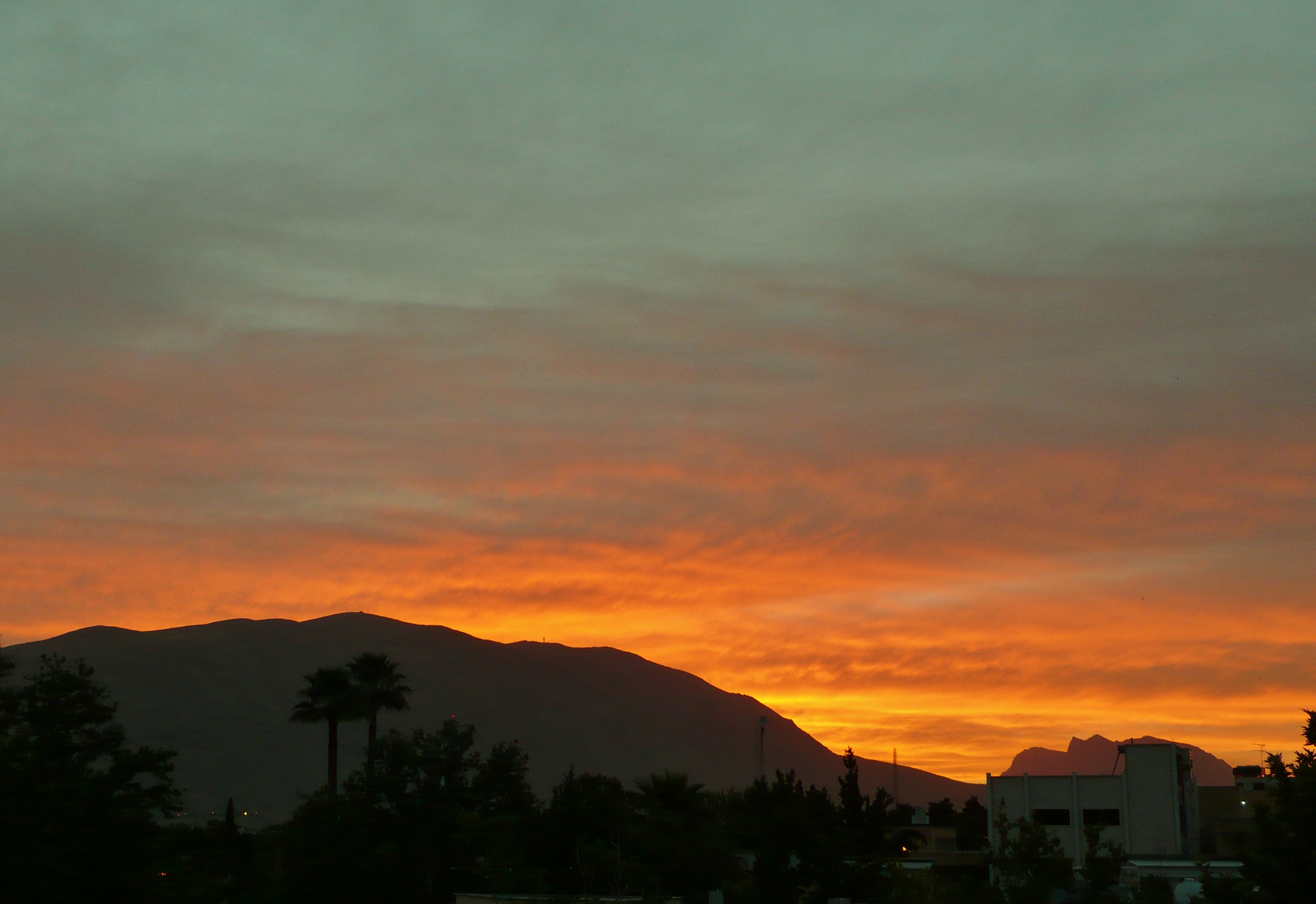
Sunset in Shiraz, with Derock Mountain in the background

Shiraz's climate has distinct seasons, and is overall classed as a semi-arid climate (Köppen climate classification BSh, bordering on BSk). Summers are hot, with a July average high of 38.7 °C (101.7 °F). Winters are cool, with average low temperatures below freezing in January. Around 320 mm (13 in) of rain falls each year, almost entirely in the winter months, though in some cases as much as this has fallen in a single month (as in January 1965 and December 2004), whilst in the year from July 1965 to June 1966 as little as 82.9 millimetres (3.3 in) fell. The wettest year has been 1955/1956 with as much as 857.2 millimetres (33.75 in), though since 1959 the highest has been around 590 millimetres (23.2 in) in each of 1995/1996 and 2004/2005. Due to Shiraz' high elevation and low latitude, the UV index is extremely high during summer which is further exacerbated by the high frequency of sunshine.

Despite being in a relatively dry climate, extreme weather is not a rare occasion. On 25 March 2019, flash floods from heavy rains has resulted in 19 deaths and over 200 injuries.

The highest record temperature was 43.4 °C (110.1 °F) on 3 July 2022 and the lowest record temperature was −14.0 °C (6.8 °F) on 5 January 1973.

Climate data for Shiraz, altitude: 1488 m (1991–2020 normals, extremes 1951-present) (Note: Rainy days calculated using parameter codes 46 and 71 from the first source)
Month	Jan	Feb	Mar	Apr	May	Jun	Jul	Aug	Sep	Oct	Nov	Dec	Year
Record high °C (°F)	23.4 (74.1)	25.6 (78.1)	30.8 (87.4)	34.0 (93.2)	39.6 (103.3)	42.8 (109.0)	43.5 (110.3)	42.8 (109.0)	39.2 (102.6)	35.0 (95.0)	28.6 (83.5)	24.2 (75.6)	43.5 (110.3)
Mean daily maximum °C (°F)	12.9 (55.2)	15.6 (60.1)	19.6 (67.3)	25.0 (77.0)	31.3 (88.3)	36.7 (98.1)	38.7 (101.7)	37.7 (99.9)	34.3 (93.7)	28.4 (83.1)	20.3 (68.5)	15.3 (59.5)	26.3 (79.4)
Daily mean °C (°F)	6.1 (43.0)	8.7 (47.7)	12.4 (54.3)	17.5 (63.5)	23.6 (74.5)	28.6 (83.5)	30.8 (87.4)	29.5 (85.1)	25.5 (77.9)	19.6 (67.3)	12.3 (54.1)	7.8 (46.0)	18.5 (65.4)
Mean daily minimum °C (°F)	−0.2 (31.6)	1.9 (35.4)	4.9 (40.8)	9.3 (48.7)	14.0 (57.2)	17.8 (64.0)	20.6 (69.1)	19.4 (66.9)	15.1 (59.2)	10.0 (50.0)	4.6 (40.3)	1.1 (34.0)	9.9 (49.8)
Record low °C (°F)	−14.0 (6.8)	−8.1 (17.4)	−4.3 (24.3)	−2.0 (28.4)	3.0 (37.4)	8.1 (46.6)	14.0 (57.2)	12.0 (53.6)	1.0 (33.8)	1.6 (34.9)	−8.0 (17.6)	−11.0 (12.2)	−14.0 (6.8)
Average precipitation mm (inches)	79.0 (3.11)	53.6 (2.11)	52.0 (2.05)	26.0 (1.02)	5.8 (0.23)	0.2 (0.01)	0.4 (0.02)	1.4 (0.06)	0.0 (0.0)	4.0 (0.16)	37.8 (1.49)	64.1 (2.52)	324.3 (12.78)
Average precipitation days (≥ 1.0 mm)	6.3	5.4	5.1	3.3	1.3	0.1	0.2	0.2	0	0.8	3.3	4.7	30.7
Average rainy days	9.5	9.2	9.2	5.9	1.9	0.3	0.5	0.3	0.1	1.3	5.8	7.6	51.6
Average snowy days	1.5	0.6	0.0	0.0	0.0	0.0	0.0	0.0	0.0	0.0	0.0	0.6	2.7
Average relative humidity (%)	59	52	46	41	28	20	21	23	25	32	49	58	38
Average dew point °C (°F)	−2.1 (28.2)	−1.7 (28.9)	−0.2 (31.6)	2.5 (36.5)	2.2 (36.0)	1.7 (35.1)	4.9 (40.8)	4.7 (40.5)	2.4 (36.3)	0.9 (33.6)	0.4 (32.7)	−0.8 (30.6)	1.2 (34.2)
Mean monthly sunshine hours	218	214	248	260	327	353	340	339	310	295	233	226	3,363
Source 1: NOAA NCEI
Source 2: Iran Meteorological Organization (records), (days with snow)

=== Neighborhoods ===
List of neighborhoods in Shiraz:

- Anjireh (Note: The village was annexed in 2020)
- Zargari
- Abivardi
- Farhang Shahr
- Qasrodasht
- Koshan
- Kuye Zahra
- Ma'ali Abad
- Molla Sadra
- Shahcheragh
- Riyasati Avval
- Riyasati Dovvom
- Shahrak-e-Golestan
- Shahrak-e-Sadra
- Tachara
- Zerehi
- Kolbeh Saadi
- Podonak
- Payegah
- Eram
- Bagh-e Nari (Narvan)
- Siahatgar BLVD
- Abiari Ave
- Artesh square (Army Square)
- Bridgestone
- Babakuhi
- Kuye Jamaran(siman)
- Baskul Nader
- Talkhedash
- Kaftarak
- Sare Dozak
- Chamran
- Sange Siah
- Amir Kabir Blvd
- Modares
- Dinakan
- Darvazeh Kazeron
- Darvaze Isfahan
- Bagh Safa
- Atlasi
- Derki
- See also: Saadi Street

== Economy ==
Shiraz is the economic center of southern Iran. The second half of the 19th century witnessed certain economic developments that greatly changed the economy of Shiraz. The opening of the Suez Canal in 1869 allowed the extensive import into southern Iran of inexpensive European factory-made goods, either directly from Europe or via India. Farmers in unprecedented numbers began planting cash crops such as opium poppy, tobacco, and cotton. A number of these export crops passed through Shiraz on their way to the Persian Gulf. Iranian long-distance merchants from Fars developed marketing networks for these commodities, establishing trading houses in Bombay, Calcutta, Port Said, Istanbul and even Hong Kong.

Shiraz's economic base is in its provincial products, which include grapes, citrus fruits, cotton and rice. Industries such as cement production, sugar, fertilizers, textile products, wood products, metalwork and rugs dominate. Shirāz also has a major oil refinery and is also a major center for Iran's electronic industries. 53% of Iran's electronic investment has been centered in Shiraz.

The Shiraz Special Economic Electronic Zone or the SEEZ was established in 2000 with the purpose of boosting manufacturing in electronics and communications.

Persian Gulf Complex

Shiraz is a major shopping destination in Iran and the Middle East, with more than 25 malls and 10 bazaars.

The Persian Gulf Complex, located at the north end of the city, is the largest mall in the world in terms of the number of shops.

The city is served by Refah Chain Stores Co., Iran Hyper Star, Isfahan City Center, Shahrvand Chain Stores Inc., and Ofoq Kourosh chain store.

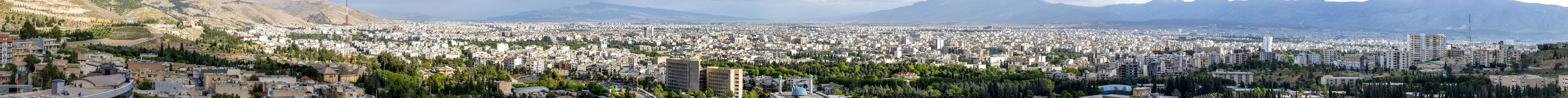
Panoramic view of Shiraz at Daylight

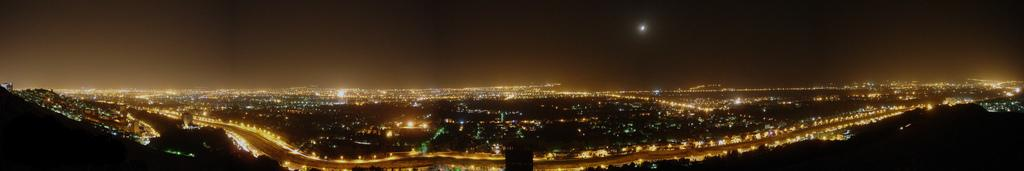
Panoramic view of Shiraz at night

== Culture ==
Shiraz is known as the city of poets, gardens, wine, nightingales and flowers.

The garden is an important part of Iranian culture. There are multiple old gardens in Shiraz such as the Eram garden and the Afif abad garden. According to some people, Shiraz "disputes with Xeres [or Jerez] in Spain the honour of being the birthplace of sherry." Shirazi wine originates from the city; however, under the current Islamic regime, liquor cannot be consumed except by religious minorities.

Shiraz was the birthplace of the poet Hafiz Shirazi. Shiraz is a center for Iranian culture and has produced a number of famous poets. Saadi, a 12th- and 13th-century poet, was born in Shiraz. He left his native town at a young age for Baghdad to study Arabic literature and Islamic sciences at the Nizamiyya of Baghdad. When he reappeared in his native Shiraz, he was an elderly man. Shiraz, under Atabak Abubakr Sa'd ibn Zangy (1231–1260) was enjoying an era of relative tranquility. Saadi was not only welcomed to the city but he was highly respected by the ruler and enumerated among the greats of the province. He seems to have spent the rest of his life in Shiraz. A number of scientists also originate from Shiraz. Qutb al-Din al-Shirazi, a 13th-century astronomer, mathematician, physician, physicist and scientist was from Shiraz. In his The Limit of Accomplishment concerning Knowledge of the Heavens, he also discussed the possibility of heliocentrism.

== Tourism ==
The city holds significant importance as a tourism destination in Iran, with its cultural heritage being globally recognized.

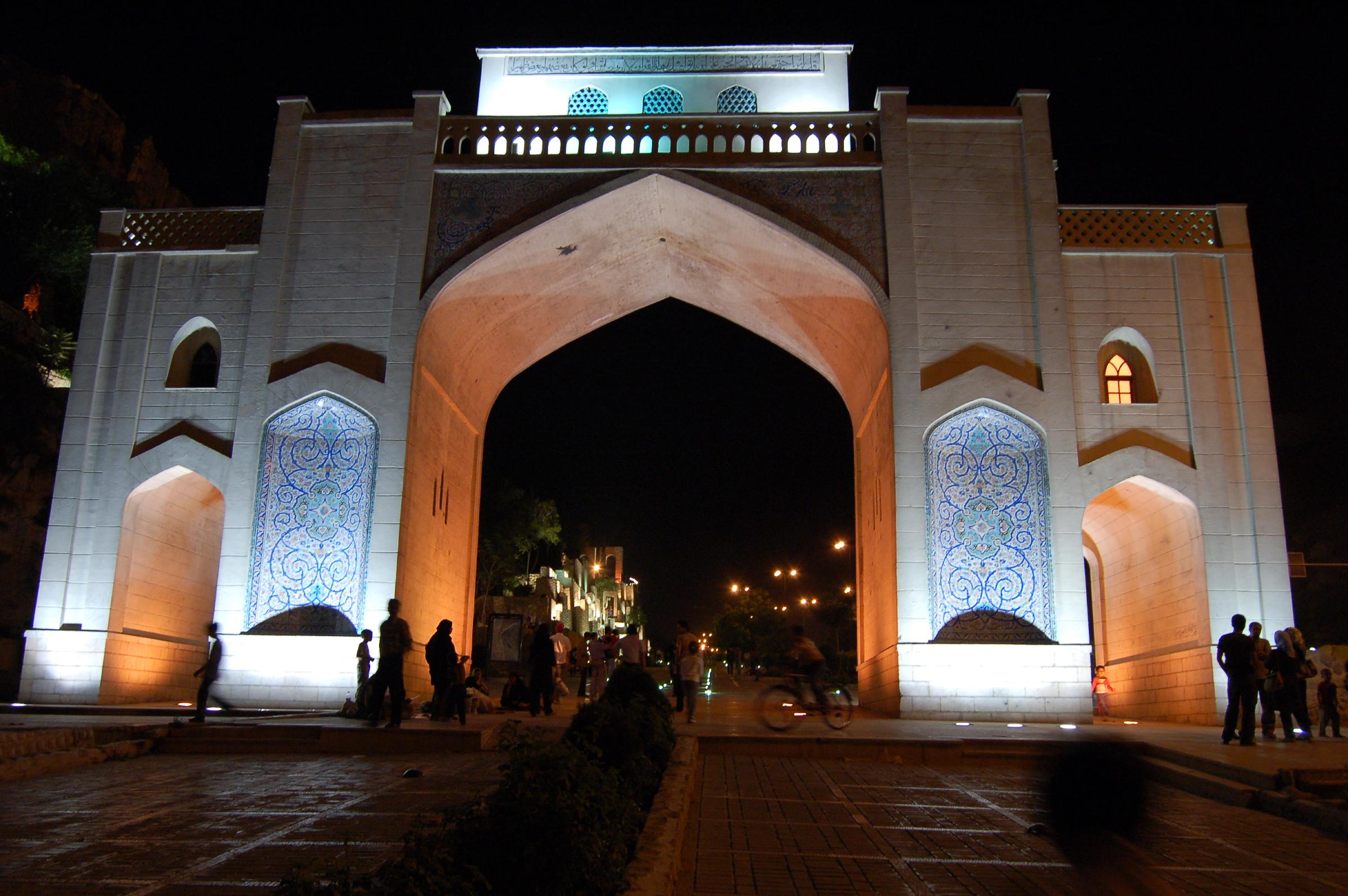
The Qur'an Gate was a part of the great city wall built under the Buyid dynasty

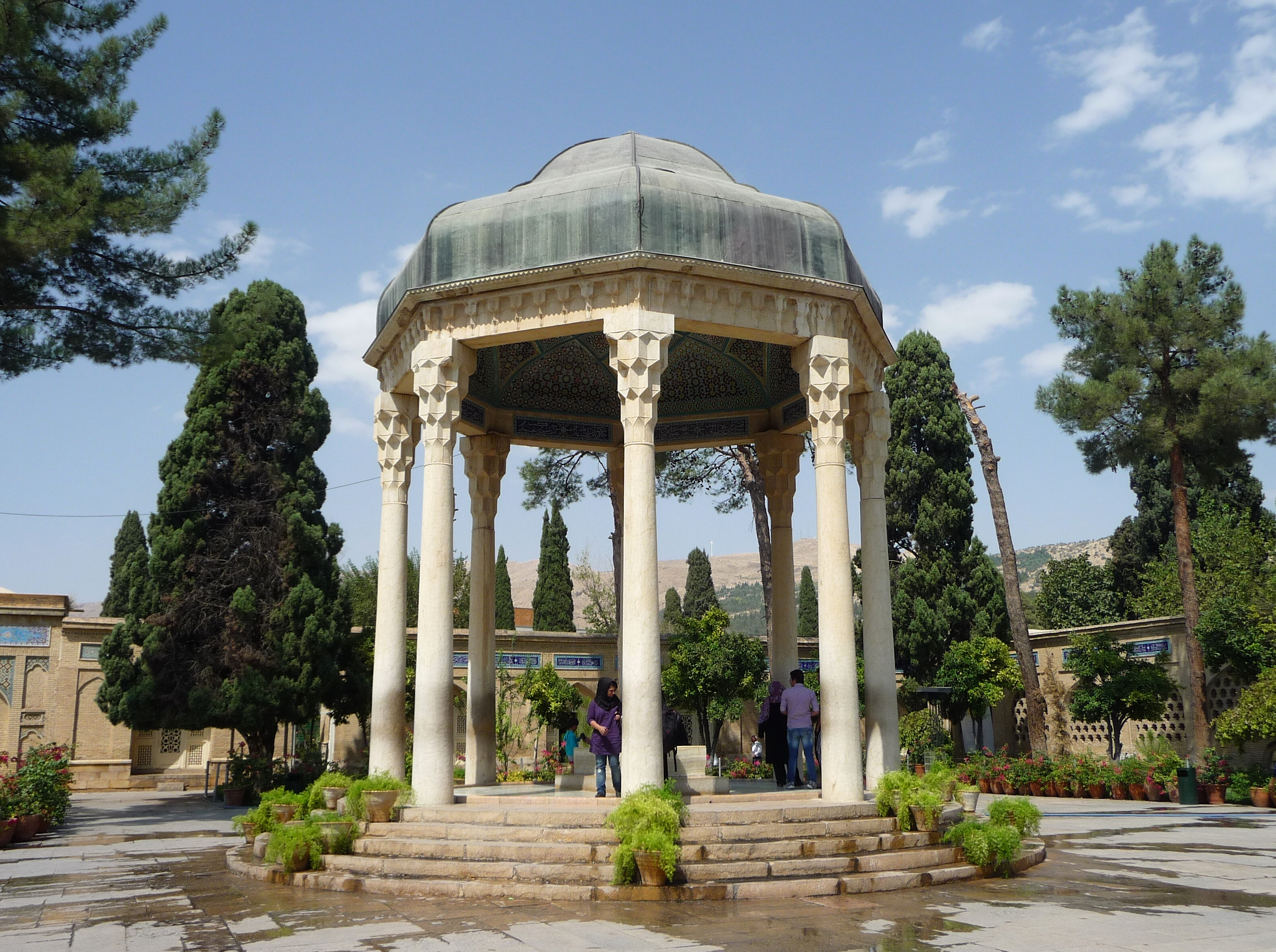
Tomb of Hafez, in memory of the celebrated Persian poet Hafez

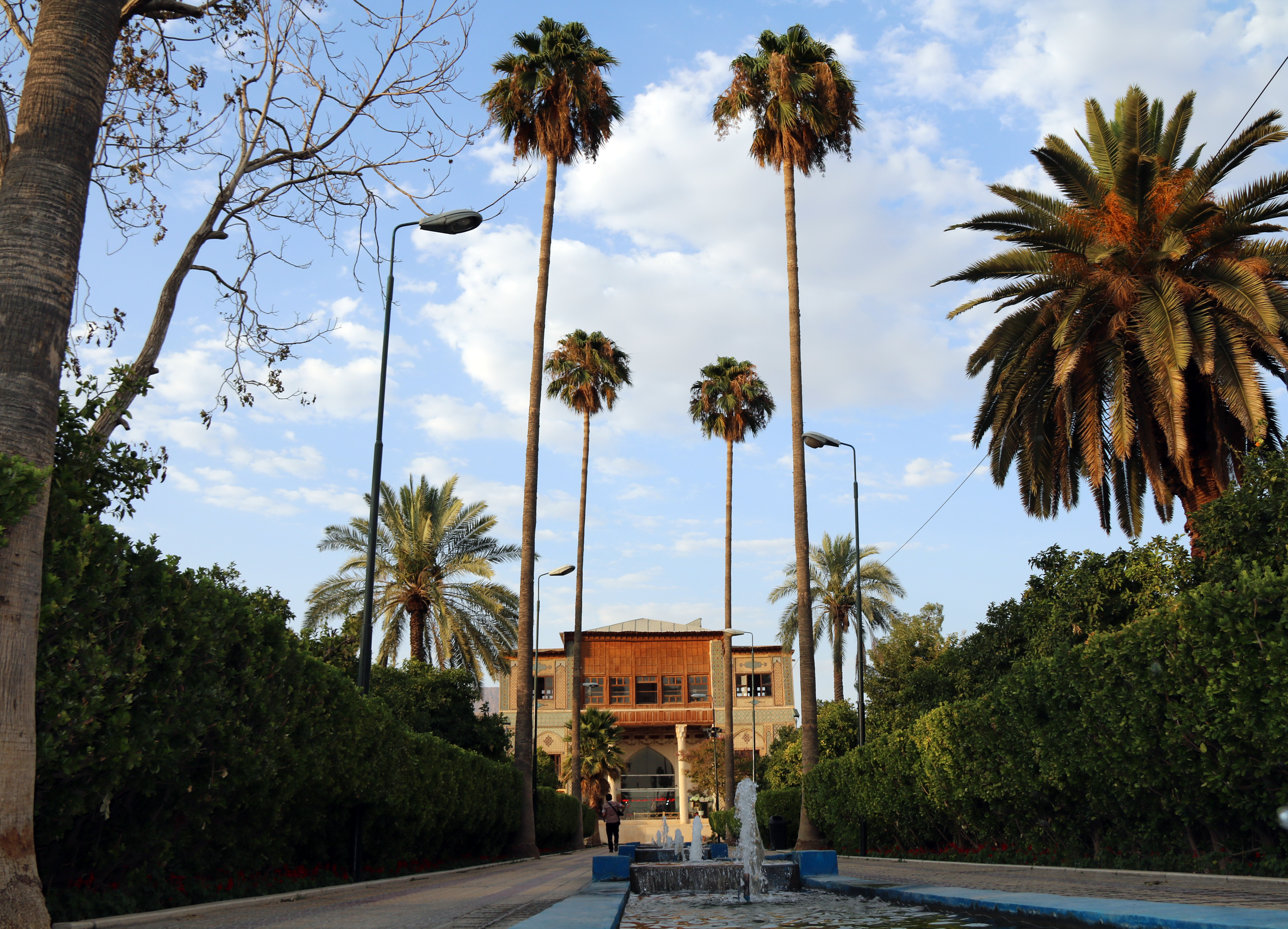
Delgosha Garden

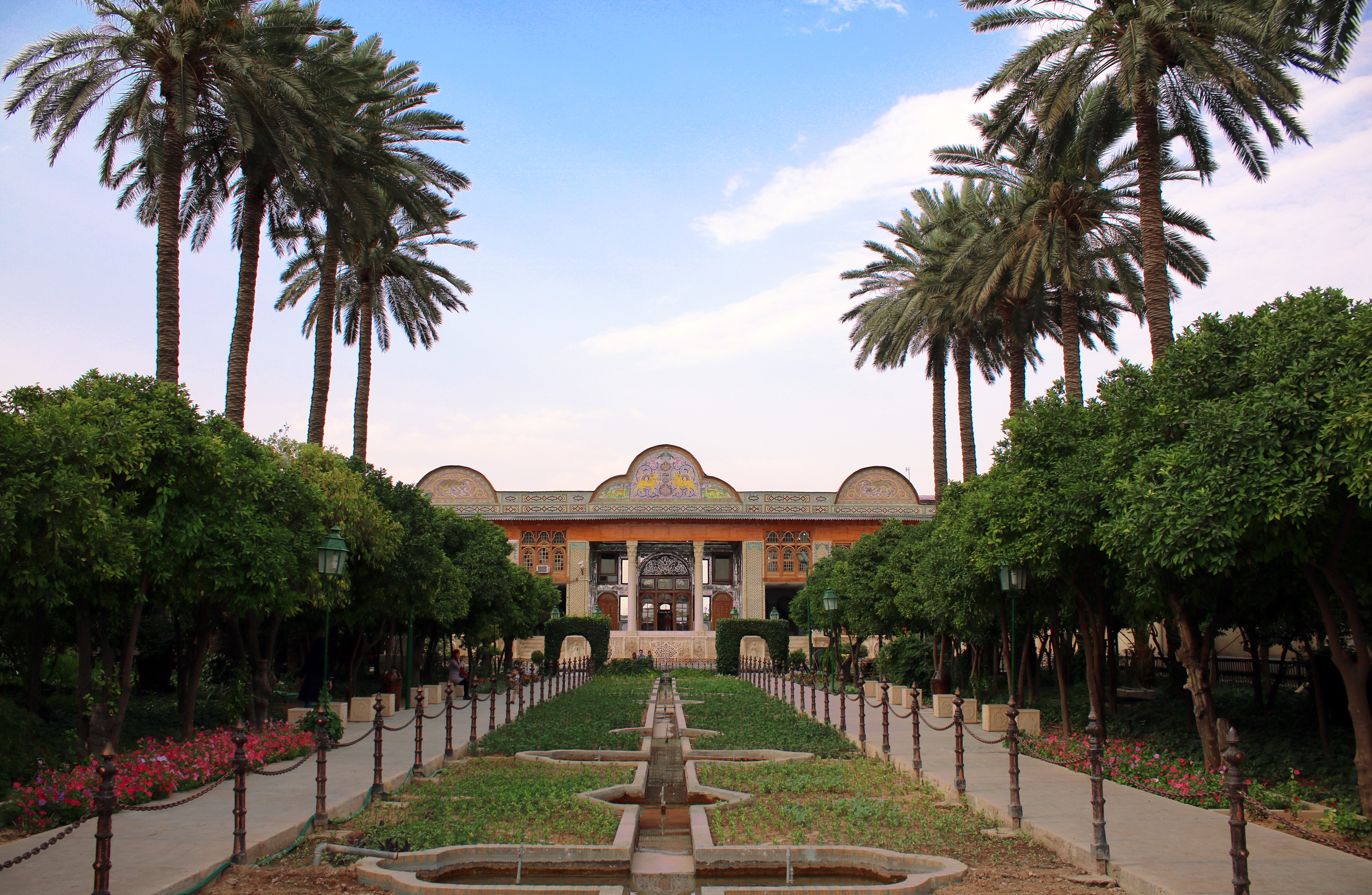
Qavam House

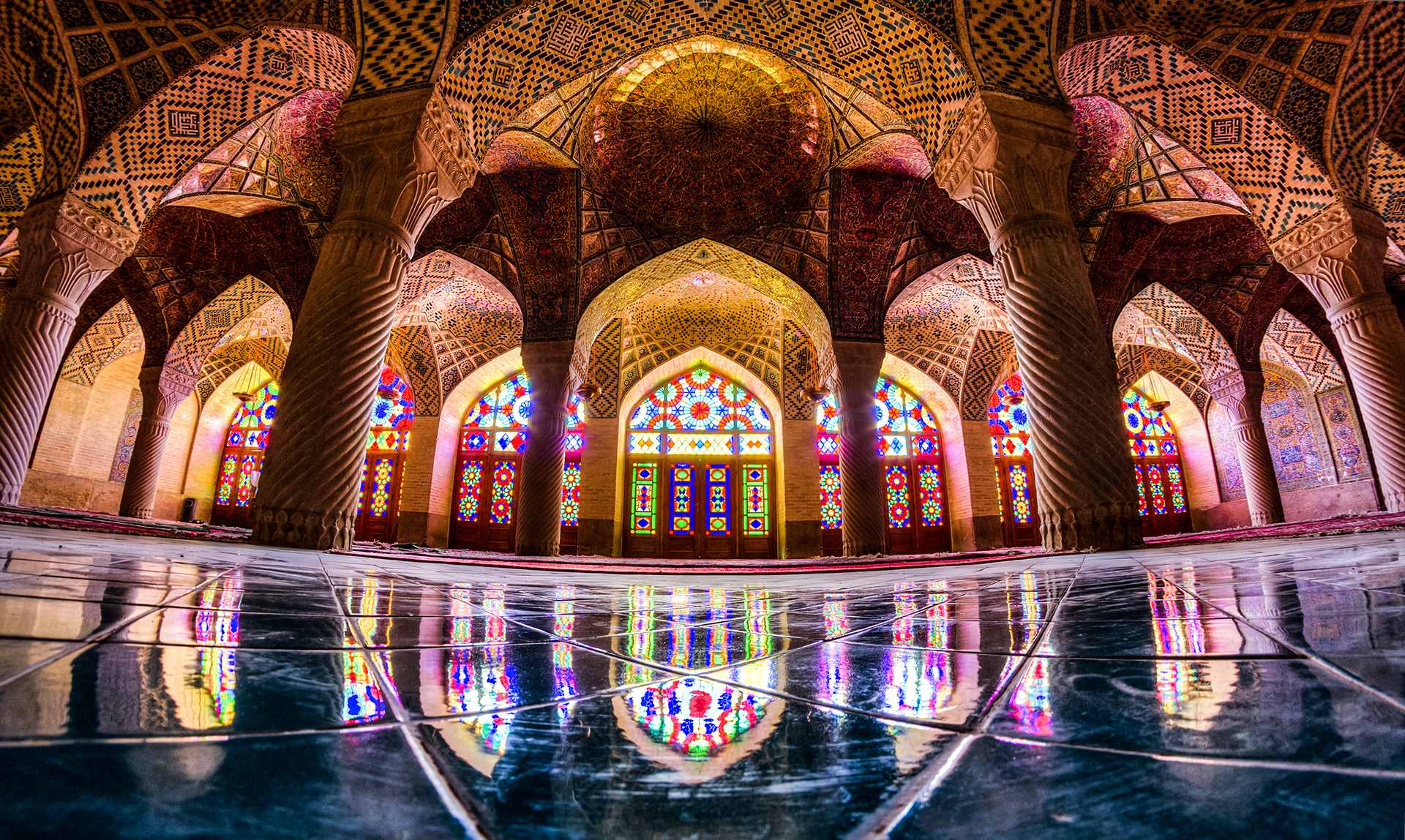
Nasir-ol-Molk Mosque

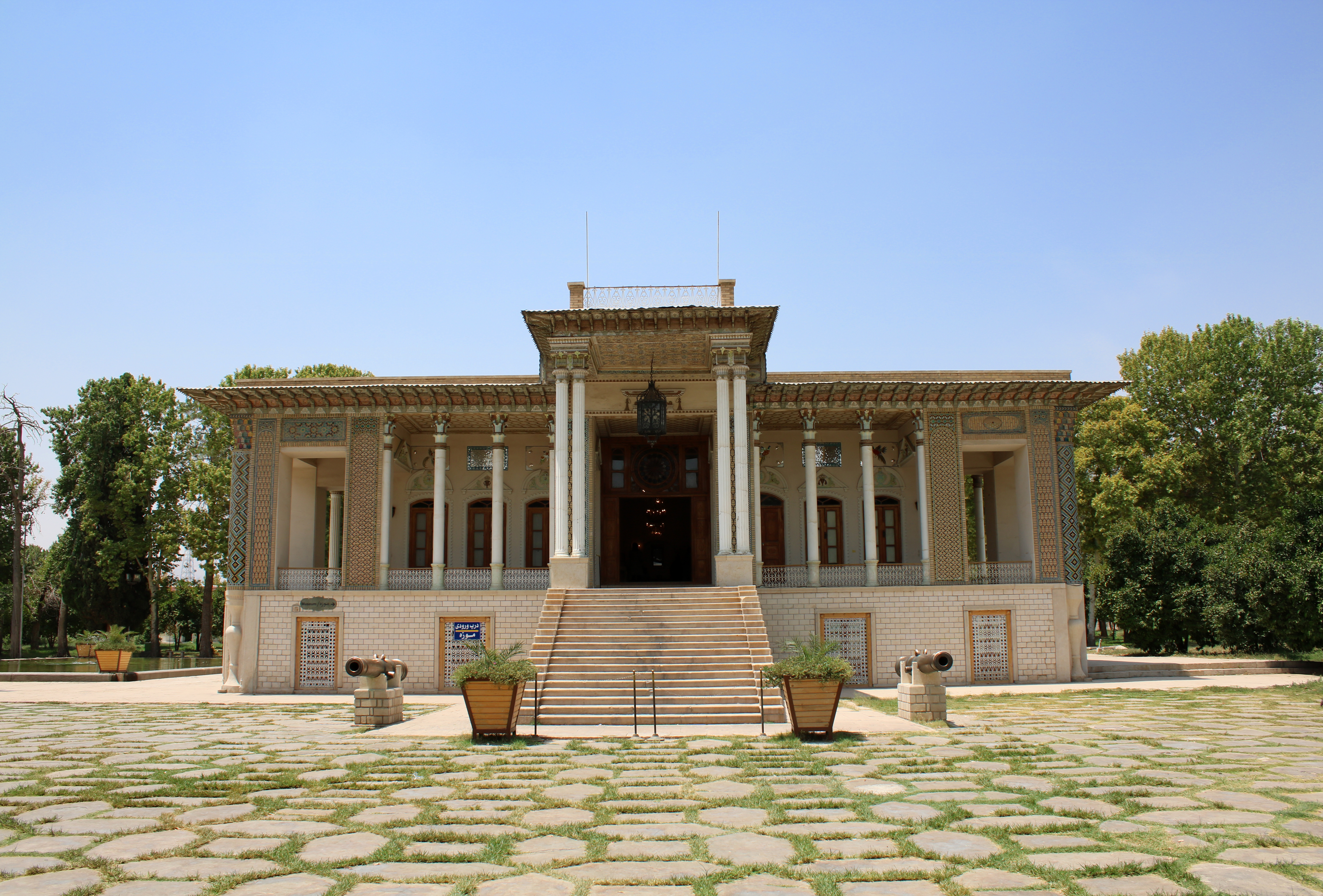
Afif-Abad Garden (Arms Museum)

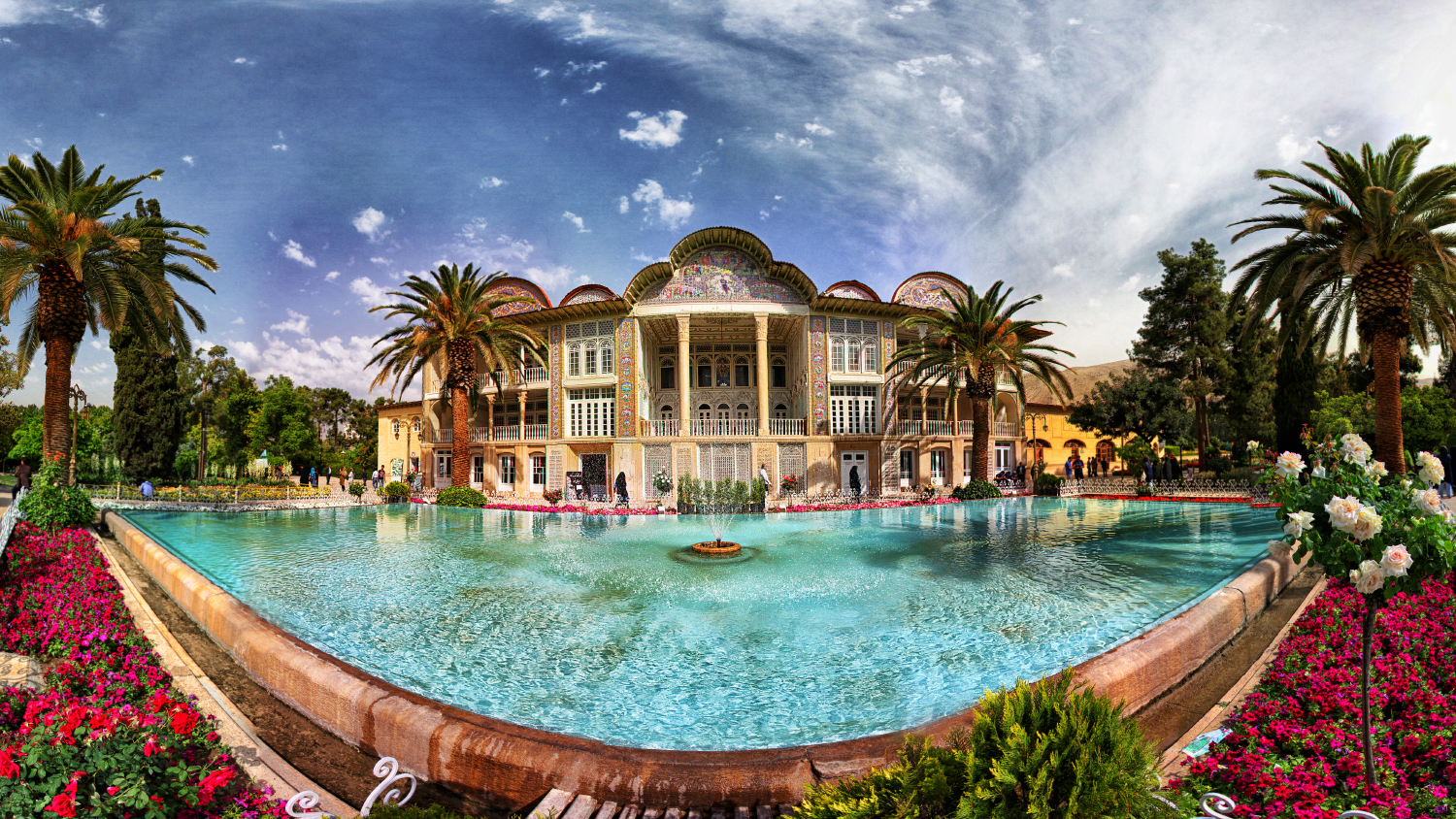
Eram Garden

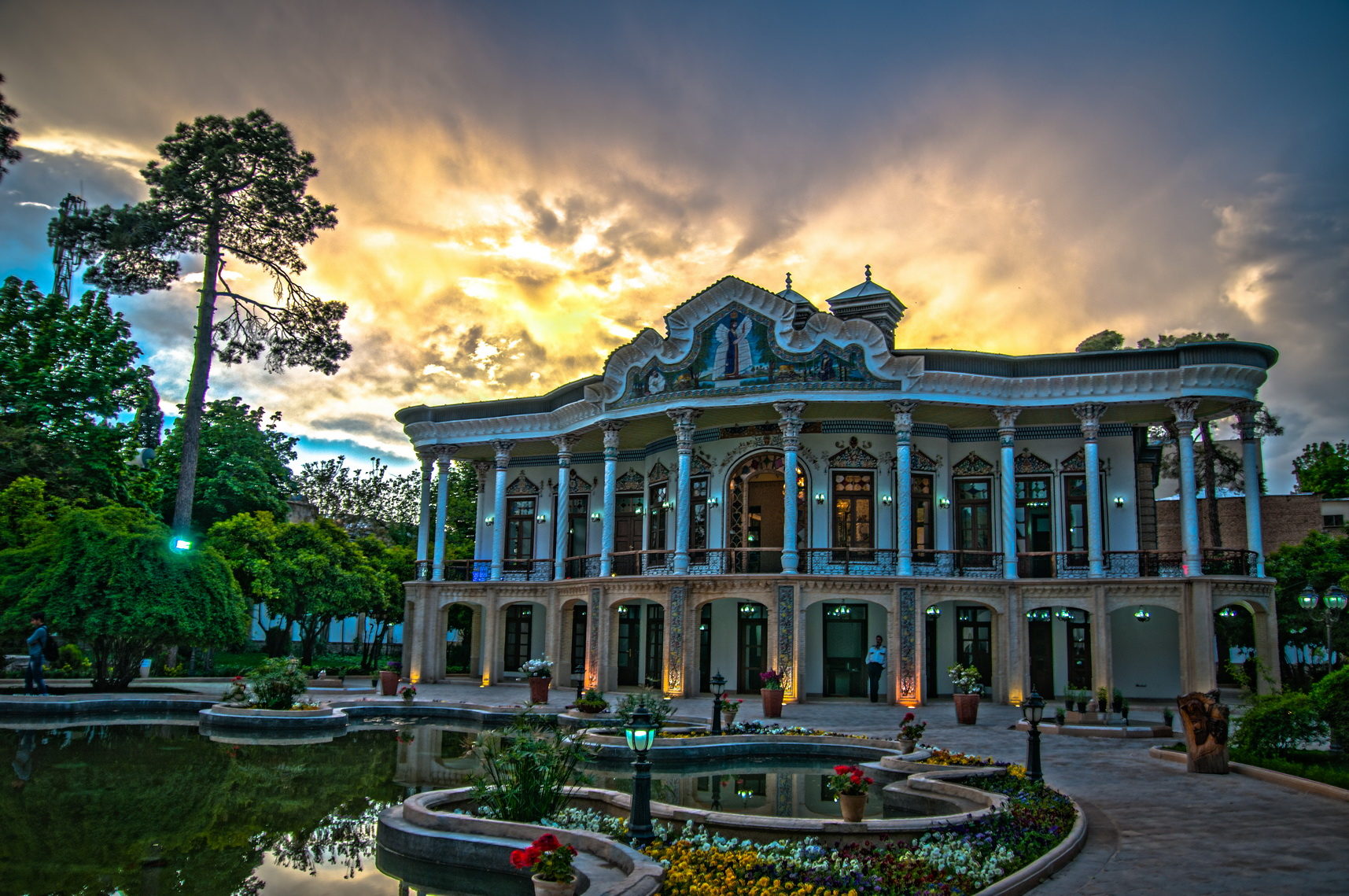
Shapouri House

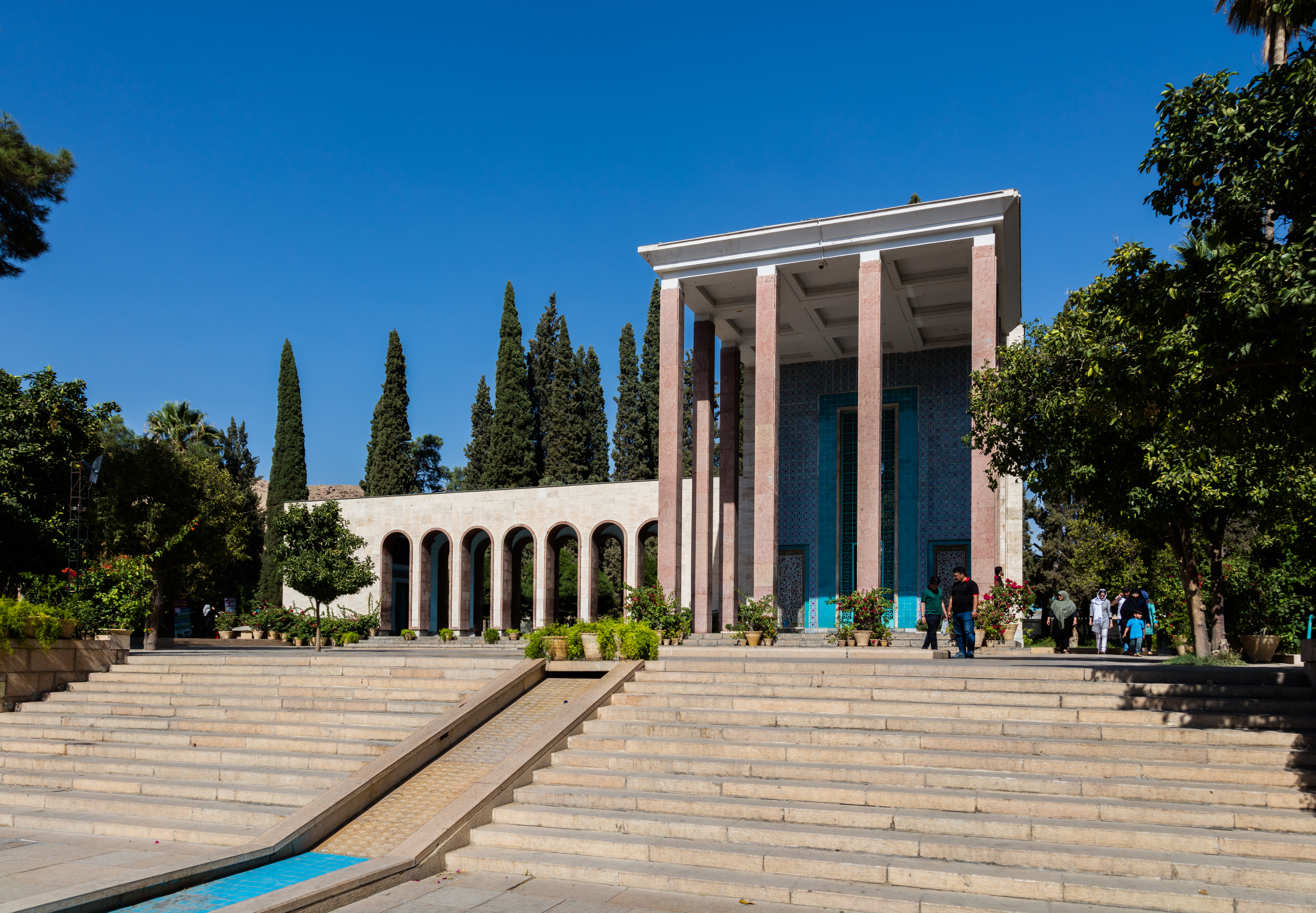
Tomb of Saadi

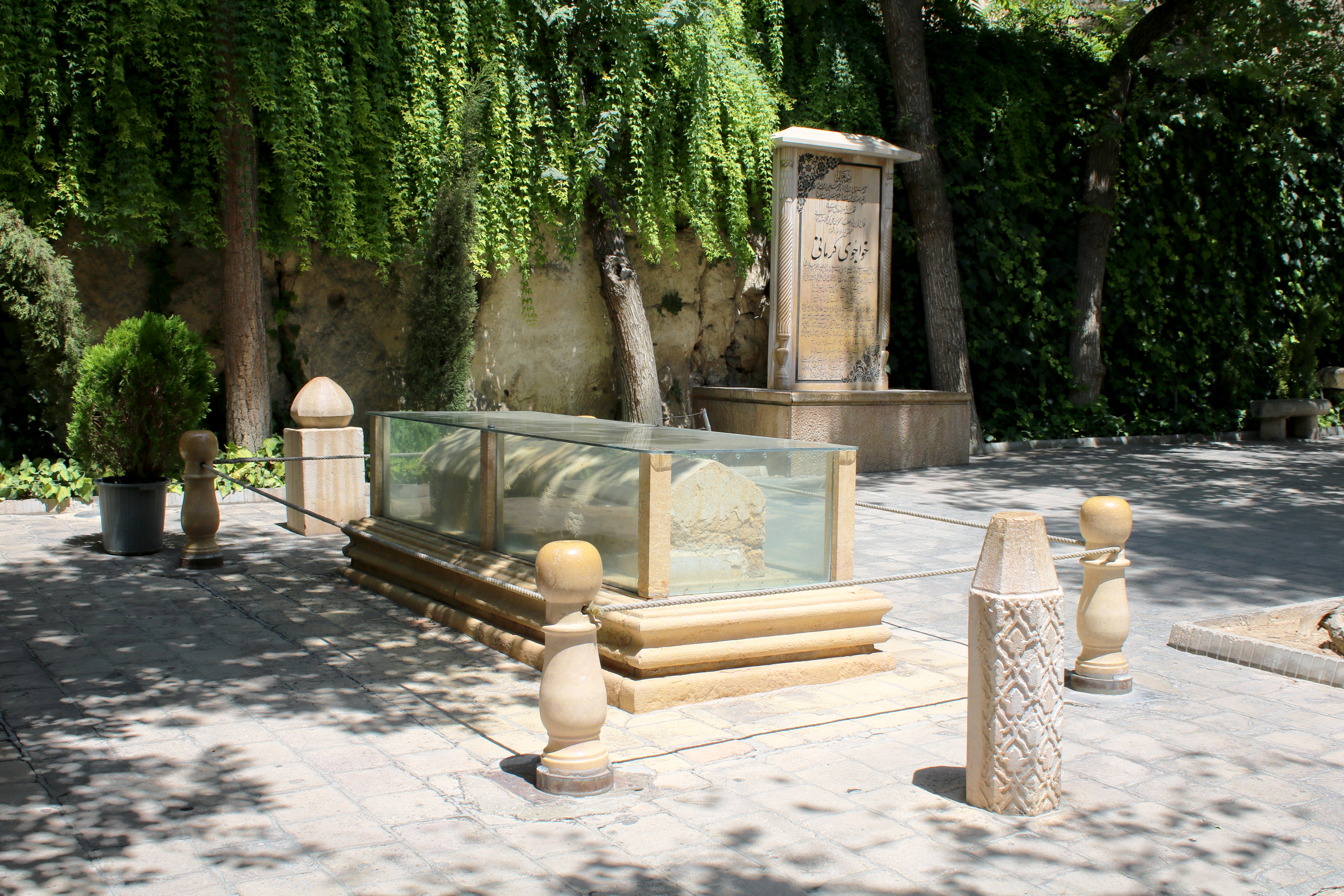
Tomb of Khwaju Kermani
- The tombs of Hafez, Saadi, and Khwaju Kermani (whose tomb is on a mountainside above the city's Qur'an Gate). Other lesser known tombs are that of Shah Shoja' (the Mozafarid emir of Persia, and patron of Hafiz), and the Haft Tanan mausoleum, where seven Sufi mystics are buried. The Tomb of Baba Kuhi sits atop a mountain overlooking the city, and the tomb of Karim Khan Zand is at the Pars Museum.
- The oldest mosque is Atigh Jame' Mosque, followed by Vakil Mosque and Nasir al-Mulk mosque.
- The Arg of Karim Khan (citadel) sits adjacent to the Vakil Bazaar and Vakil Bath at the city's central district.
- The Qur'an Gate is the entrance to Shiraz. It is located near the gorge of Allah-o-Akbar and is flanked by the Baba Kuhi and Chehel Maqam mountains. The gateway once contained two hand-written Qur'āns by Sultan Ibrahim Bin Shahrukh Gurekani in an upper room, which have now been moved to the Pars Museum.
- The Eram Garden (Bagh-e Eram) in Shiraz is a location for visitors with a variety of plants as well as a mansion.
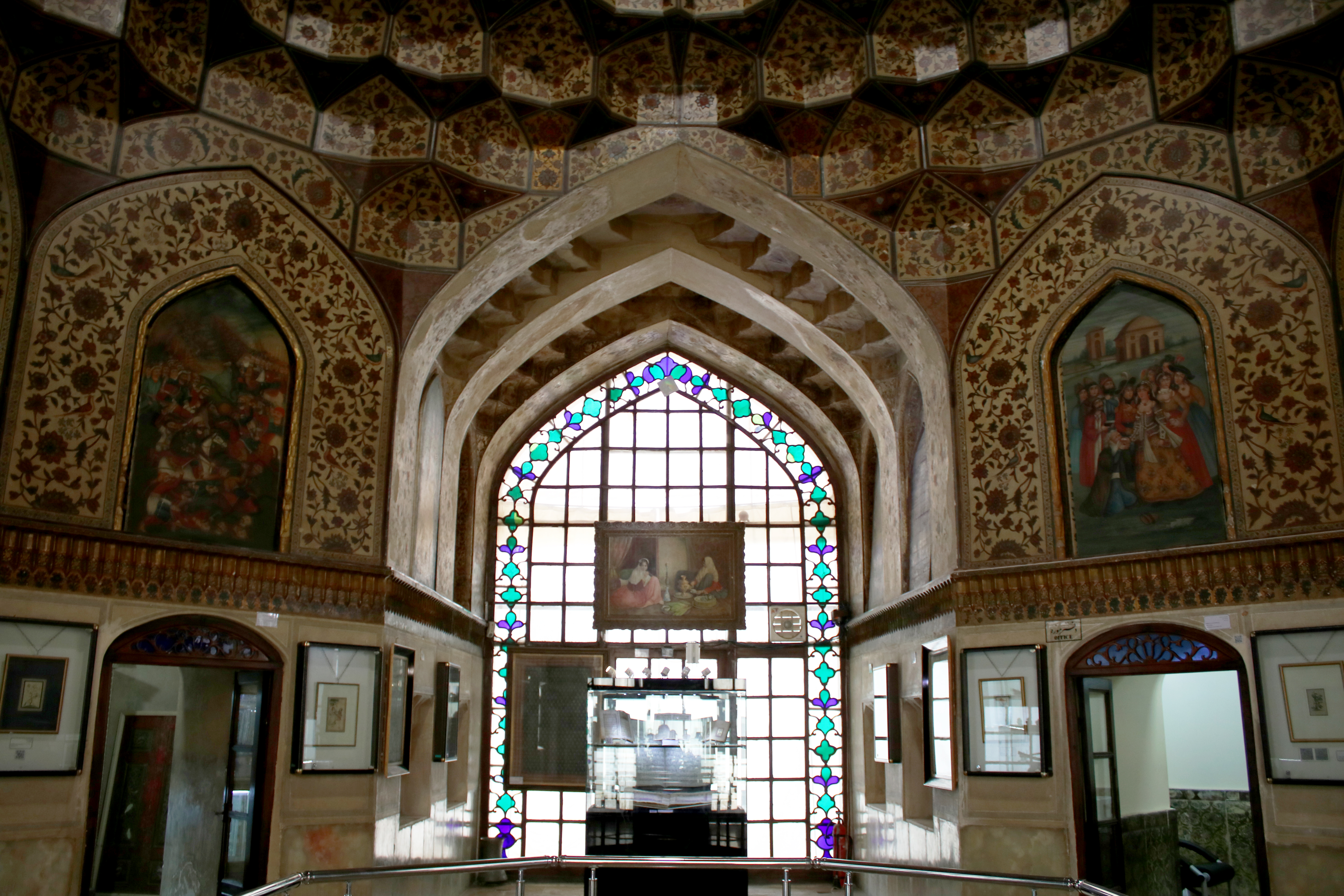
Pars Museum

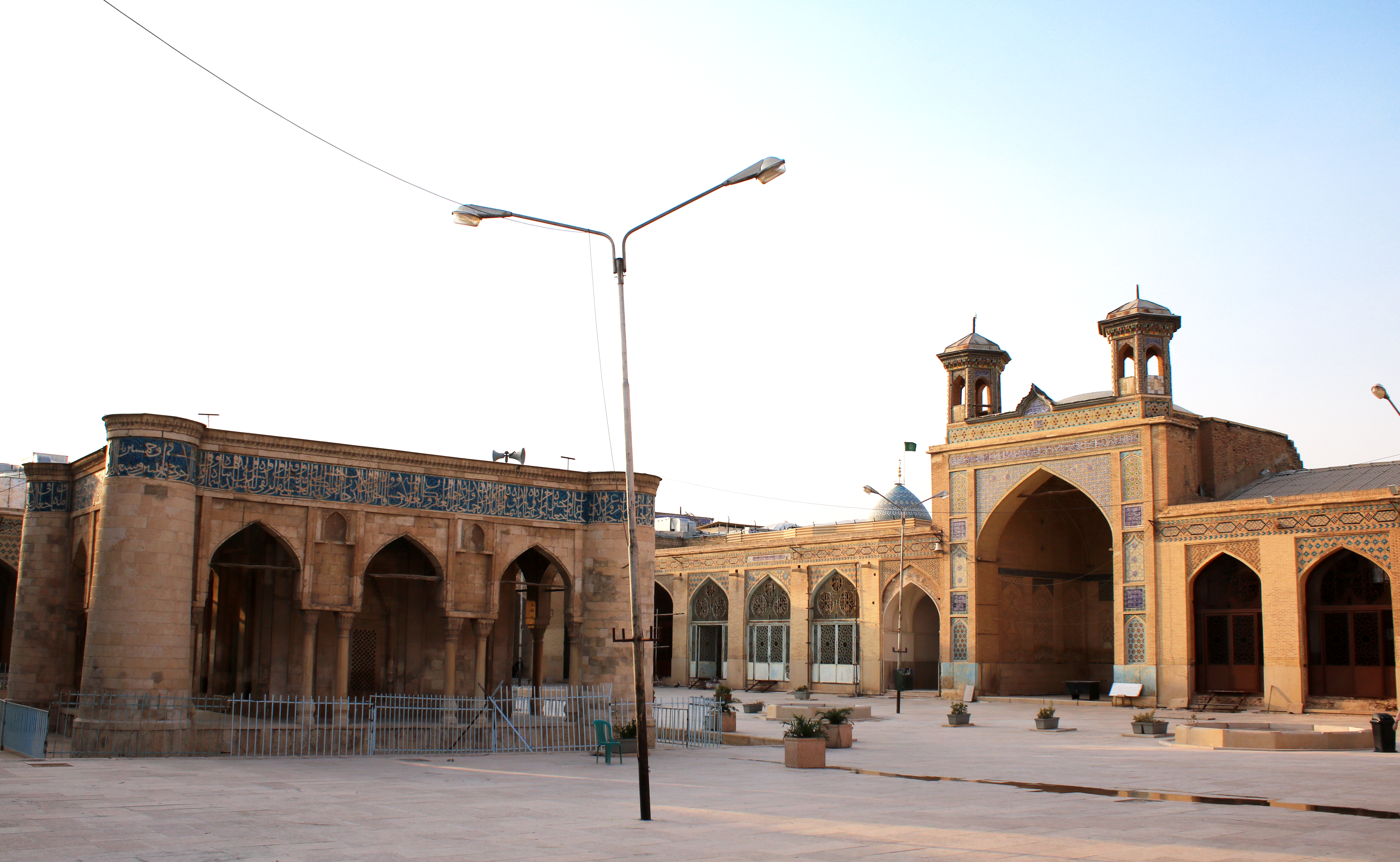
Atigh Mosque

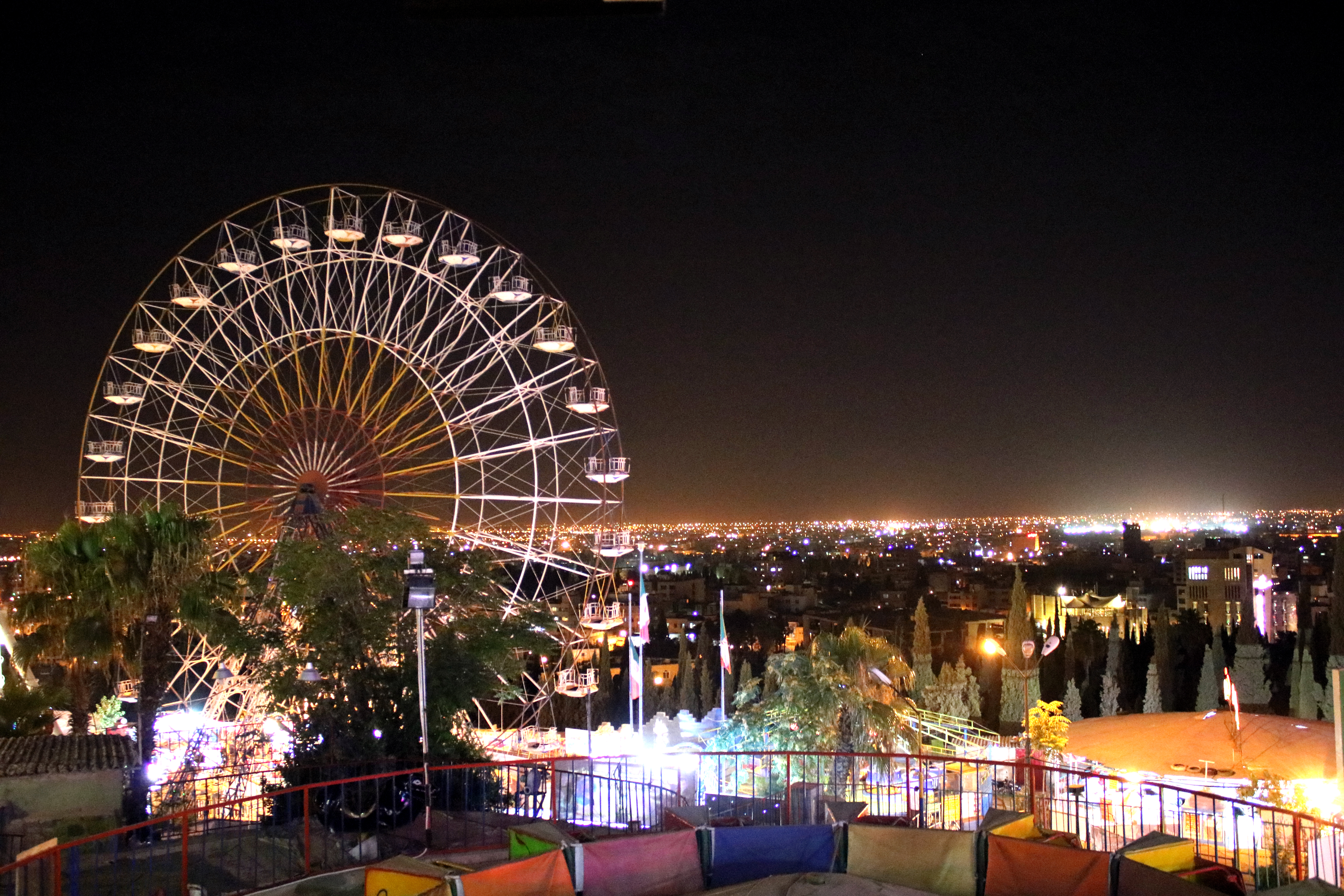
Luna Park

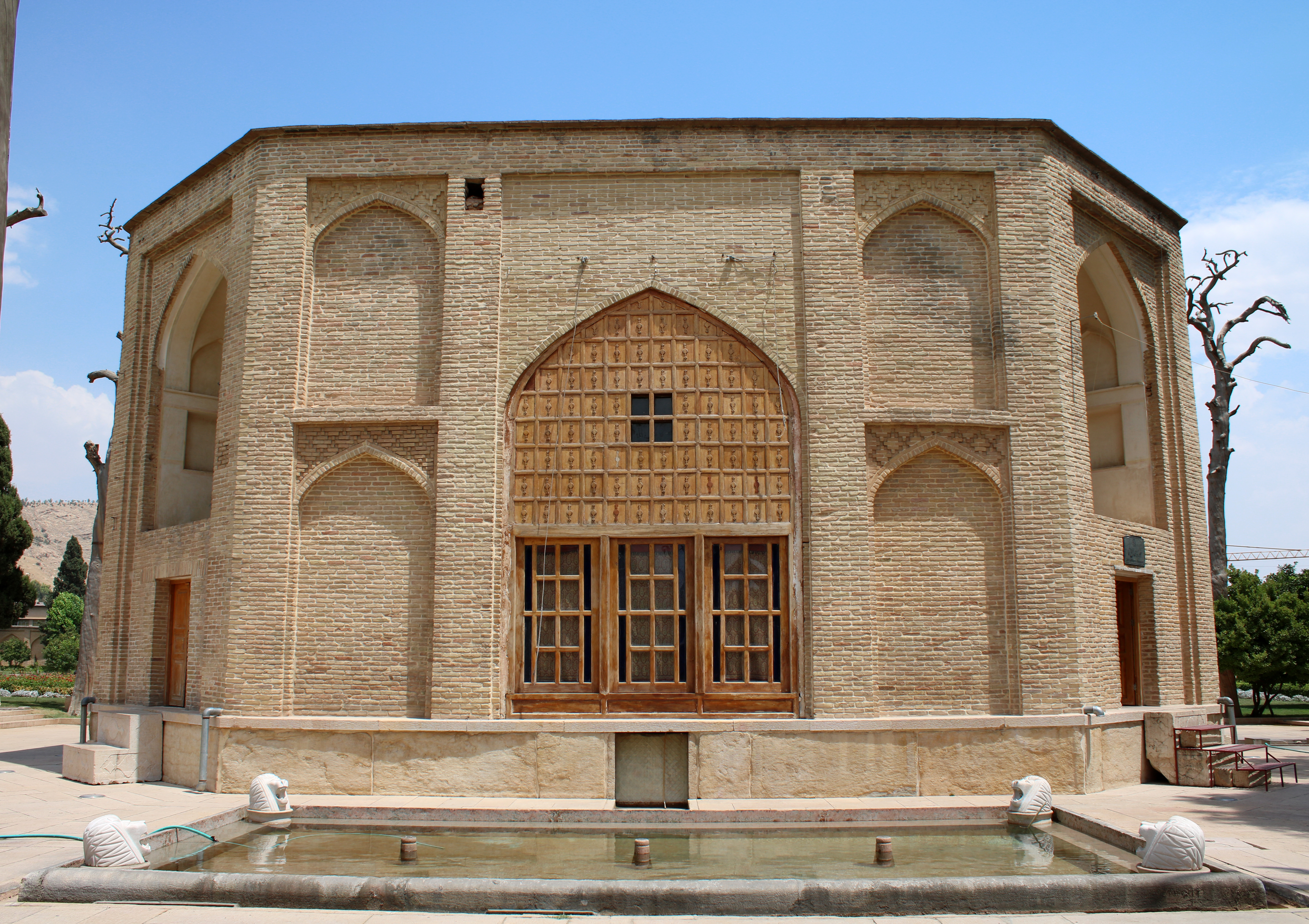
Jahan Nama Garden

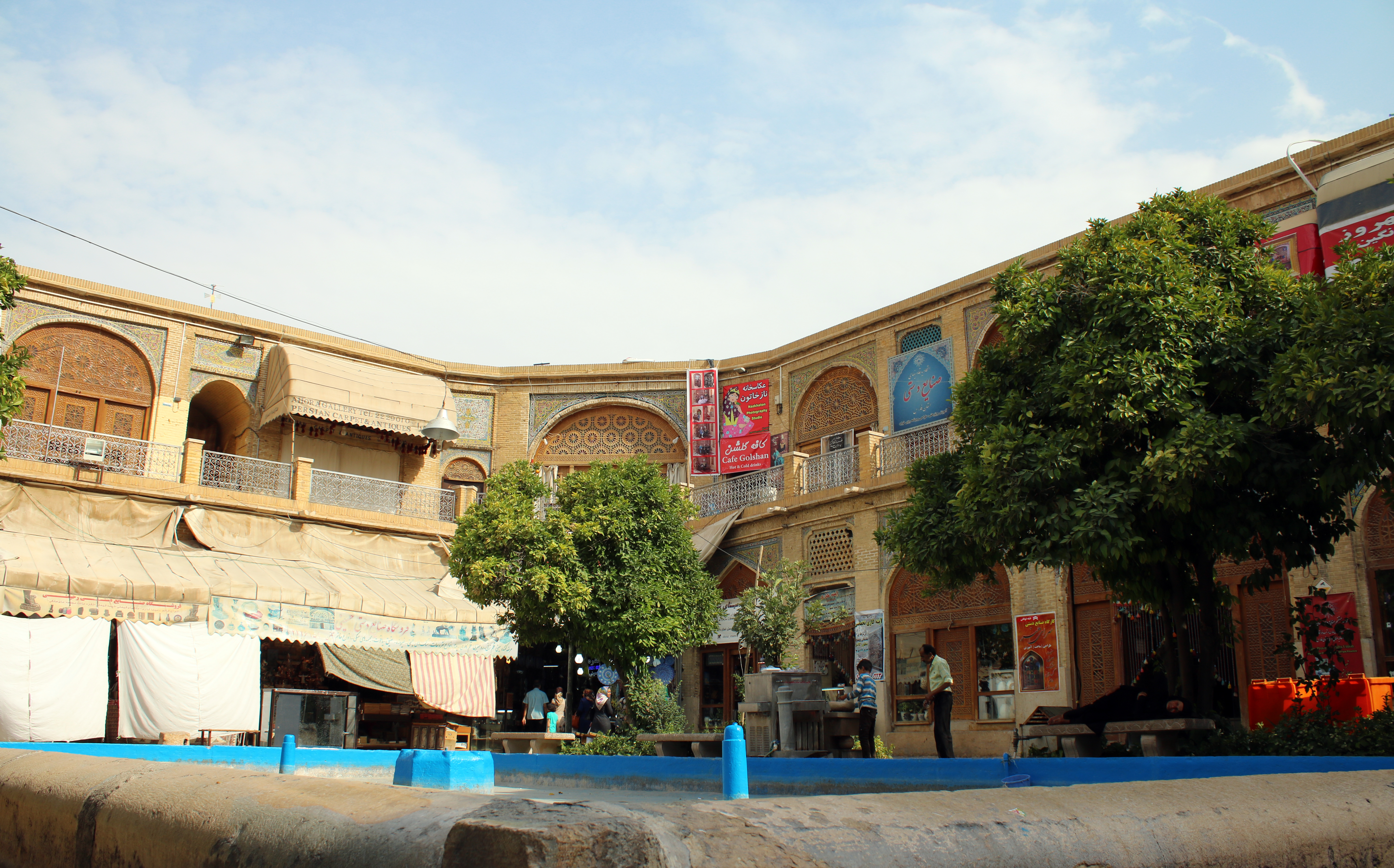
Saraye Moshir

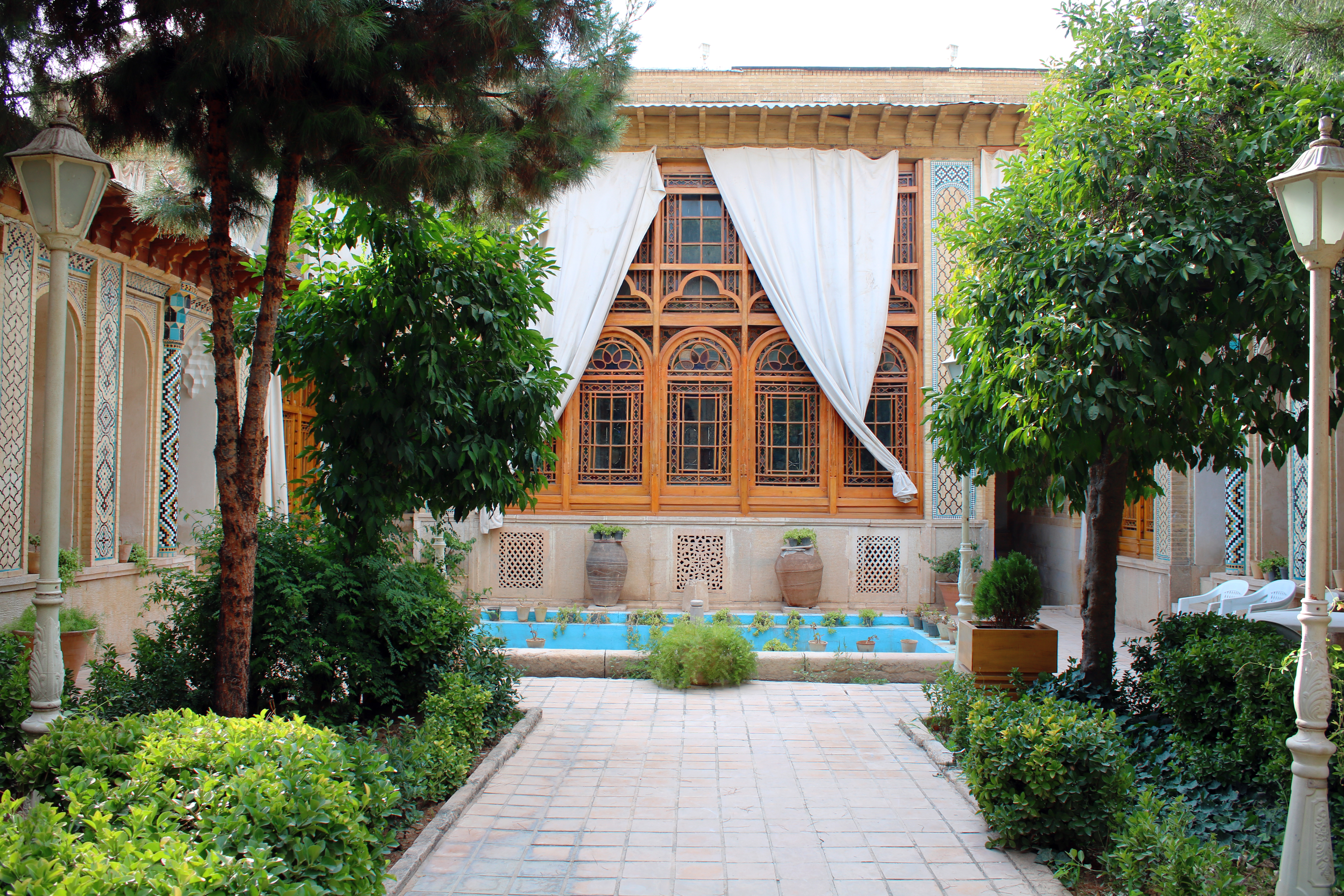
Qavam ol-Molk Mansion

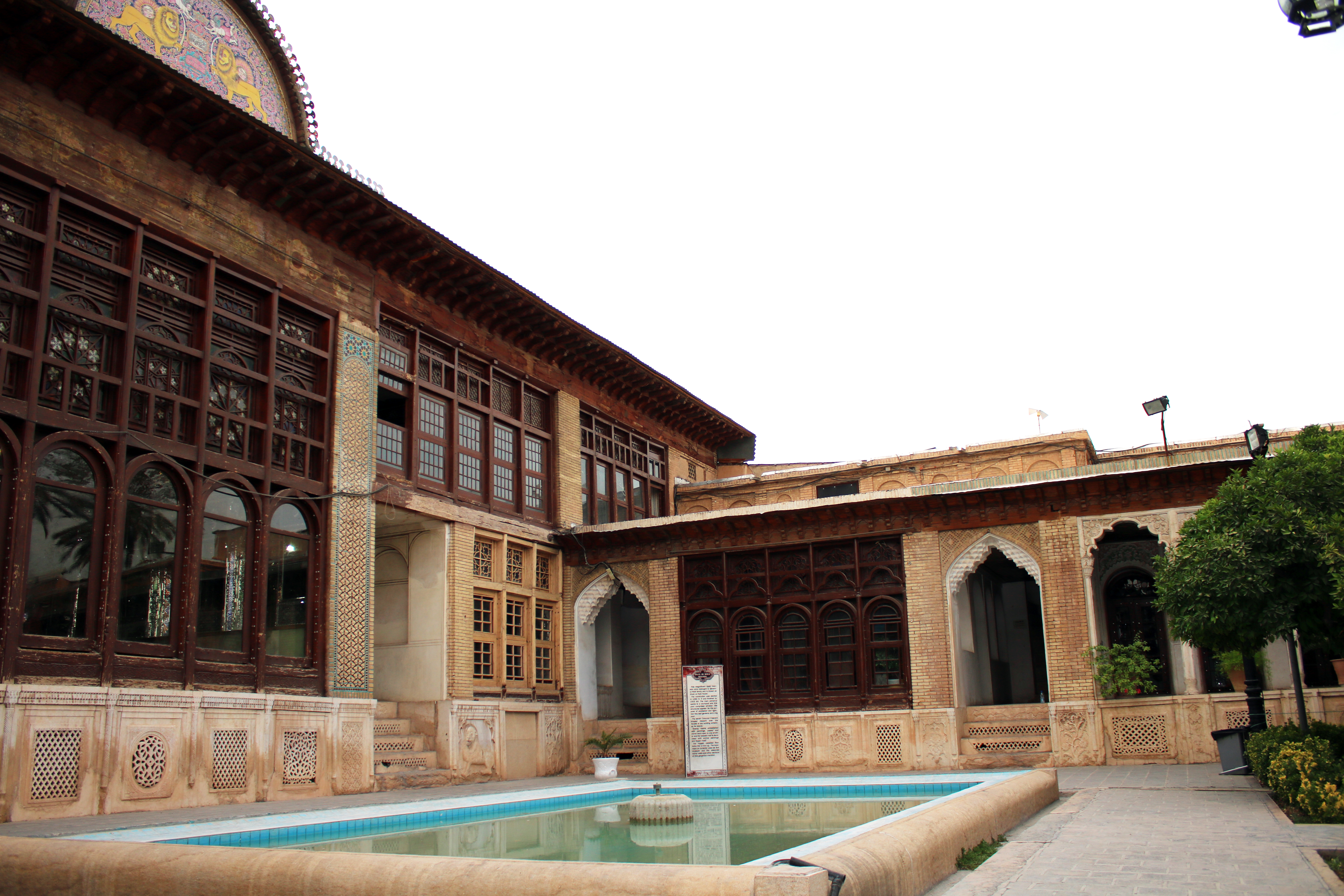
Zinat ol Molk Mansion

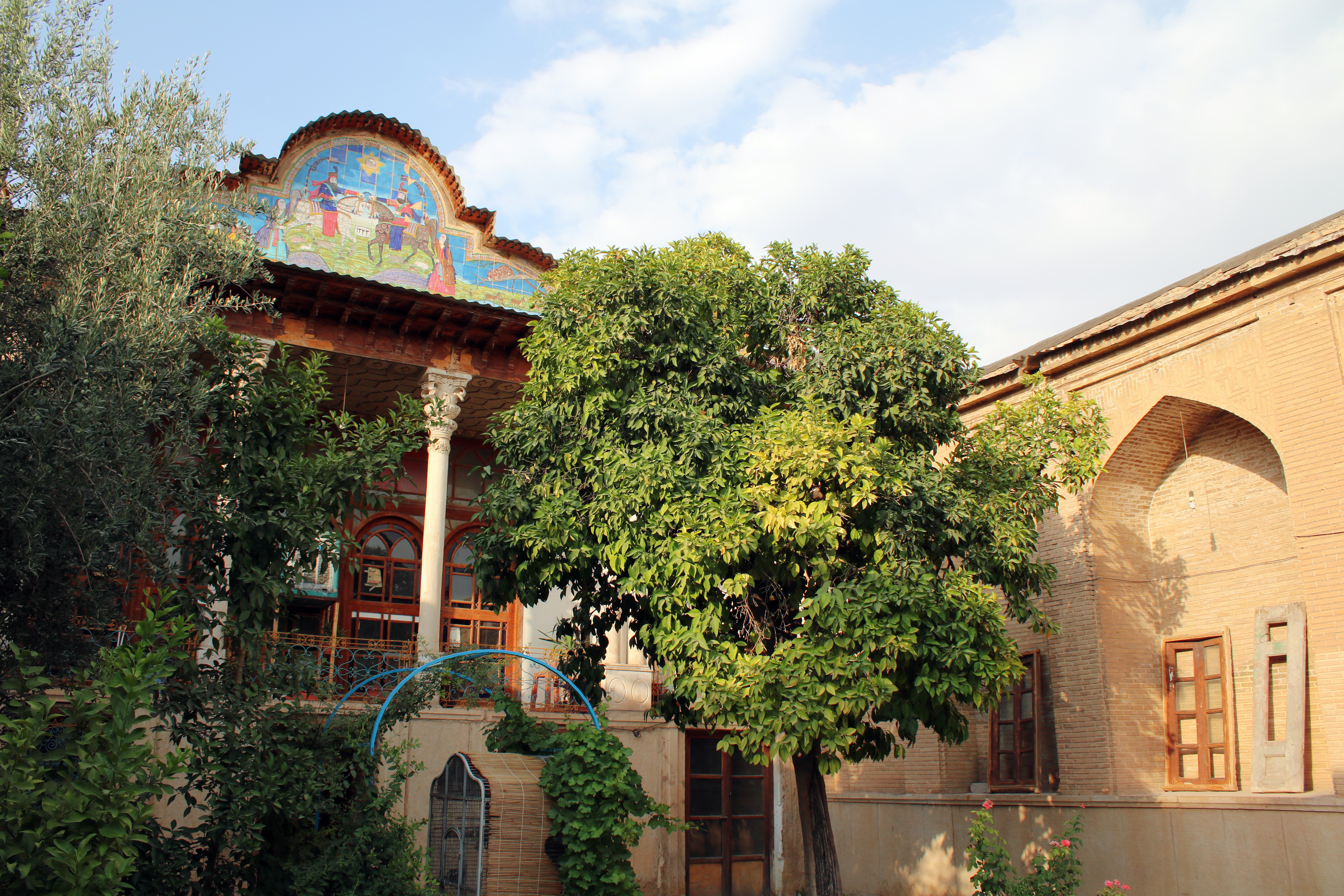
Saadat Mansion

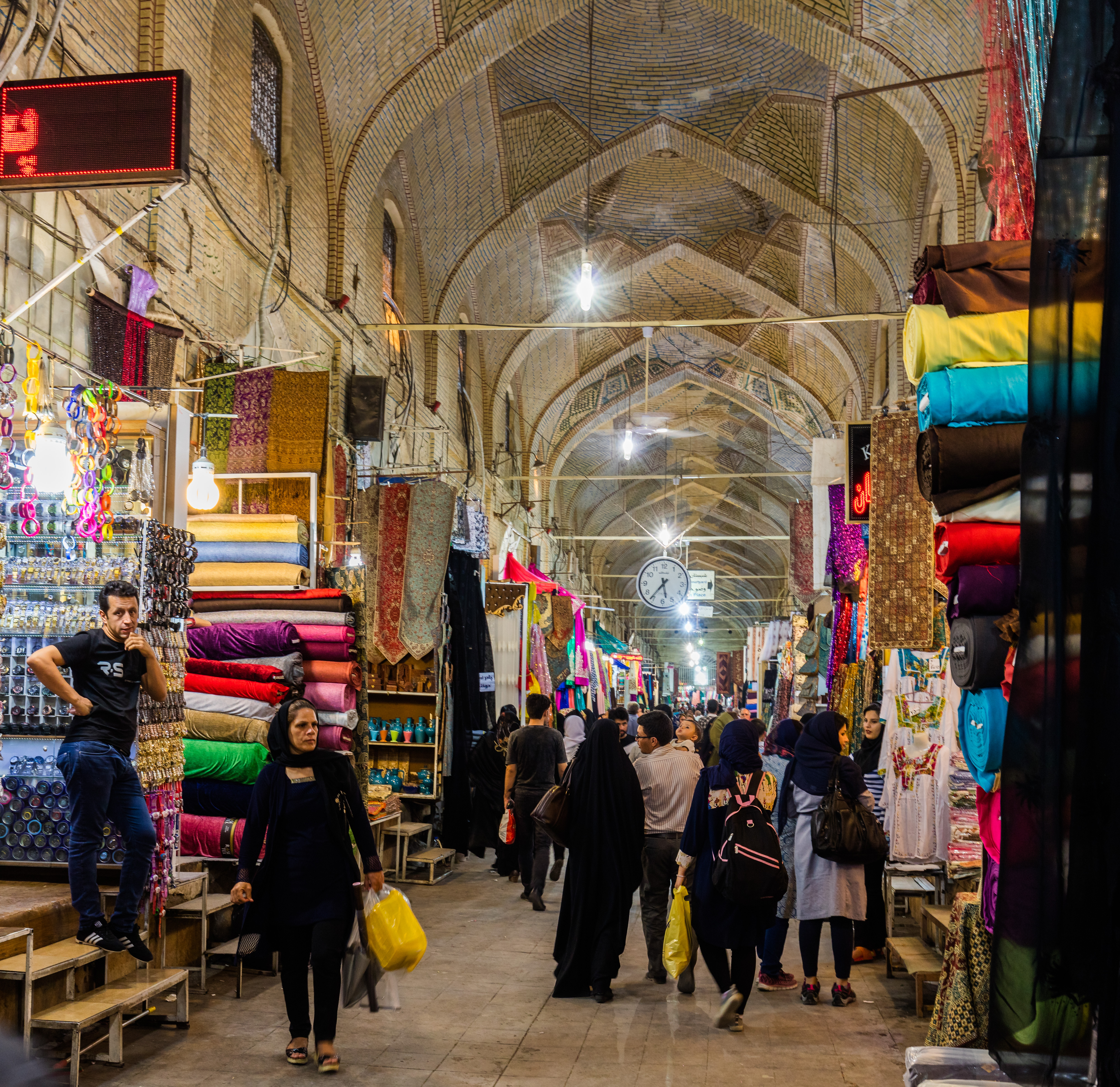
Vakil Bazaar

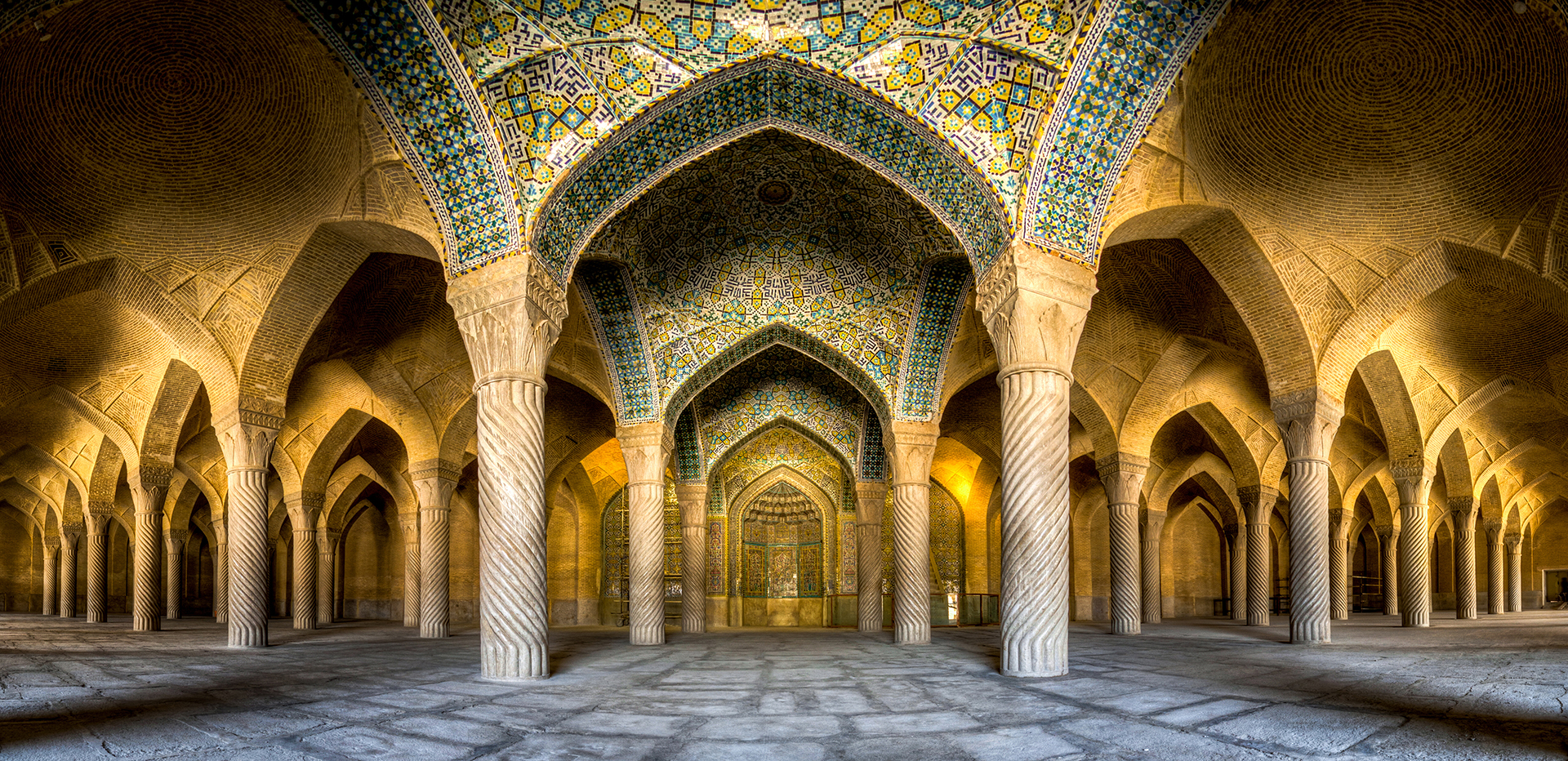
Vakil Mosque

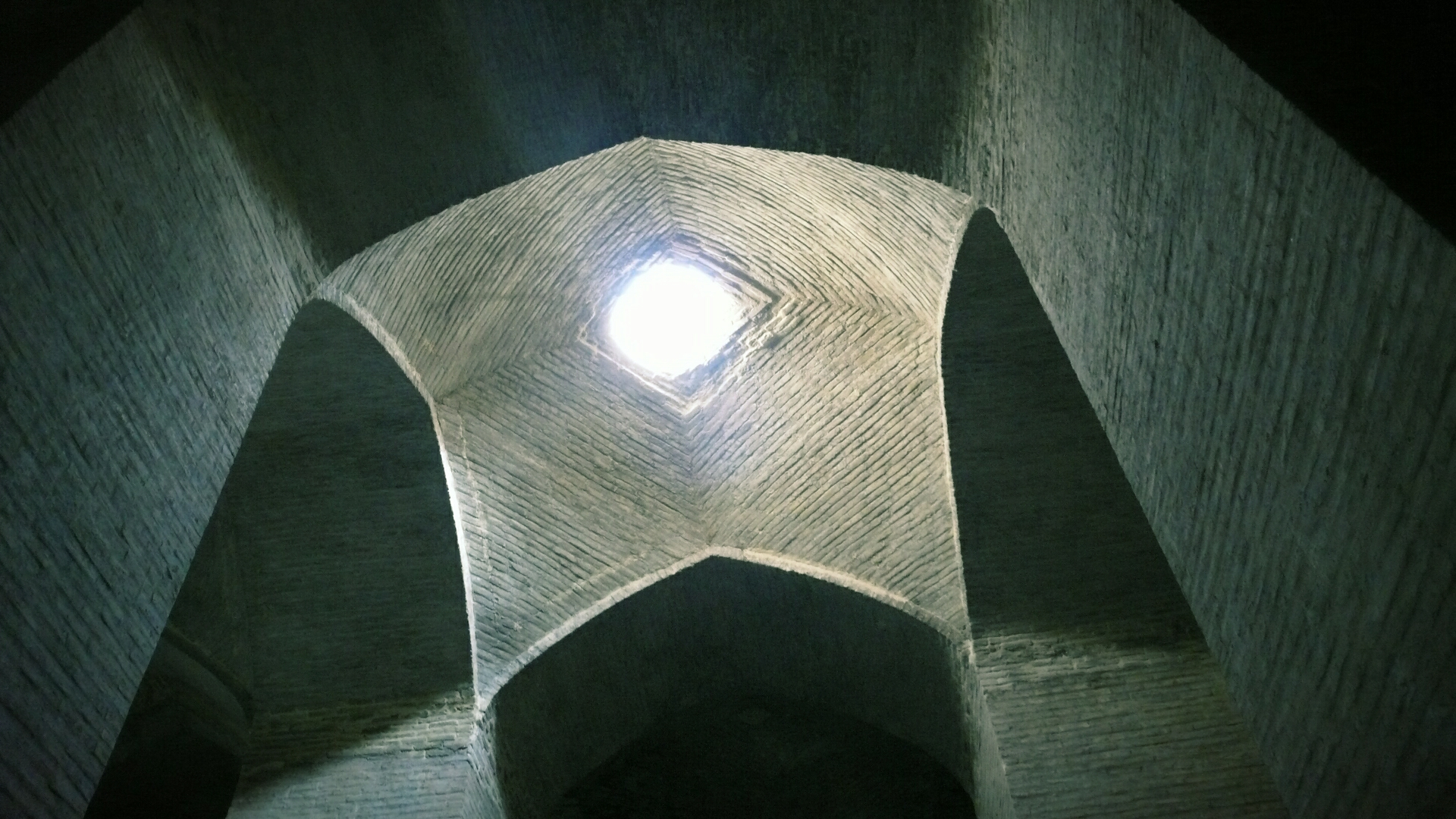
Water Museum

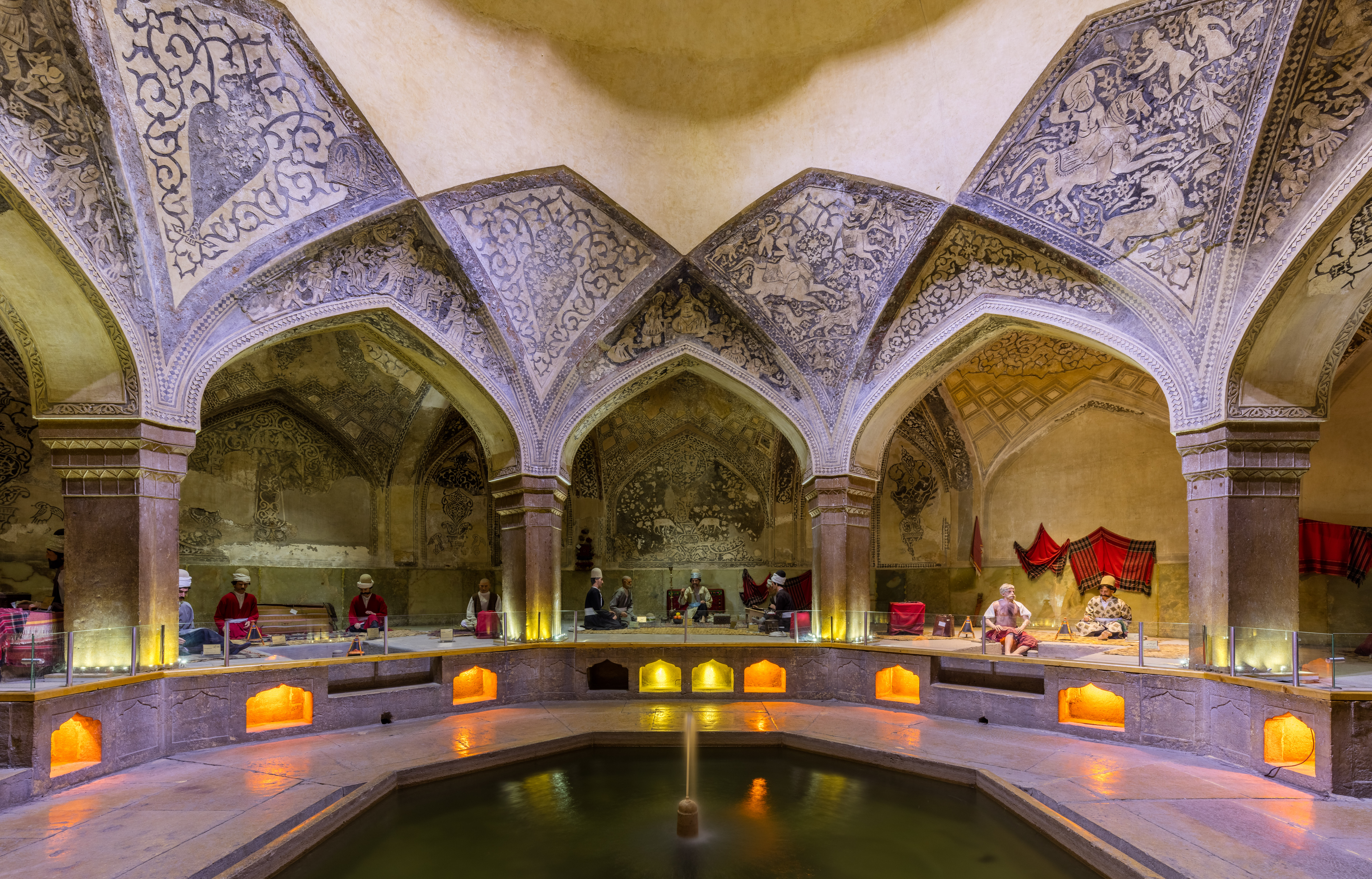
Vakil Bath

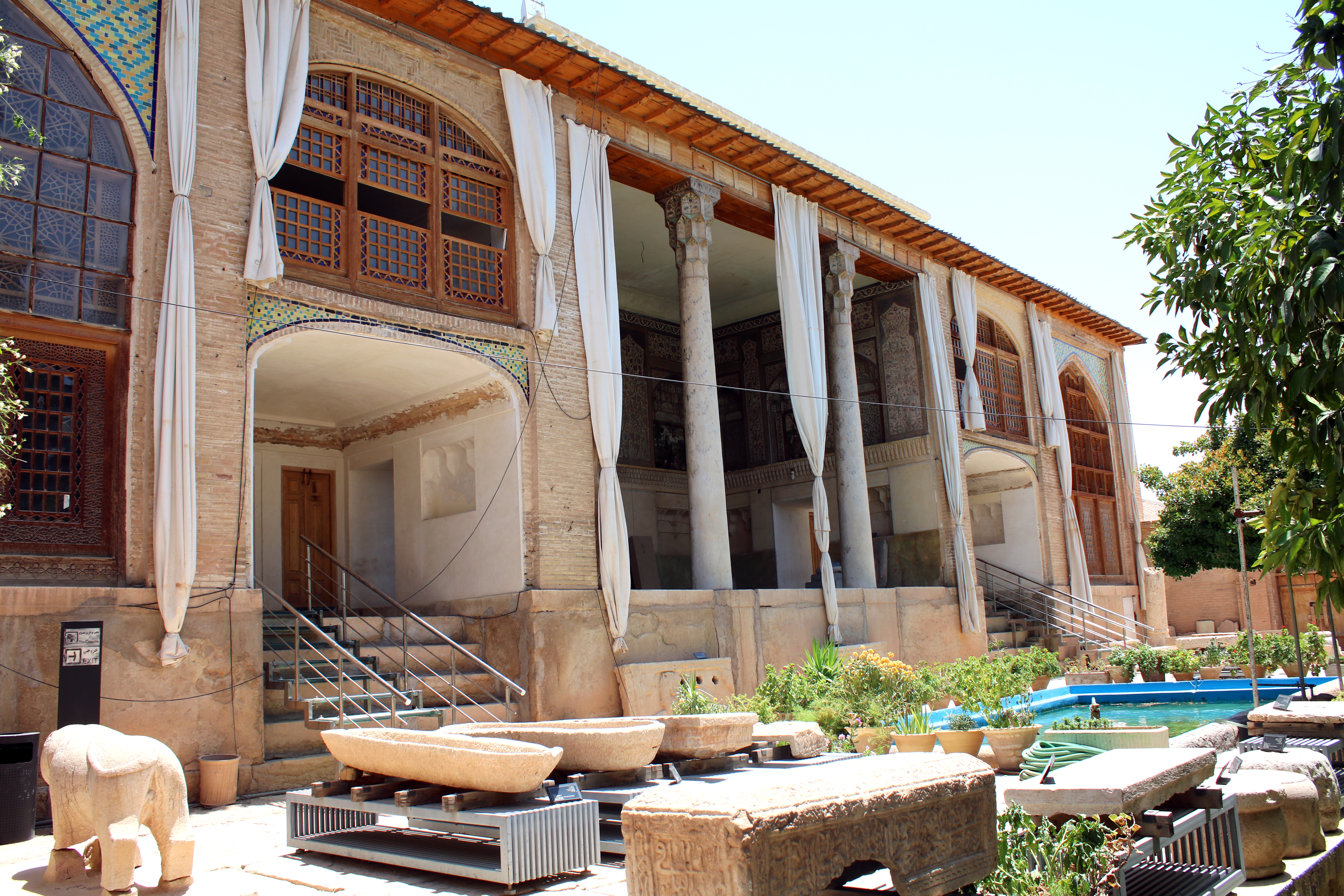
Stone Museum

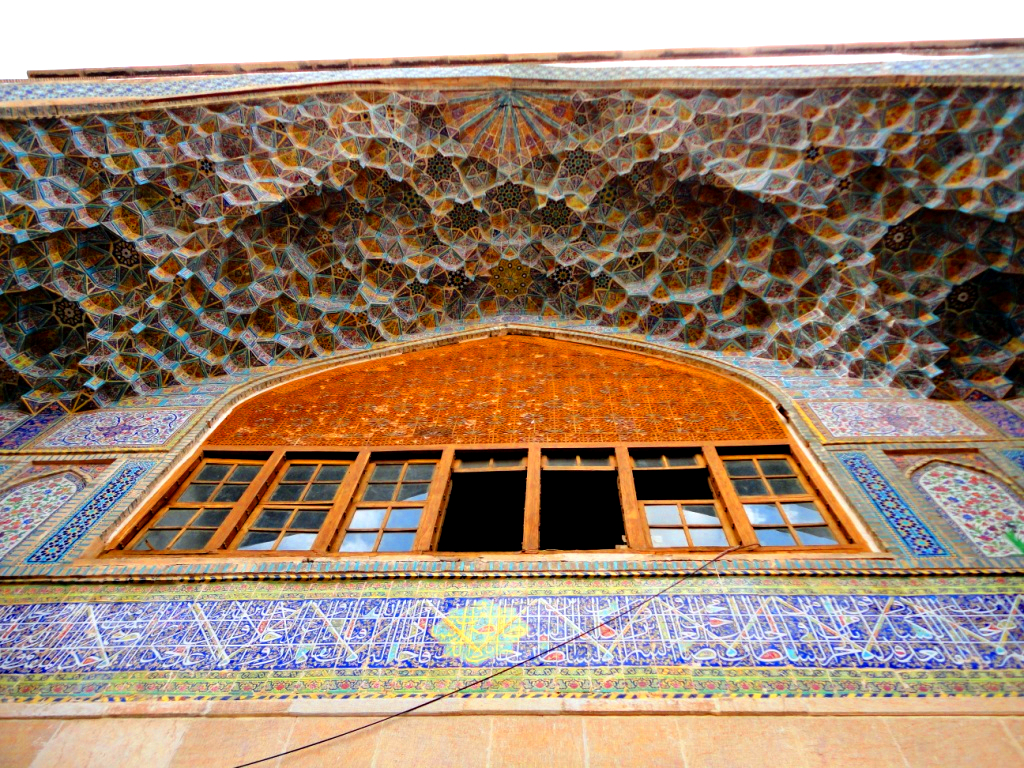
Khan School
- Margoon Waterfall is located in the Fars province of Iran near the city of Sepidan.
- Shapur Cave is located in the Zagros Mountains, in southern Iran, about 6 kilometres (3.7 miles) from the city of Bishapur.
- Sangtarashan cave is located in the Jahrom, in southern Iran.
- Palace of Ardashir, also known as the Atash-kadeh, is a castle located on the slopes of the mountain on which Dezh Dokhtar is situated. Built in AD 224 by King Ardashir I of the Sasanian Empire, it is located two kilometres (1.2 miles) north of the ancient city of Gor.
- Pooladkaf is a ski resort in the south of Iran. It opened in 2002.
- The Sarvestan Palace is a Sasanian era building in the Iranian city of Sarvestan.
- Qal'eh Dokhtar, is a castle made by Ardashir I, in present-day Fars, Iran, in 209 AD.
- Maharloo Lake. Maharloo is a seasonal salt lake about an hour away from Shiraz, with a dominant pink hue because of the amount of red tide in it; however, the strength of the color differs in various times of the year. It is also known as the pink lake.
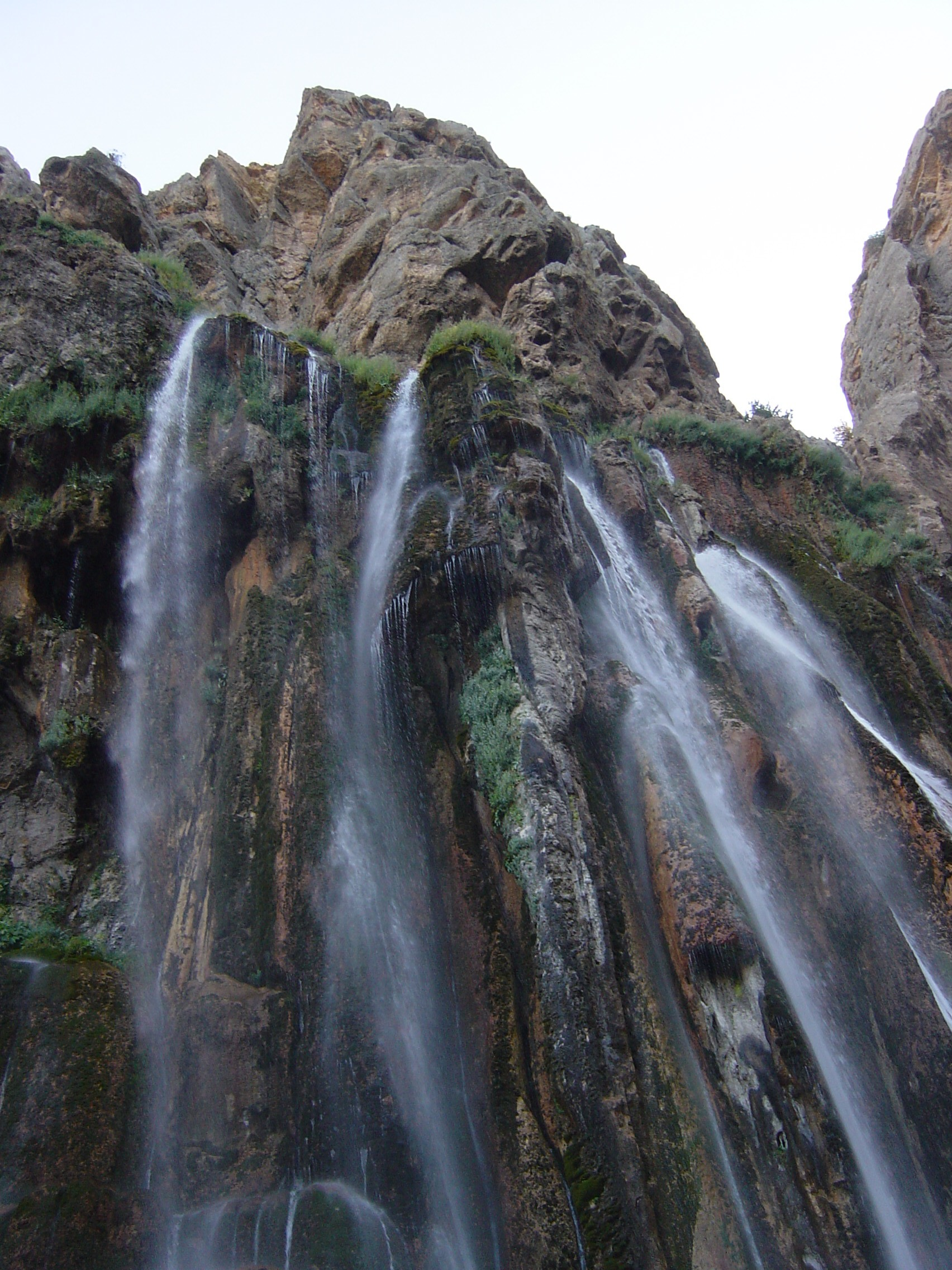
Margoon Waterfall

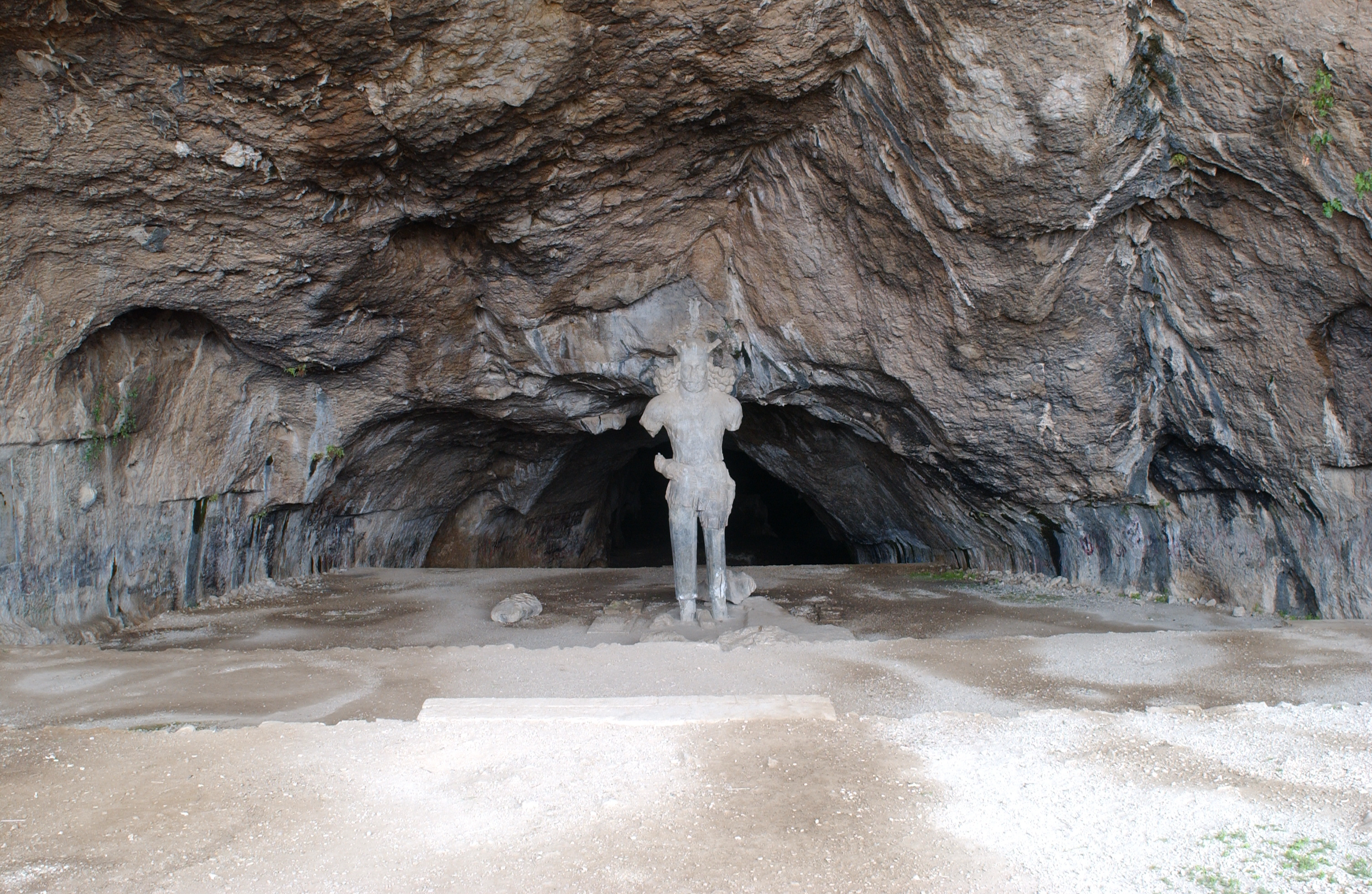
Shapur cave

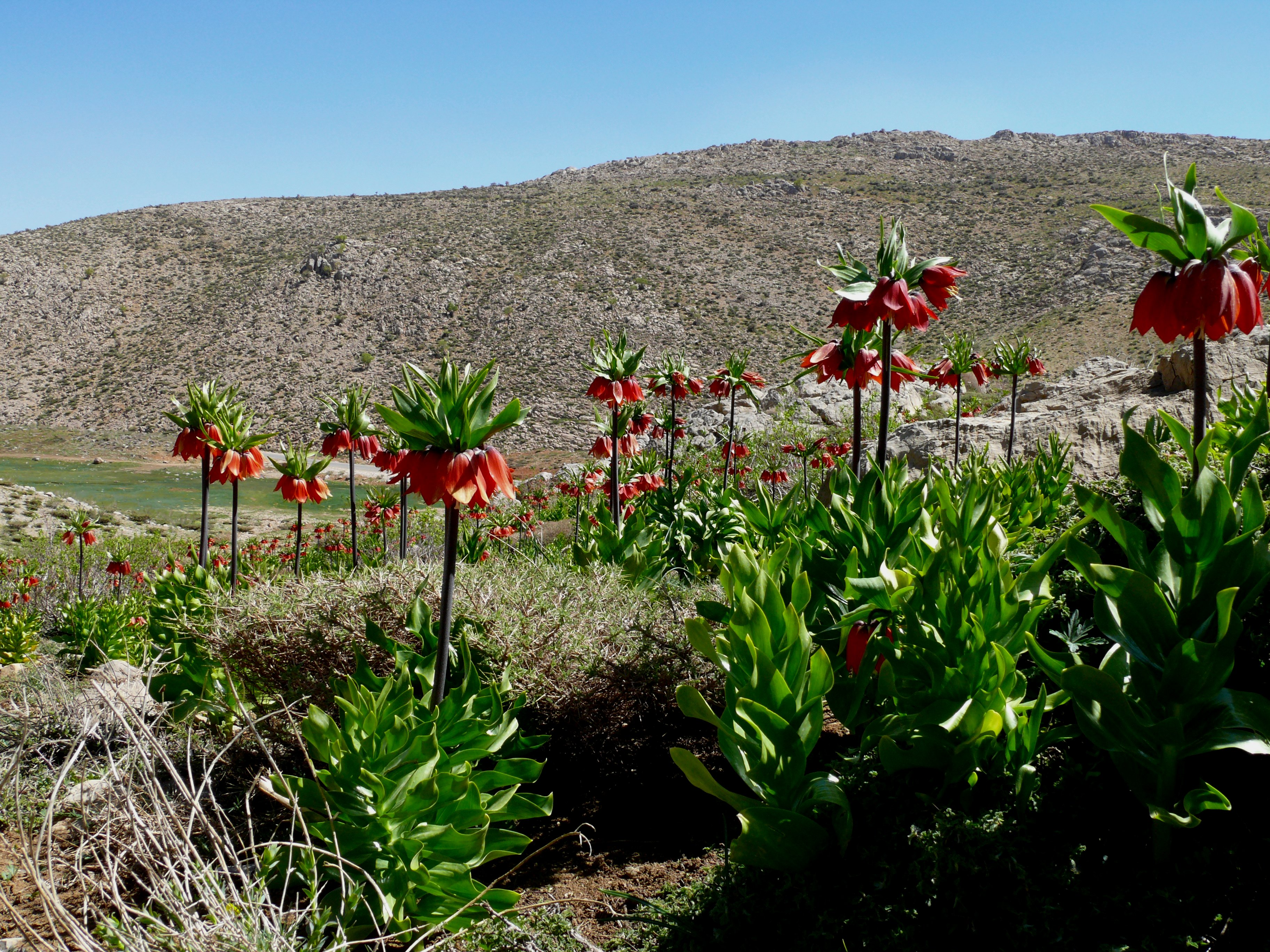
Plain of Fritillaria imperialis, Sepidan County

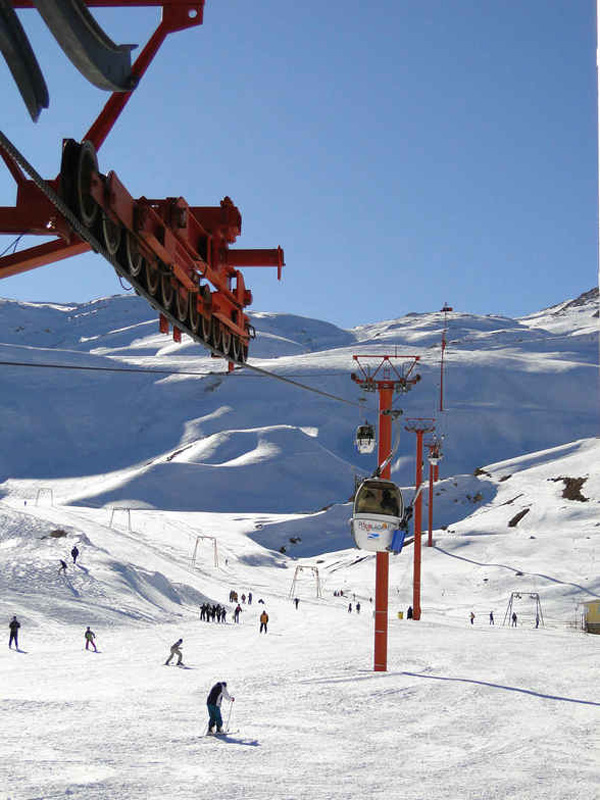
Pooladkaf Ski Resort

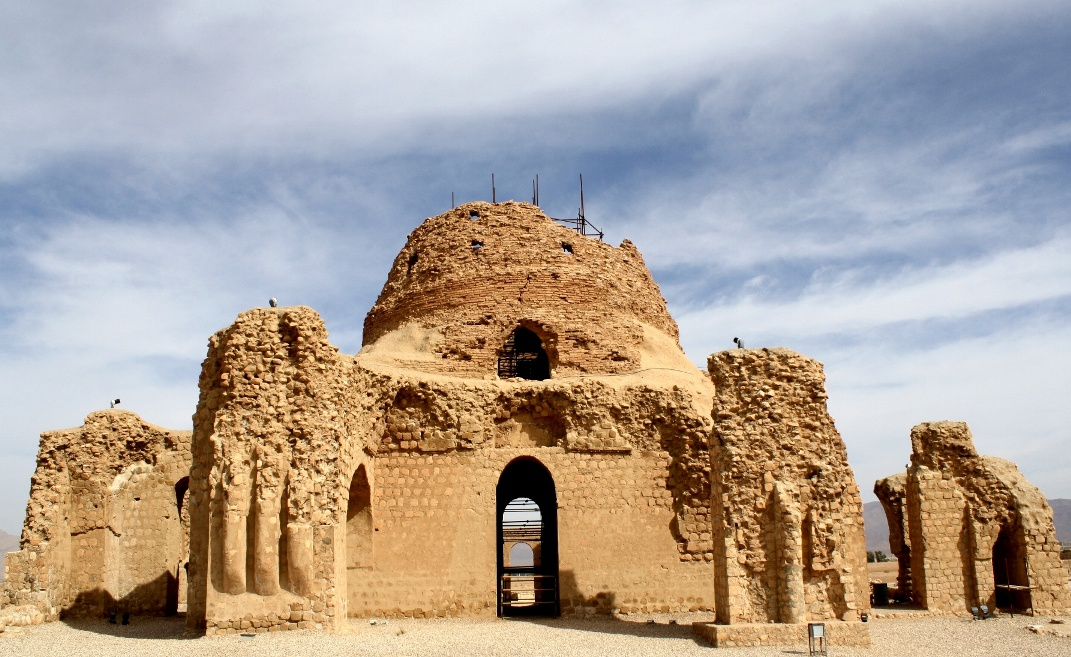
Sassanid Palace at Sarvestan

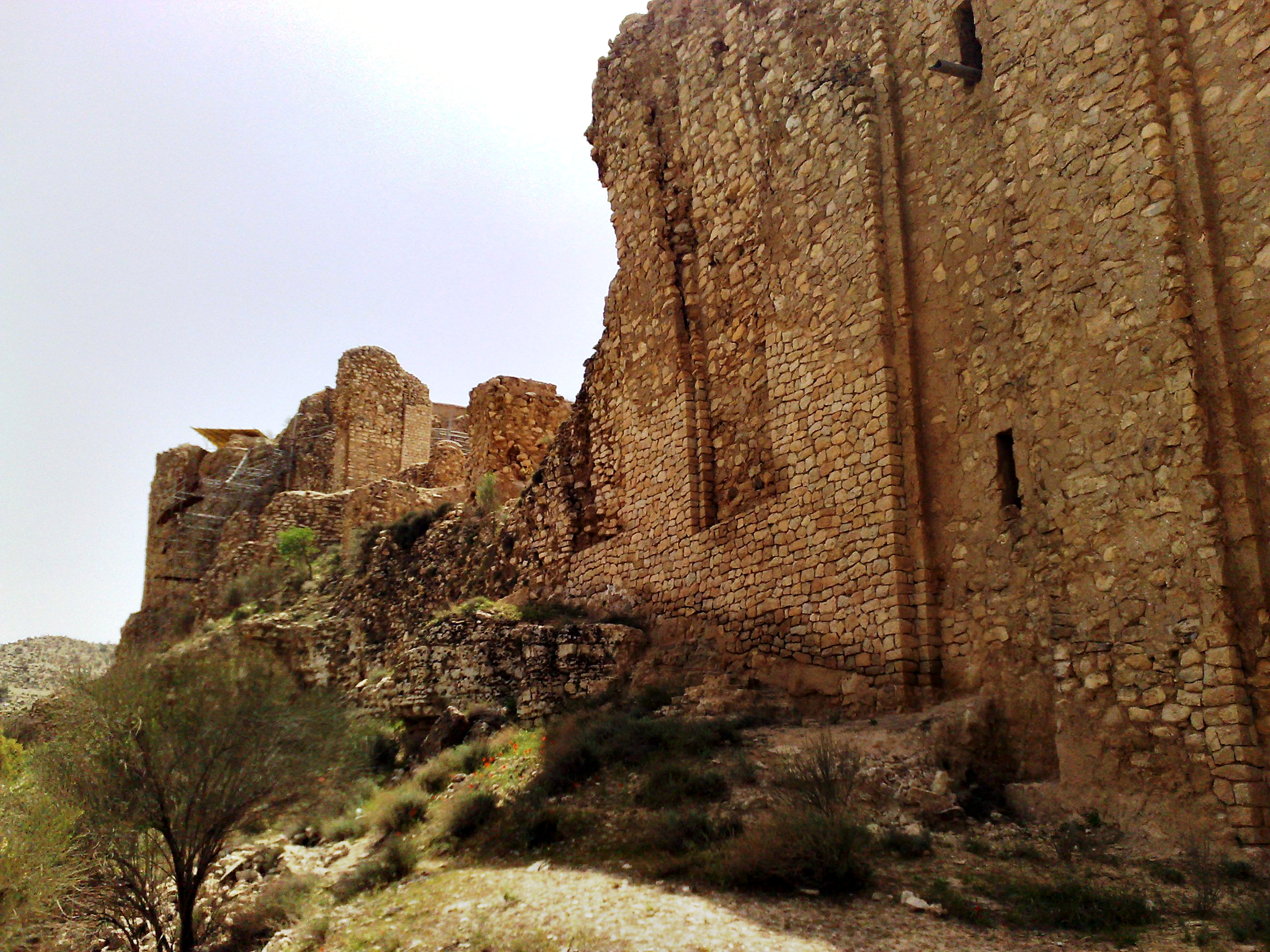
Qal'eh Dokhtar

== Higher education ==
Shiraz is home to a vibrant academic community. The Shiraz University of Medical Sciences was the first university in Shiraz and was founded in 1946. Much older is the august Madrasa-e-Khan, or Khan Theological School, with about 600 students; its tile-covered buildings date from 1627.

Today Shiraz University is the largest university in the province, and one of Iran's best academic centers. Other major universities in or nearby Shiraz are the Islamic Azad University of Shiraz, Shiraz University of Technology, and Shiraz University of Applied Science and Technology.

The Shiraz Regional Library of Science and Technology is a provincial library serving the public. Virtual University of Shiraz is one of the sub colleges of Shiraz University.

== Transportation ==
=== Air ===
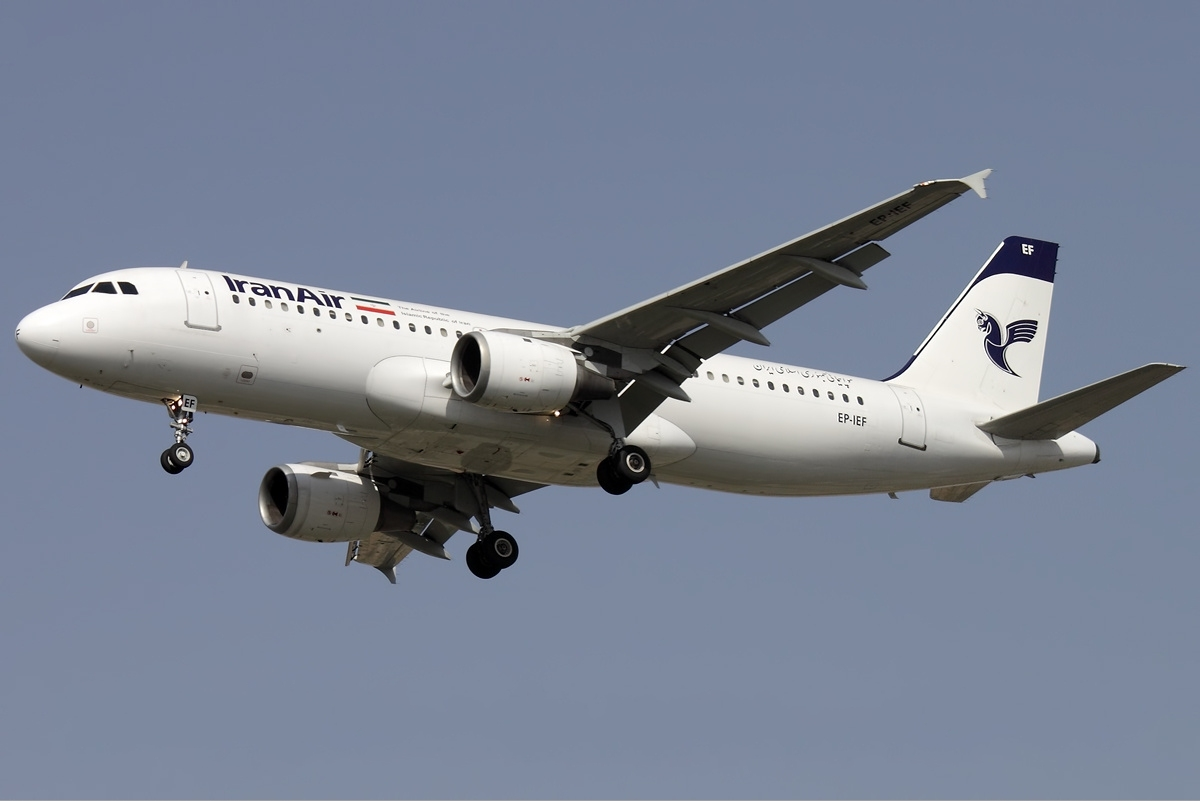
An Iran Air Airbus A320 approaching Shiraz International Airport (2011)

Shiraz International Airport, also known as Shiraz Shahid Dastgheib International Airport, serves as the largest airport in southern Iran.

=== Metro ===
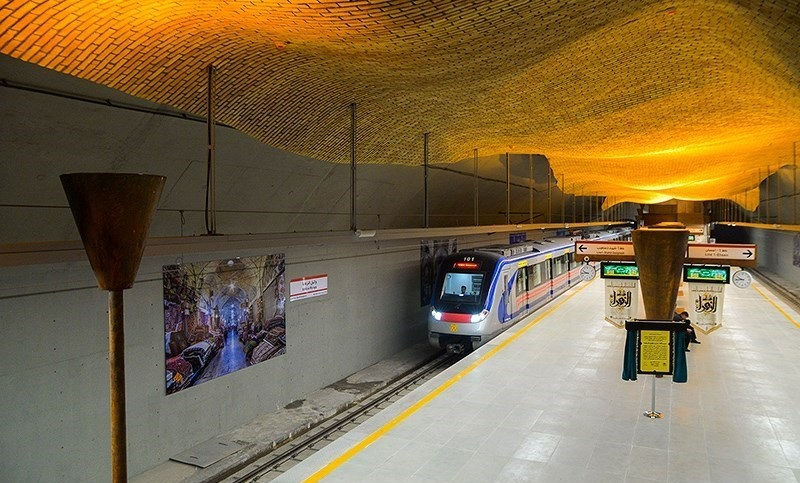
Shiraz Metro

Construction of a metro system was started in 2001 by the Shiraz Urban Railway Organization. The plan is to create six lines. The length of the first Line is 22.4 km (13.9 mi), the length of the second line will be approximately 14 km (8.7 mi).

The first three lines, when completed, will have 32 stations below ground, six above, and one special station connected to the railway station. The first line was started in October 2014 between Shahid Dastgheib (airport) Metro Station and Ehsan stations.

=== Bus ===
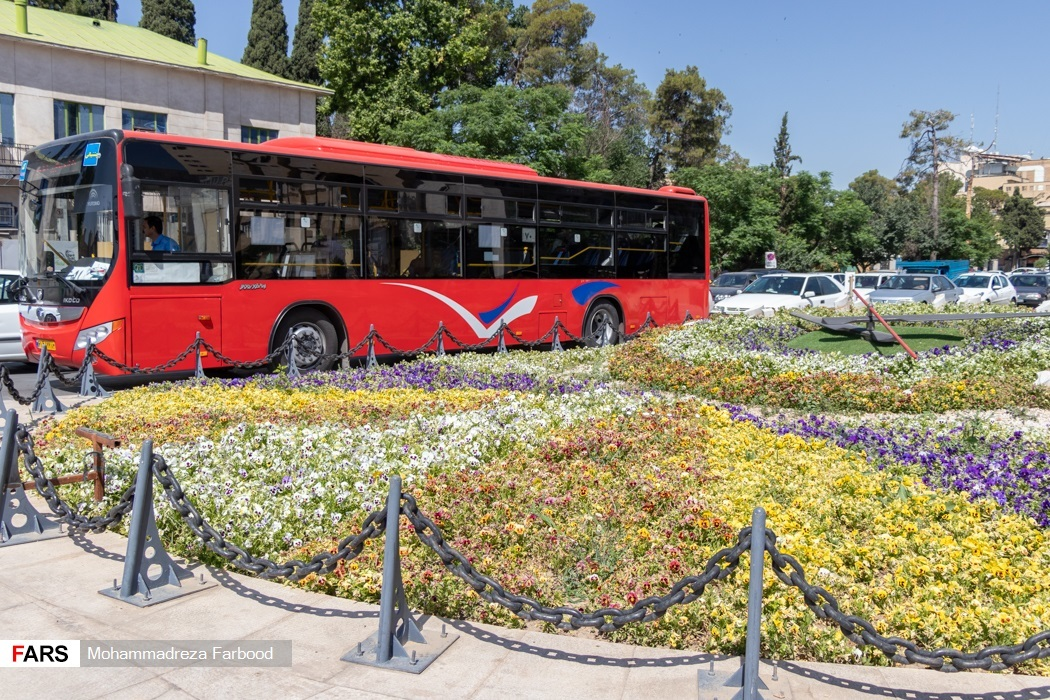
Shiraz has the Iran's third Bus rapid transit.

The Shiraz and suburbs bus organization was established in 1966. In that year, the company purchased 10 buses from the Iran National Company using both cash and installments. The company had a staff of 10 drivers, 40 assistant drivers, 50 ticket sellers, and 10 repairmen and inspectors. The daily salary of each full-time driver (6 am to 10 pm) was set at 160 rials, while assistant drivers and ticket sellers were set at 83 rials. With the purchased buses, the company launched lines one, two, and three, which were welcomed by the people. Now Shiraz has 71 bus lines.

=== Rail ===
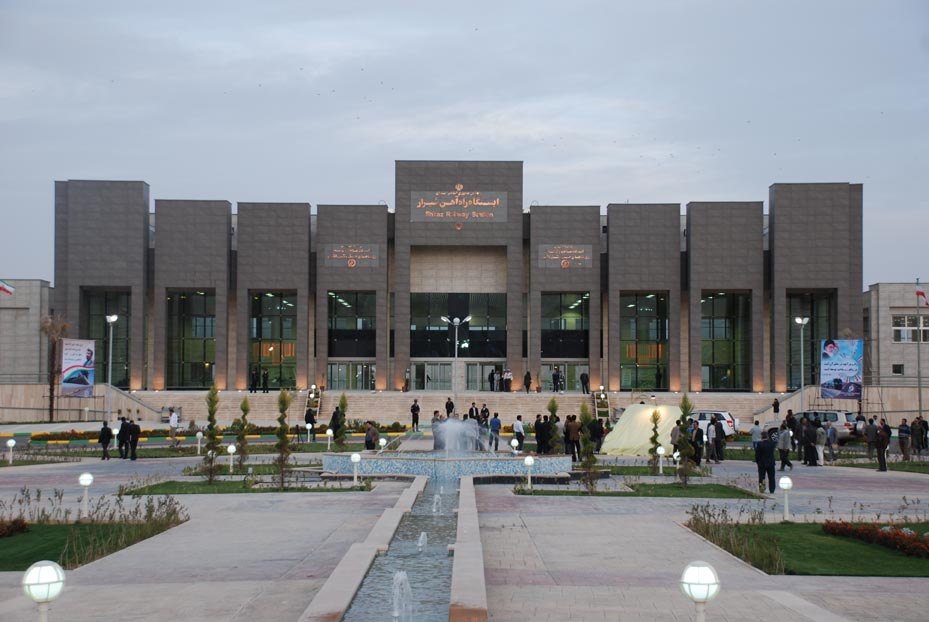
Shiraz Train Station

Shiraz is connected with the rest of Iran's railway network. The trains arrive and leave from Shiraz railway station, Iran's largest railway station according to surface area.

=== Roads ===
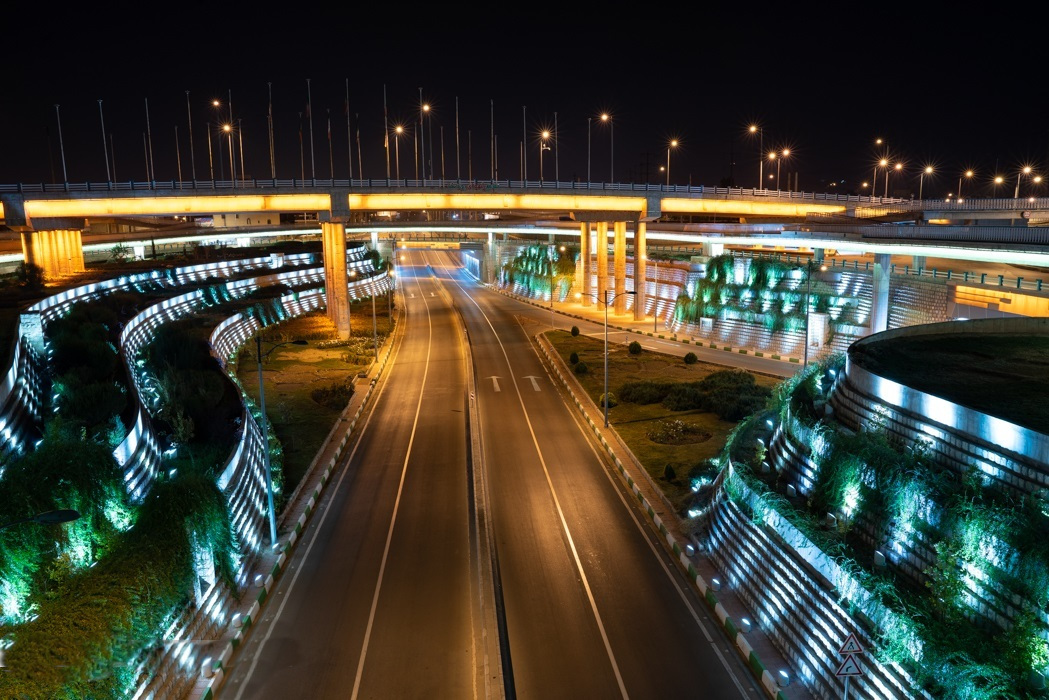
View of Shiraz roads and bridges in 2020

There are 700,000 cars in the city of Shiraz.

- Road 63
- Road 93

== Sports ==
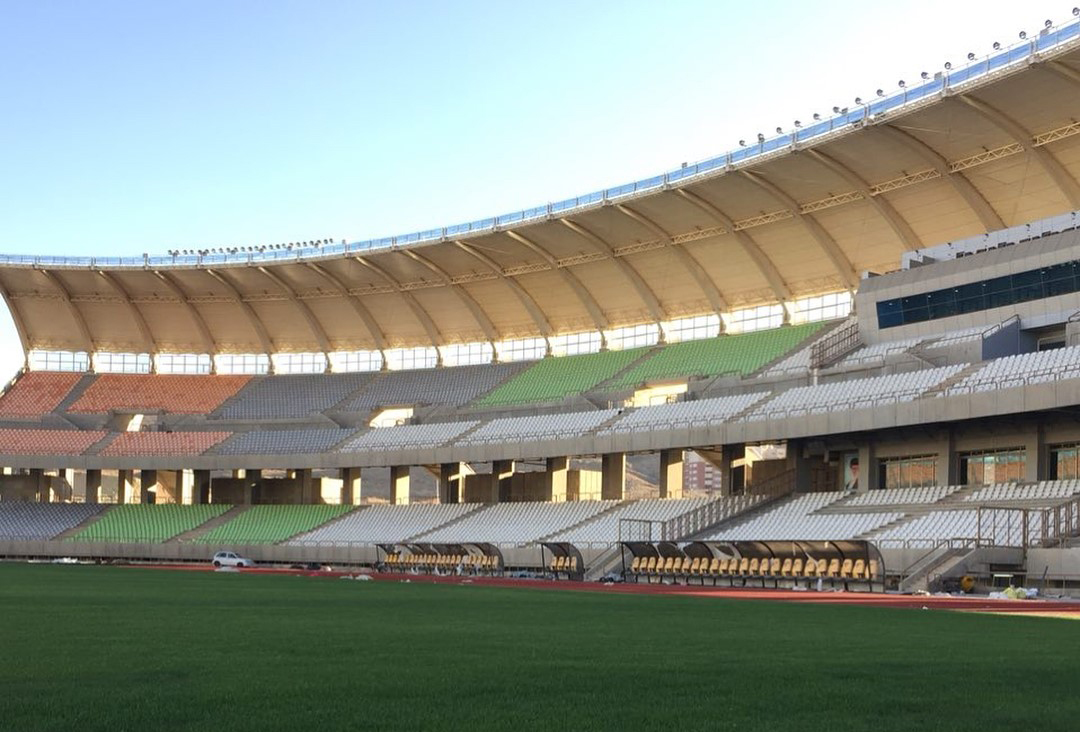
Pars Shiraz Stadium

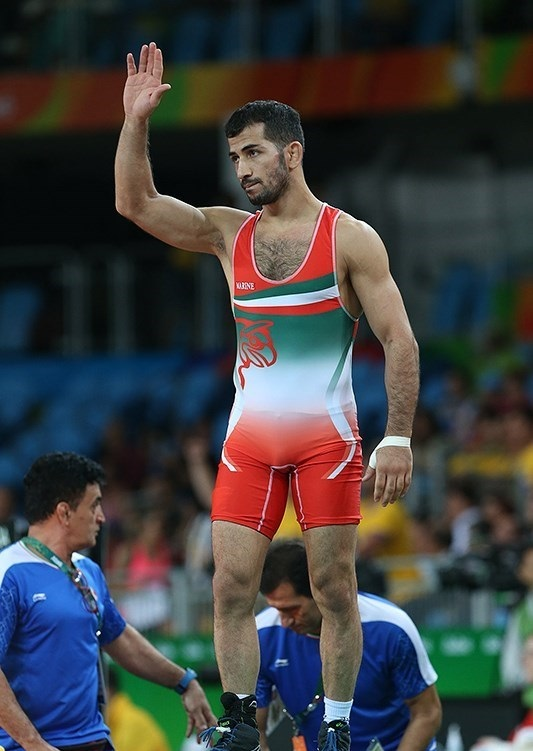
Omid Norouzi. 2012 Olympic gold medalist.

Hafezieh Stadium can hold up to 20,000 people and Pars Stadium, which was completed in 2017, can host up to 50,000 spectators.

== Notable people ==
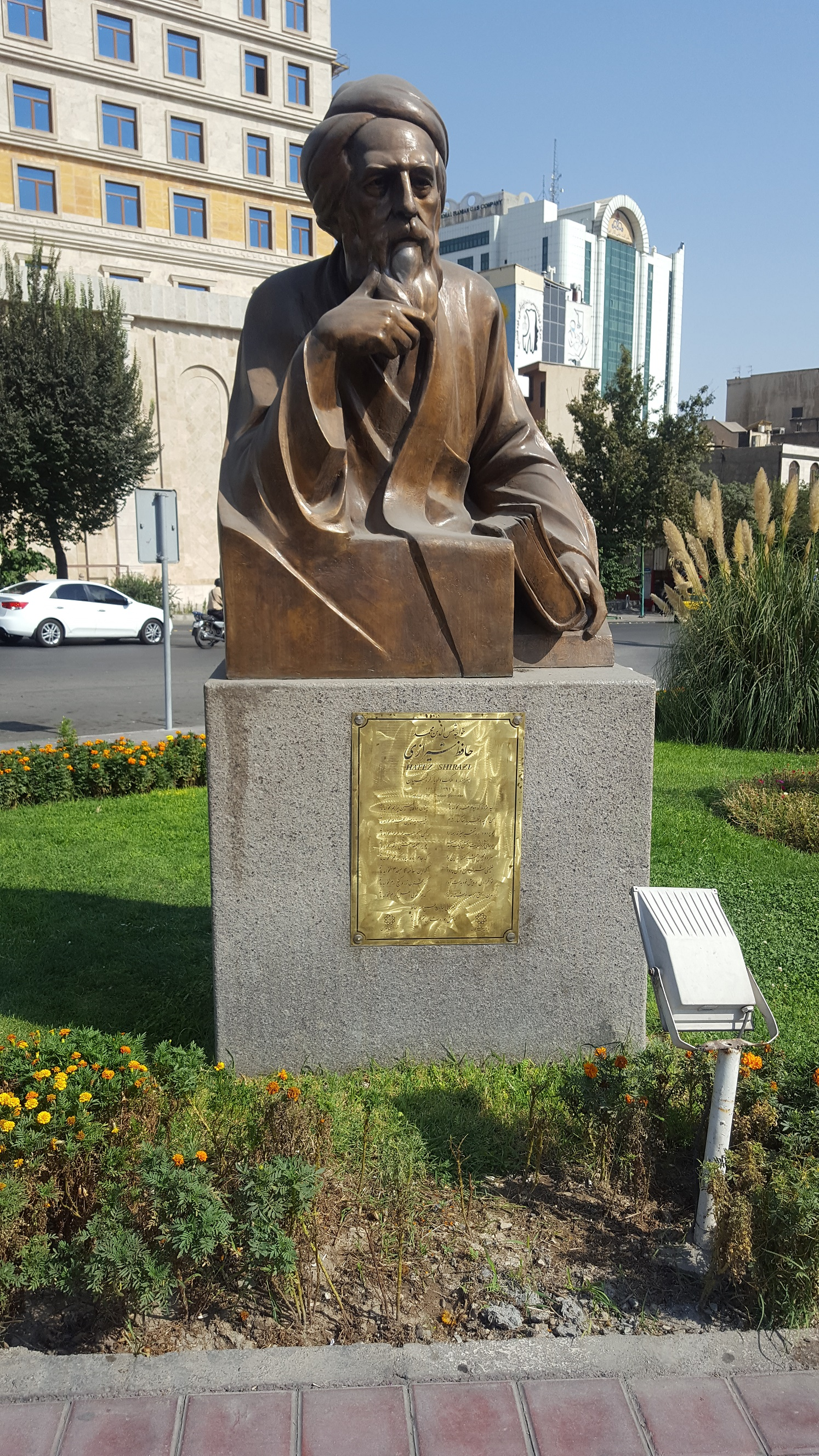
Hafez statue

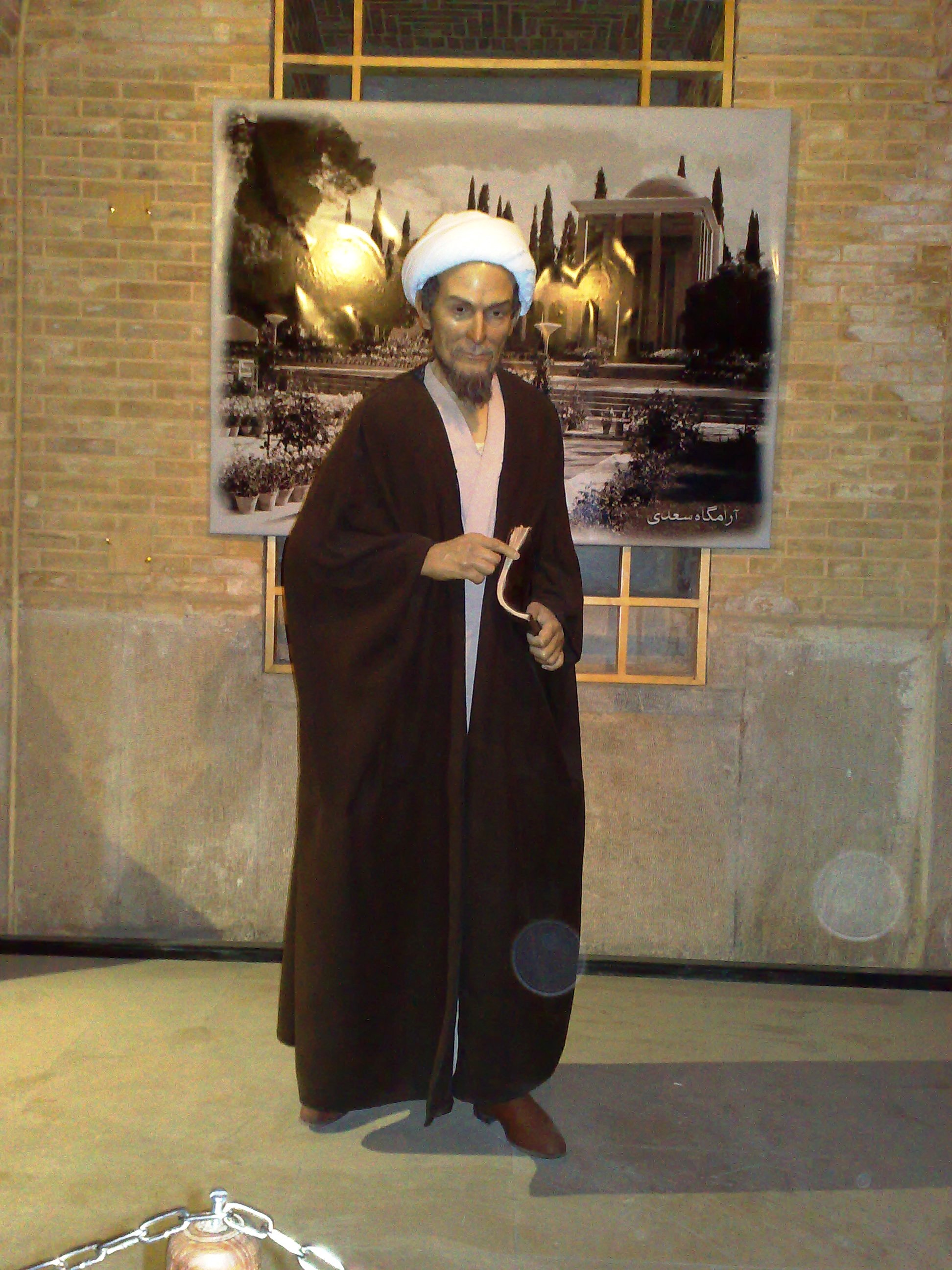
Saadi

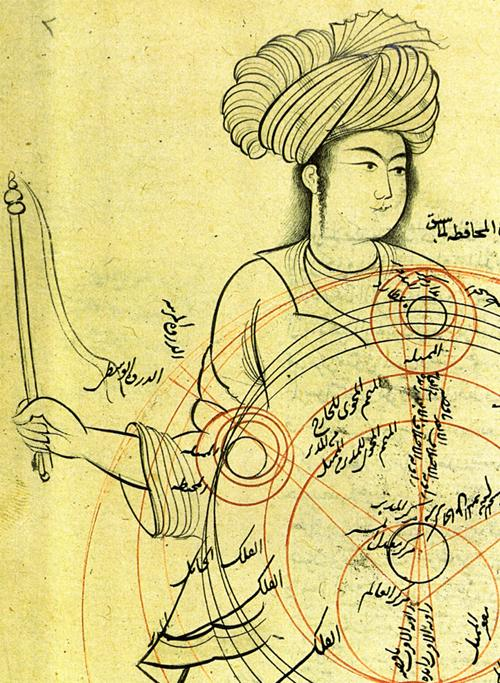
Qutb al-Din al-Shirazi

=== Rulers and political figures ===
- Absh Khatun, 13th-century ruler
- Karim Khan (1705-1779), ruler and de facto Shah of Iran from 1760 until 1779. He made Shiraz his capital.
- Jimmy Delshad (born 1940), Iranian-American 67th and 70th Mayor of Beverly Hills
- Zahra Kazemi-Ahmadabadi (1948–2003), Iranian-Canadian freelance photojournalist arrested, raped, tortured, and killed while in custody in Evin Prison
- Valerie Jarrett (born 1956), Iranian-American senior advisor to United States President Barack Obama, born in Shiraz to African-American parents.
- Kamran Bagheri (born 1965), was Iran's Minister of Health and Medical Education.

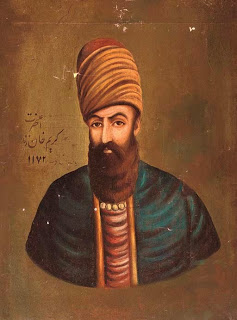
Portrait of Karim Khan Zand, by Mohammad Sadiq, 1758

=== Religious figures, philosophers and theologians ===
- Ezra Zion Melamed (1903–1994), Shiraz-born Israeli rabbi and biblical and Talmudic scholar, and lexicographer of Aramaic language; won the 1987 Israel Prize for his work in Biblical interpretation and Rabbinical literature
- Mulla Sadra (c. 1571/2 – c. 1635/40 CE / 980 – 1050 AH), Islamic philosopher and theologian who led the Iranian cultural renaissance in the 17th century
- Mirza Shirazi (1815–1895), Grand Ayatollah, and leader of the Tobacco Protest resulting in the cancellation of the British Empire's tobacco concession in Qajar Iran
- Mu'ayyad fi'l-Din al-Shirazi (c. 1000 CE/390 AH – 1078 CE/470 AH), lived during the Fatimid Caliphate and was considered one of the most learned scholars of that time, known as an author of Islamic books, a poet, and scientist.
- Siyyid 'Alí Muḥammad Shírází (1819–1850), the founder of Bábism, and one of three central figures of the Baháʼí Faith
- Reza Negarestani (1977-), a regular contributor to Collapse and the author of Cyclonopedia.

=== Academics and scientists ===
- Qutb al-Din al-Shirazi, 13th-century poet and scholar
- Sibawayh, linguist and grammarian of the Arabic language
- Firouz Naderi (1946–2023), scientist and director for Solar System Exploration at NASA's Jet Propulsion Laboratory (JPL)
- Gholam A. Peyman (born 1937), inventor of LASIK
- Ali Asghar Khodadoust (1935–2018), Professor of Ophthalmology, originator of the Khodadoust line method
- M. Hashem Pesaran (born 1946), economist, emeritus professor of economics at University of Cambridge
- Fatemeh Keshavarz (born 1952), Iranian-American Chair of Asian and Near Eastern Languages and Literature Department, Professor of Persian and Comparative Literature, Washington University in St. Louis

=== Poets and writers ===
- Simin Daneshvar, novelist and author
- Abdolali Dastgheib (born 1931), literary critic writer
- Shahriyar Mandanipour (born 1957), writer
- Saadi, poet of the medieval period
- Homa Sarshar (born 1946), Iranian-American author, activist, media personality, and award-winning journalist
- Hafez, poet
- Mehdi Hamidi Shirazi (1914–1986), contemporary poet and professor
- Fereidoon Tavallali (1917–1985), contemporary poet and intellectual

=== Other artists ===
- Bahram Dabiri (born 1979), painter and artist
- Shirazeh Houshiary (born 1955), artist, born in Shiraz in 1955. She lives in London.
- Arsi Nami (born 1984), award-winning singer and songwriter
- Ebrahim Golestan (1922–2023), writer and filmmaker
- Gholamhossein Saber (born 1941), painter
- Afarin Sajedi (born 1979), painter, illustrator
- Tooji (born 1987), singer, model and television host. He represented Norway in the Eurovision Song Contest 2012 in Baku, Azerbaijan.
- Bahar Pars (born 1979), actress

=== Others ===
- Mohammad Bahmanbeigi, activist, founding father of instructions for tribes in Iran
- Sorour Darabi (born 1990), a member of the ICCD, based in Paris because hers is a form of dance that is taboo in Iran
- Abbas Dowran, fighter jet pilot who died during the Iran–Iraq War
- Eghbal Hamidy, Formula One car designer for Williams, Stewart, Arrows, and Jordan
- Zahra Kazemi (1948–2003) Iranian-Canadian freelance photographer, arrested for taking photos of a protest and beaten and slain in custody in Evin Prison while a political prisoner.
- Moshtari Khanum (c. 1786 – c. 1883), a dancer of the Qajar era
- Jamaluddin Mostaghimi (born 1916), physician
- Rayehe Mozafarian (born 1986), women and children rights activist, researcher; the founder of Stop FGM Iran, focused on eliminating female genital mutilation
- Mohammad Namazi (1896–1972), philanthropist and founder of the Namazi hospital in Shiraz. This later became the catalyst for the establishment of Shiraz University of Medical Sciences.
- Omid Norouzi, Iranian wrestler, world and Olympic champion
- Nahid Persson Sarvestani (born 1960), Swedish-Iranian documentary filmmaker.

== International relations ==
=== Twin towns – sister cities ===
Shiraz is twinned with:

- Chongqing, China
- Dushanbe, Tajikistan
- Nanjing, China
- Novi Sad, Serbia (2023)
- Nicosia, Cyprus
- Pécs, Hungary
- Osaka, Japan
- Weimar, Germany

== See also ==
- 1853 Shiraz earthquake – killed at least 9,000 people
- Ahmadi Square
- Shiraz Arts Festival
- Shirazi salad – originated from and is named after Shiraz
- Swedish intervention in Persia
- Shiraz expedition

== Bibliography ==
- Lambton, Ann K. S. (1997). "Shīrāz". In Bosworth, C. E.; van Donzel, E.; Heinrichs, W. P. & Lecomte, G. (eds.). The Encyclopaedia of Islam, Second Edition. Volume IX: San–Sze. Leiden: E. J. Brill. pp. 772–479. ISBN 978-90-04-10422-8.
- Limbert, John (2004). Shiraz in the Age of Hafez: The Glory of a Medieval Persian City. Seattle and London: University of Washington Press. ISBN 0-295-98391-4.
- Berney, K. A.; Ring, Trudy, eds. (2013). Middle East and Africa: International Dictionary of Historic Places, Volume 4. Routledge. ISBN 978-1-884964-03-9.

Preceded by Mashhad	Capital of Iran (Persia); 1750–1794	Succeeded by Tehran
Preceded by -	Capital of Zand dynasty 1750–1794	Succeeded by Kerman
