= Muhammad ibn Musa al-Kazim =

Son of Musa al-Kazim

Muḥammad ibn Mūsā al-Kāẓim
- محمد بن موسى الکاظم

Personal life
- Resting place: Sabze-Ghaba Mausoleum, Dezful, Khuzestan, Iran
- Parents: Musa al-Kazim (father); Najma (or Tuktam) (mother)
- Other names: Sabze Ghaba; Sabz-e-Qaba
- Occupation: Imamzadeh
- Relations: Ali al-Rida (brother); Ahmad (brother); Abbas (brother); Fatima (sister); Husayn (brother); Ibrahim (brother); Isma'il (brother); Muhammad al-Abid (brother); Zayd (brother)

Religious life
- Religion: Shia Islam

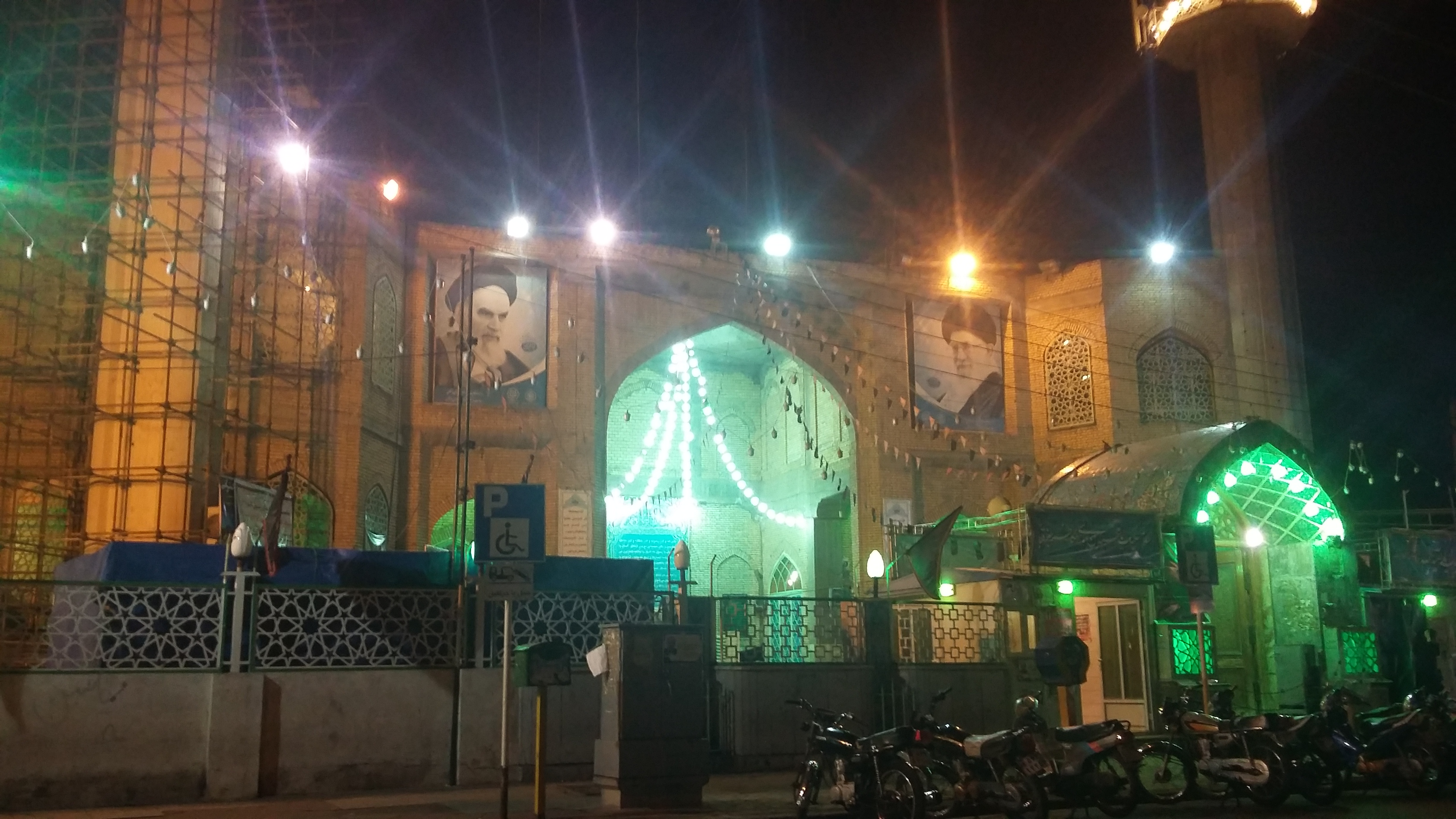
Sabze-Ghaba (Muhammad ibn Musa al-Kazim's) mausoleum, in Dezful, Khuzestan province of Iran

Muḥammad ibn Mūsā al-Kāẓim (Arabic: محمد بن موسى الکاظم) who is famous as Sabze Ghaba or Sabz-e-Qaba, is regarded as a prominent Imamzadeh who was the son of Imam Musa al-Kazim and also Imam Ali al-Rida's brother.

== Biography ==
Muhammad ibn Musa al-Kazim was born in Medina, and left that city due to the oppression of Abbasid dynasty and likewise in order to promote his father's thoughts and his brother's Imamate. Sabze Ghaba passed the Arabian peninsula, and went to Khorramshahr (from Basra), afterwards he moved towards Ahvaz, and eventually he entered Dezful.

According to Seyyed Nematollah Jazayeri, Muhammad ibn Musa al-Kazim is well known as Sabze Ghaba (which means green long garment) because he used to predominantly wear green clothes like other Alawians. Sabze Ghaba whose shrine is in the city of Dezful in the province of Khuzestan, died at the age of nineteen.
