= Shah Cheragh =

Funerary monument and mosque in Shiraz, Iran

- شاه چراغ
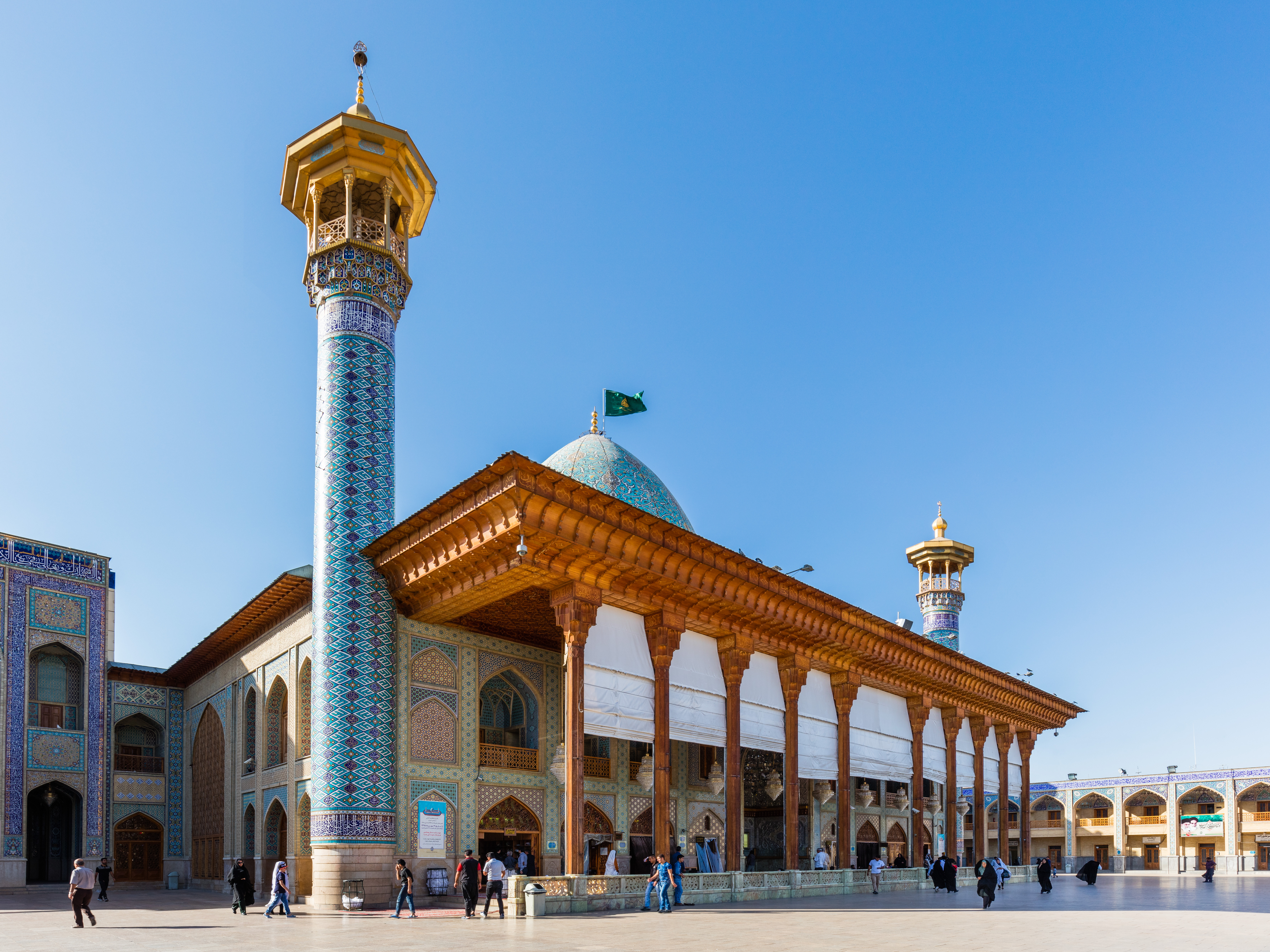
- The mausoleum exterior in 2016

- Location of the mausoleum in Iran

Religion
- Affiliation: Islam
- Branch/tradition: Shia (Twelver)
- Ecclesiastical or organisational status: Mausoleum and mosque
- Status: Active

Location
- Location: Shiraz, Fars
- Country: Iran
- Coordinates: 29°36′34.6″N 52°32′35.9″E

Architecture
- Type: Mosque architecture
- Style: Persian; Safavid; Qajar
- Established: 13th century (initial structure); 16th century (renovation); 18th century (reconstruction); 19th century (renovation)
- Completed: Safavid era

Specifications
- Dome: One (maybe more)
- Minaret: Two
- Shrine: One (Syed Amir Ahmad)
- Materials: Plaster; stone; ceramic tiles; glass
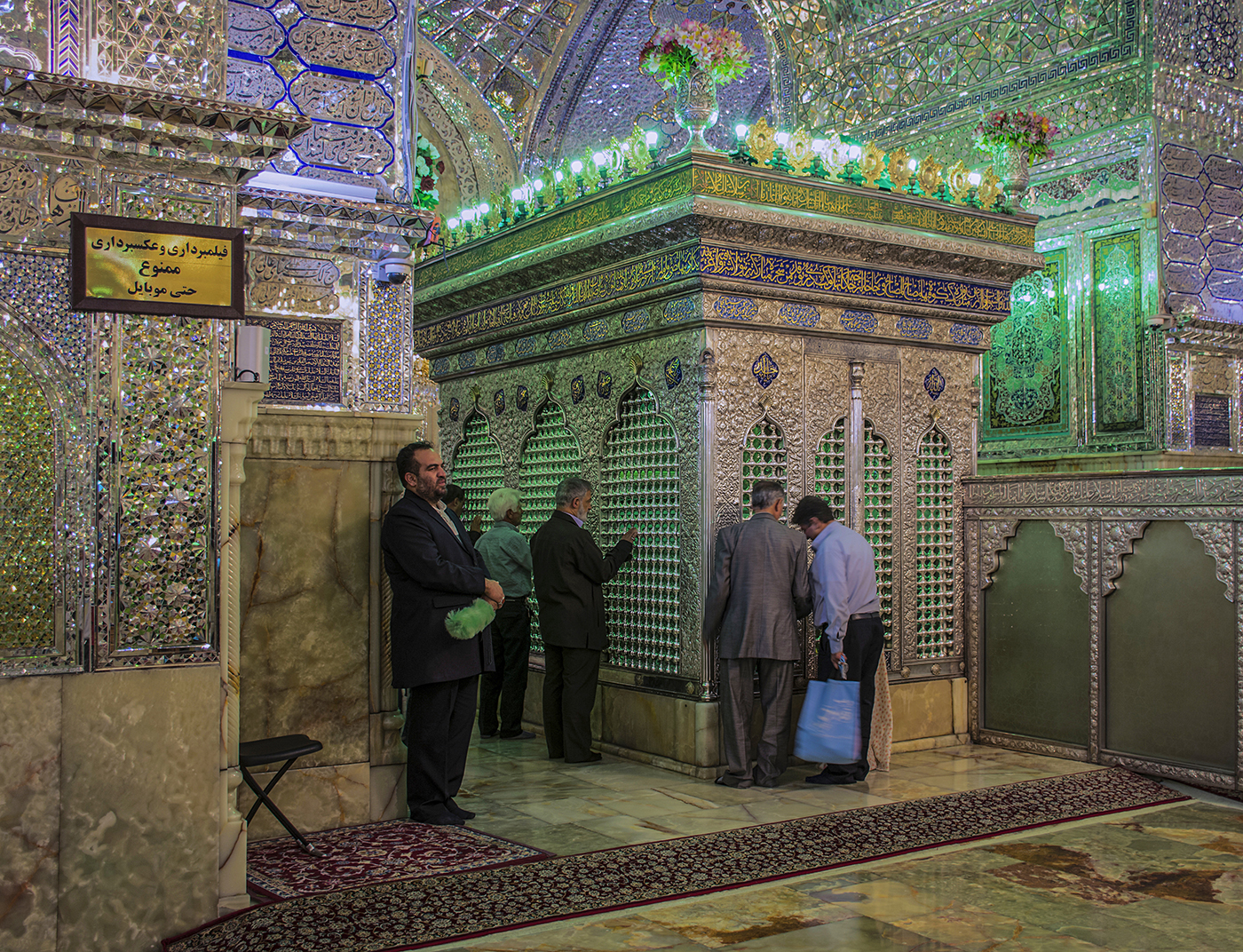
- Worshippers at the decorative tomb

Iran National Heritage List
- Official name: Shah-e Cheragh Shrine
- Type: Shrine
- Designated: 1942
- Reference no.: 363
- Conservation organization: Cultural Heritage, Handicrafts and Tourism Organization of Iran

The Shah Cheragh (Persian: شاه چراغ, romanized: Shāh-é-Chérāgh, lit. 'King of Light') is a Twelver Shia funerary monument and religious complex located in Shiraz, in the province of Fars, Iran. The 12th-century complex is centred around the mausoleums of Ahmad ibn Musa and Mir Muhammad ibn Mussa, two sons of the seventh Shia Imam Musa al-Kazim. Ahmad is known as Shah Cheragh (King of Light) in traditions, and hence the building's name. The complex was added to the Iran National Heritage List on 10 June 1942, administered by the Cultural Heritage, Handicrafts and Tourism Organization of Iran. The complex is a holy site in Shia Islam.

== History ==
Archaeological excavation indicates that there was a settlement on the site of Shiraz in the prehistoric period and cuneiform records from Persepolis, 57 kilometres (35 mi) to the north, show that Shiraz was a significant town in Achaemenian times. As a city however, it was founded in 684 CE, after the Arab armies conquered the Sassanians. The Buyids (945-1055 CE) made Shiraz their capital, building mosques, palaces and a great city wall. The 13th and 14th centuries saw Shiraz as a literary center, especially famous for poets Sa'adi and Hafez, both of whom are buried in the city. There are many splendid Islamic monuments in Shiraz, especially its enormous Jameh Mosque of Atigh. Following the Abbasid persecution of the Shi'ite sect, Sayyid Ahmad ibn Musa (also known as Seyyed Amir Ahmad) and his brother, Muhammad ibn Musa al-Kazim, both of whom were brothers of Ali al-Rida, took refuge in Shiraz. Amir Ahmad died or was murdered in 835 CE. The first structure over his grave, a simple domed mausoleum, was built in the 13th century during the rule of the Salghurids, by the minister, a former Buyid prince, attributed to Atabak Sa'ad Ebn-e-Zangi.

Local folklore tells that the grave was found when a light appeared over it, which caught the attention of the people, who told the minister about what they had seen. The tombs of both brothers became celebrated pilgrimage destinations in the 14th century, during the rule of the Injuids, when Queen Tashi Khatun, the mother of Ishaq Injoo, further expanded the structure, and erected a mosque and madrasa over the tomb. During the Safavid era in the 16th century, the building was extensively renovated. Then in the 18th century, Nader Shah donated a golden chandelier, which was hung under the dome. But a few years later, an earthquake struck Shiraz, and the complex of Shah Cheragh was heavily damaged by the tremors. The golden chandelier was lost during this time. A year after the earthquake, a man named Qandeel found some remains of the donated gold, which he used to fund the reconstruction of the Shah Cheragh funerary monument. In 1243 AH (1827/1828 CE), during the reign of Fath-Ali Shah Qajar, the second ruler of the Qajar dynasty, several repairs were made to the building, including a silver zarih installed around the grave. In 1958 CE, the dome was reconstructed.

== Architecture ==
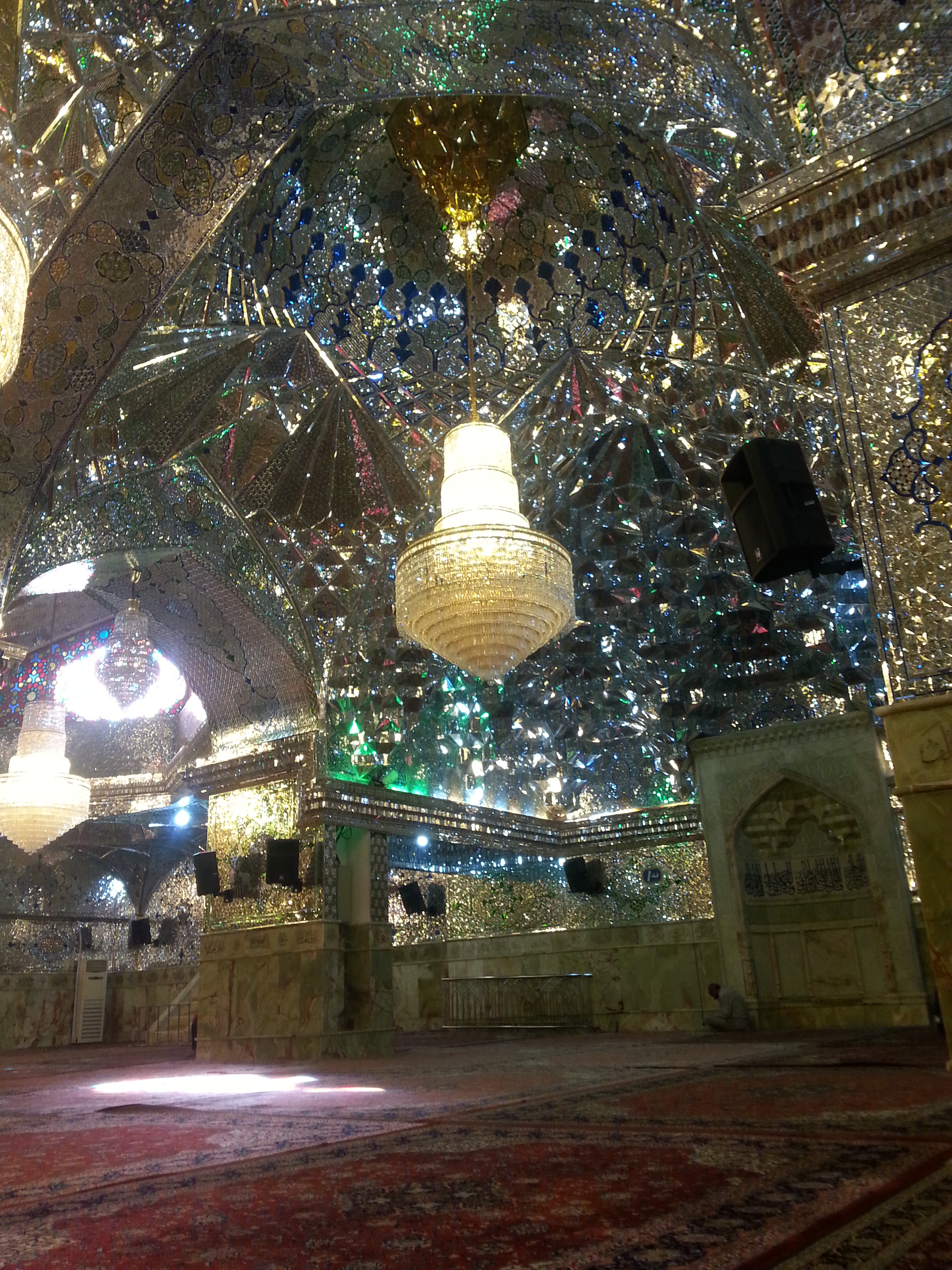
Adjoining prayer halls, under the dome, featuring Ayeneh-kari decorations

The complex consists of a mosque, the mausoleum of Sayyid Ahmad ibn Musa, and, in more recent times, a history museum. The mausoleum of Sayyid Ahmad, made of plaster and stone, is topped by a large dome. Around the grave, a silver zarih is visible. The enormous dome above the shrine is inlaid with hundreds of thousands of pieces of finely crafted ceramic tiles and the interior walls are likewise covered with myriad pieces of dazzling cut glass intermixed with multi-colored tiles. The current dome has a metal skeleton that was completed in the Qajar era. It replaced the original Safavid-era dome that was destroyed in the earthquake. Persian calligraphy lines the base of the dome.

The decorative work throughout the complex is a mosaic of mirrored glass, the inscriptions are in stucco, the doors are covered with panels of silver, and the complex is enhanced by the elegant portico and the wide sahn. The tomb, with its latticed railing, is in an alcove between the space beneath the dome and the mosque. This placement is custom practice, so that it is not directly under the dome. Other pilgrimage sites in Shiraz follow similar practice. Two short minarets are situated at each end of the columned portico.

== Museum ==
The museum located within the Shah Cheragh complex was established in 1925 in a corner of the shrine. In this museum, at least 600 pieces of pottery and clay artwork are stored, as well as several coins from the Parthian and Sasanian eras. Also inside the museum are weapons (such as swords) from the Safavid and Qajar eras. Several examples of manuscripts and documents are archived there as well.

== 2022 shooting ==
On 26 October 2022 (4 Aban 1401), an armed individual carrying a Kalashnikov rifle opened fire on pilgrims at the Shah Cheragh Shrine in Shiraz, killing 13 people and injuring more than 50 others. Hours after the attack, ISIS claimed responsibility for the attack. Three days of public mourning were declared in Shiraz. Security and law-enforcement personnel subsequently arrived at the shrine and arrested the attacker. The United Nations have condemned the attack at the religious site.

== Gallery ==
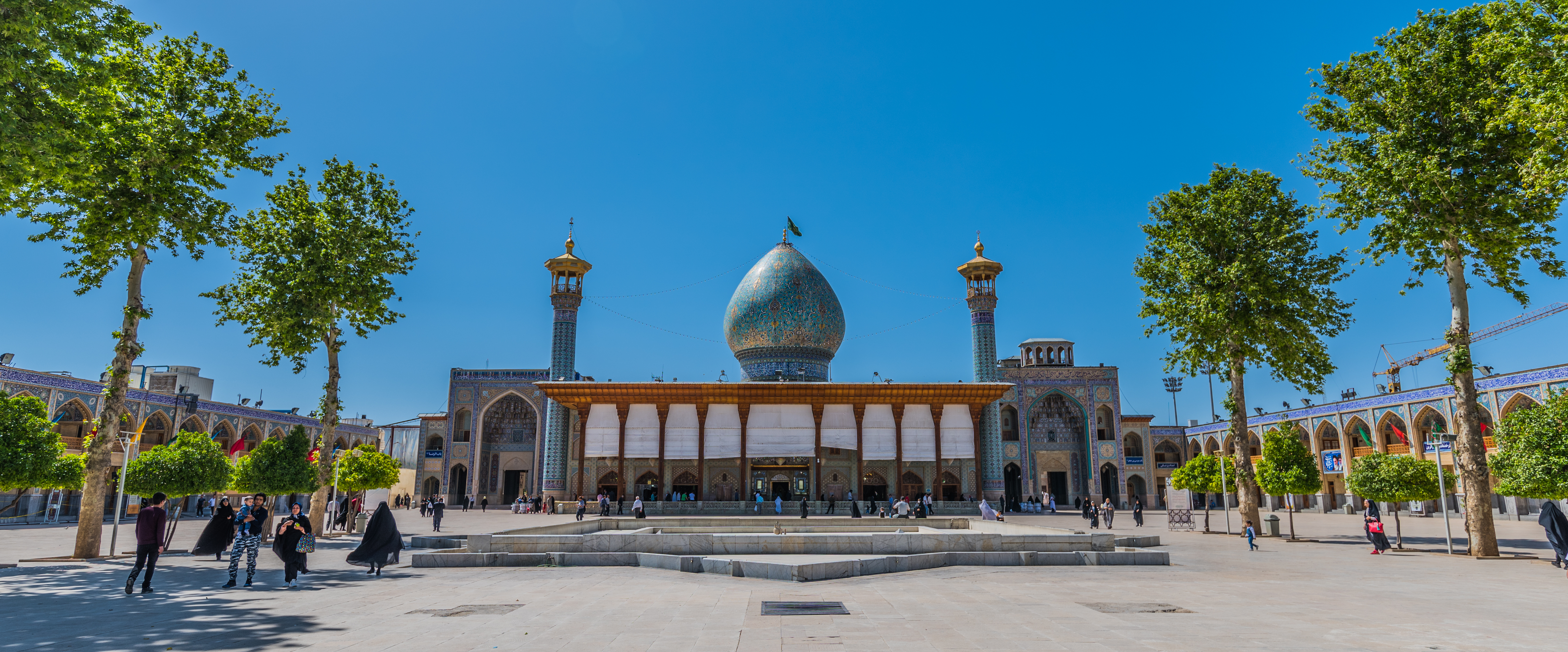

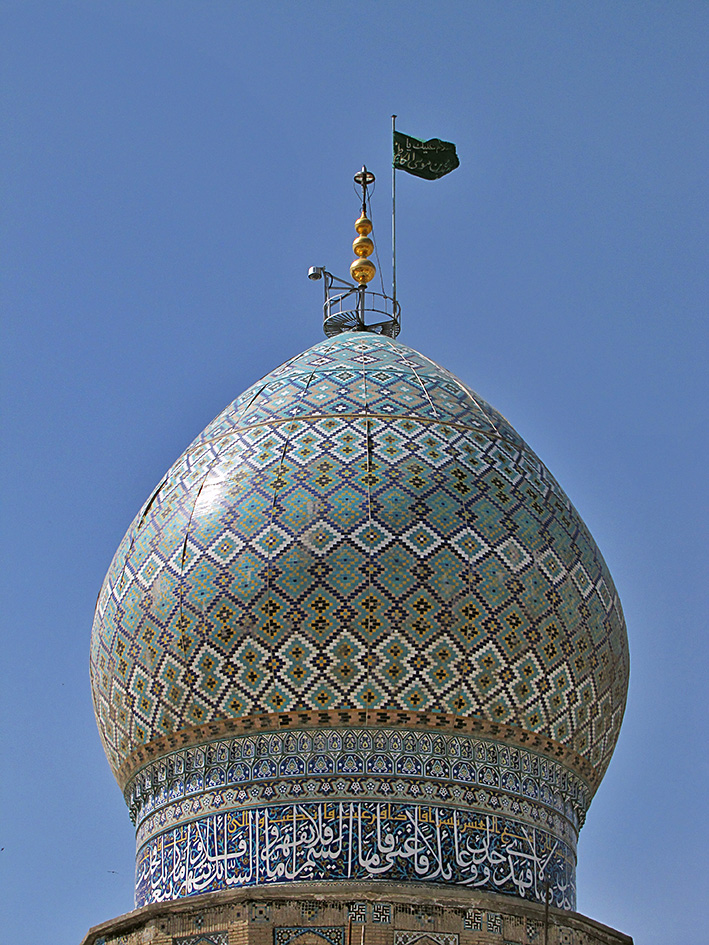

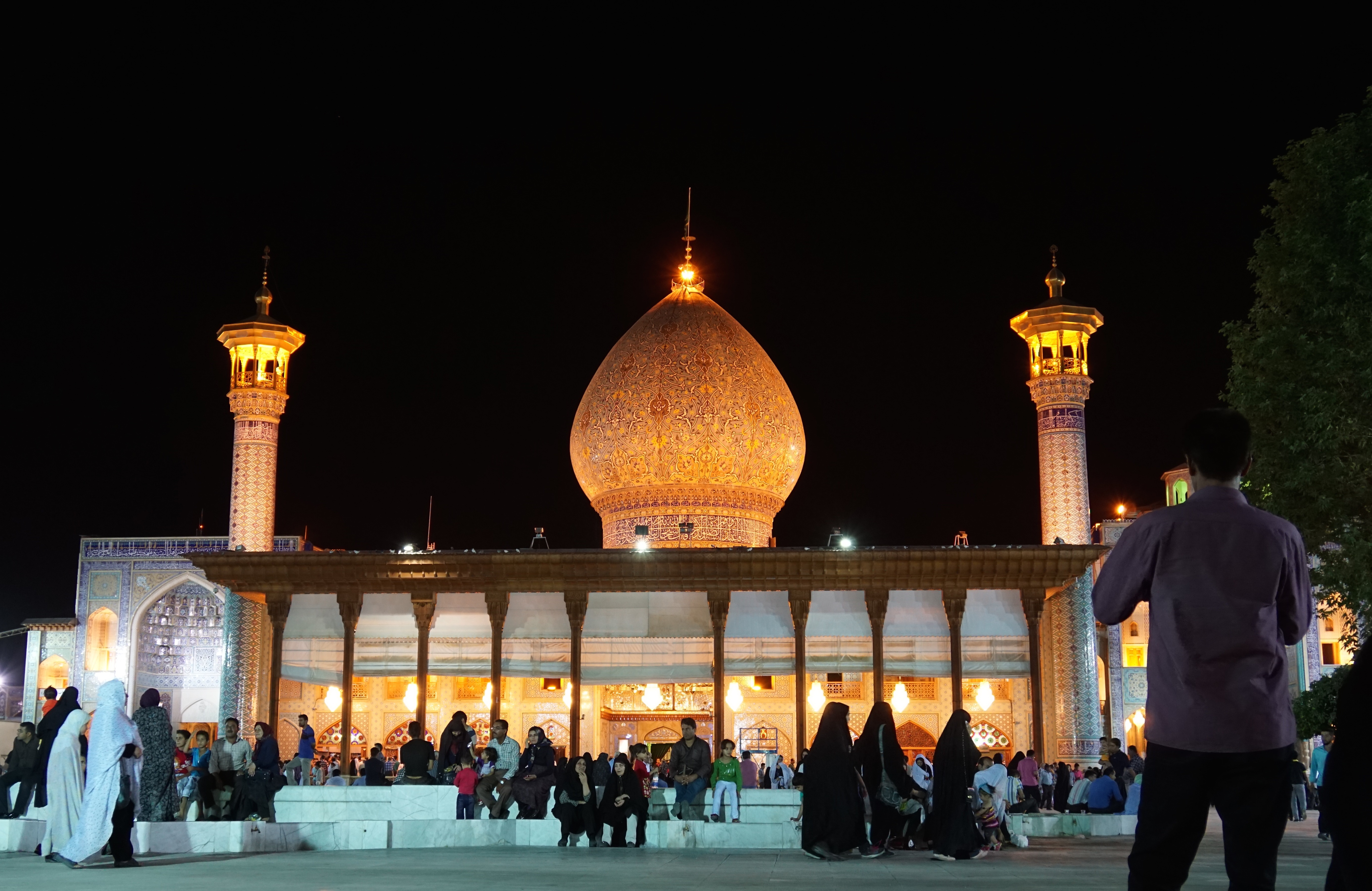

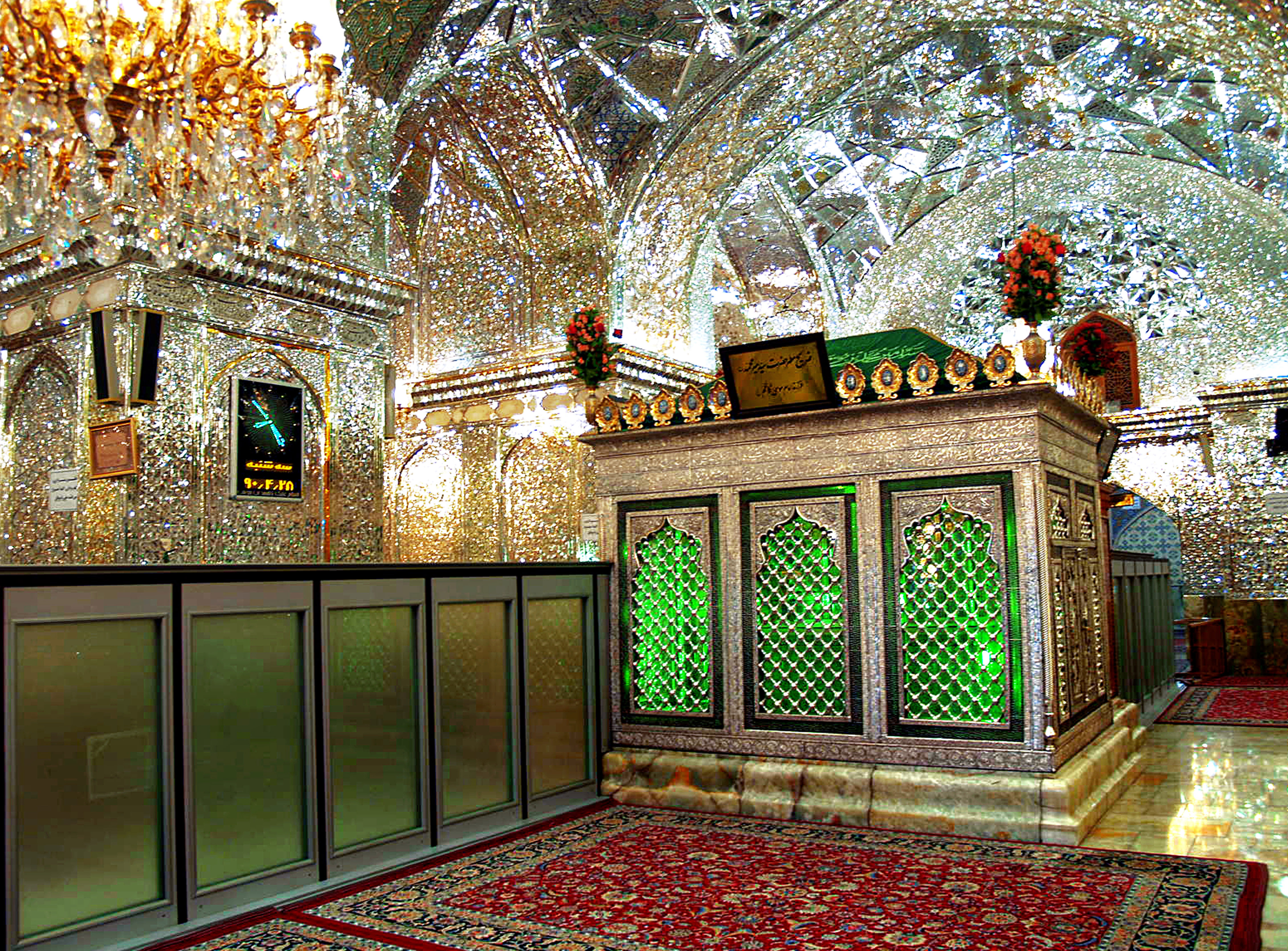

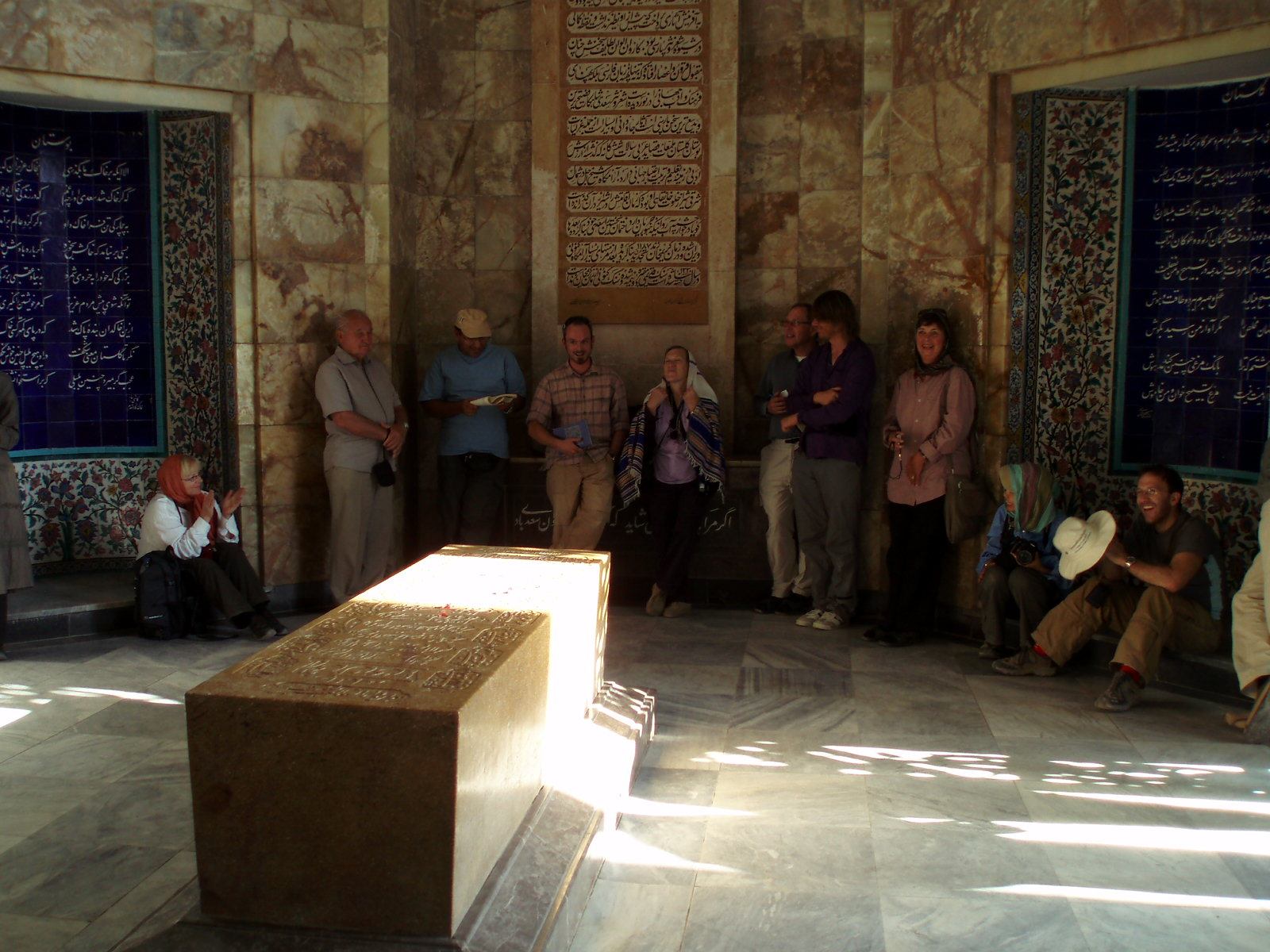

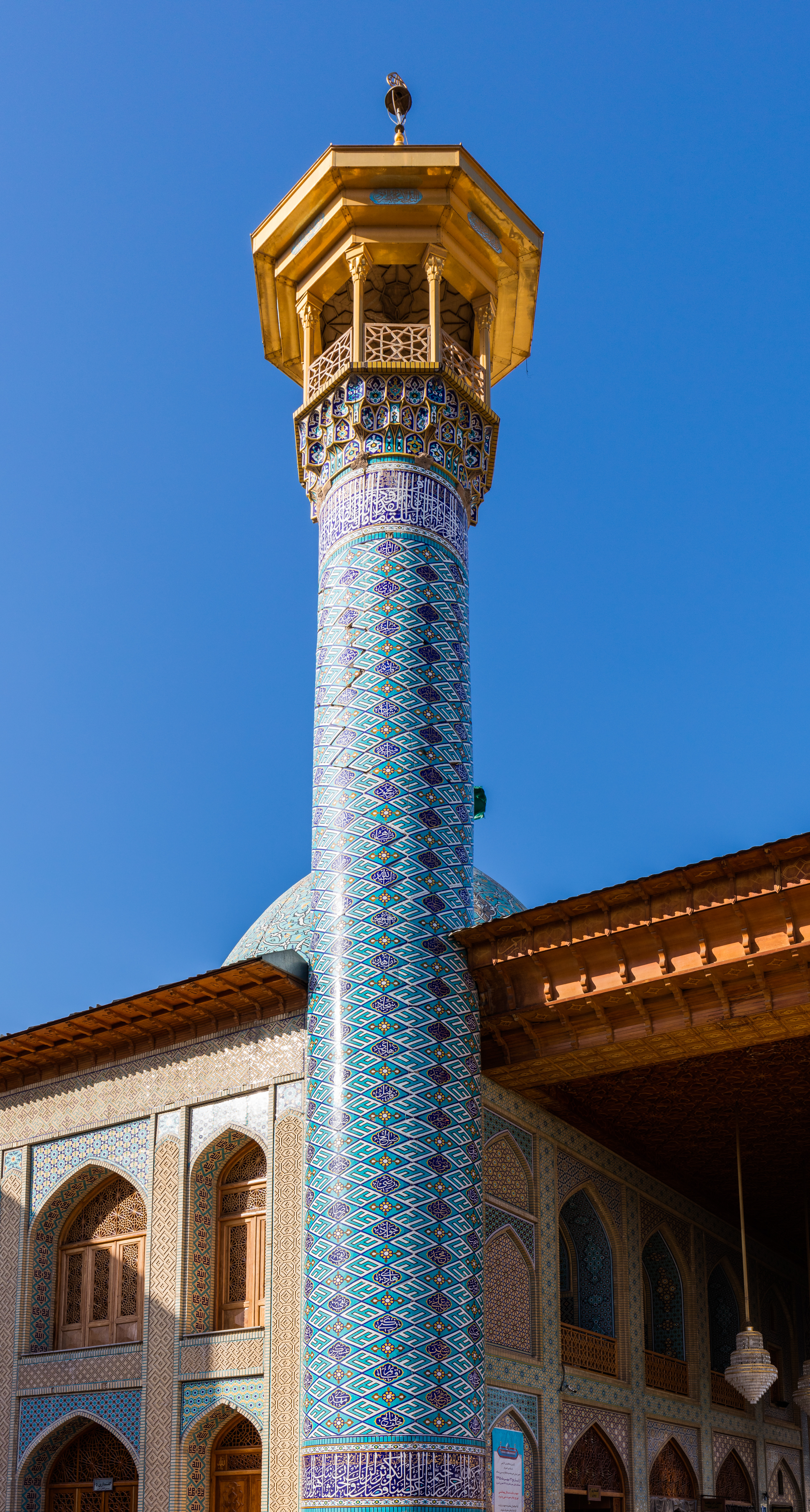

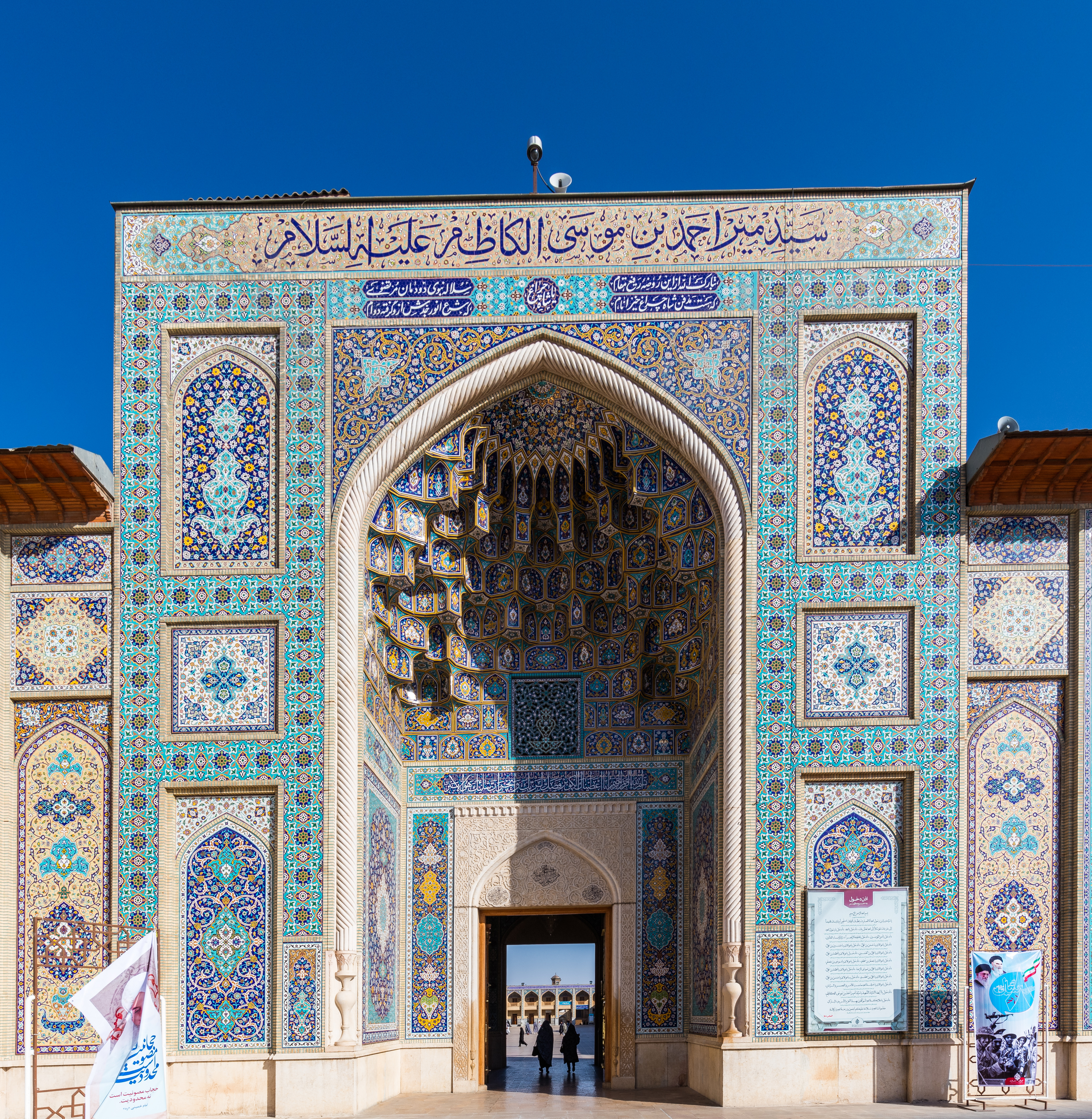

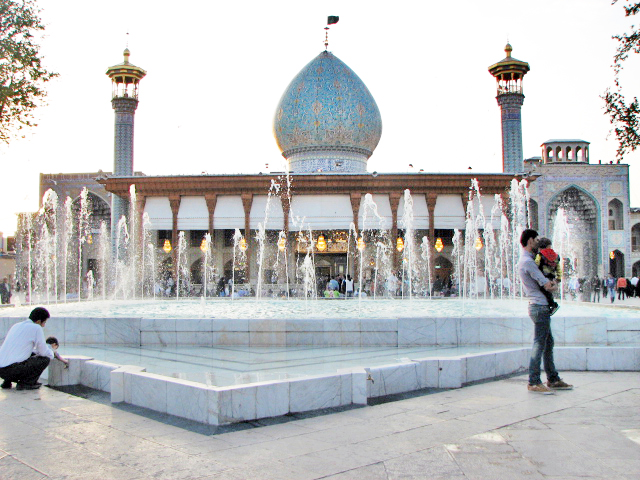

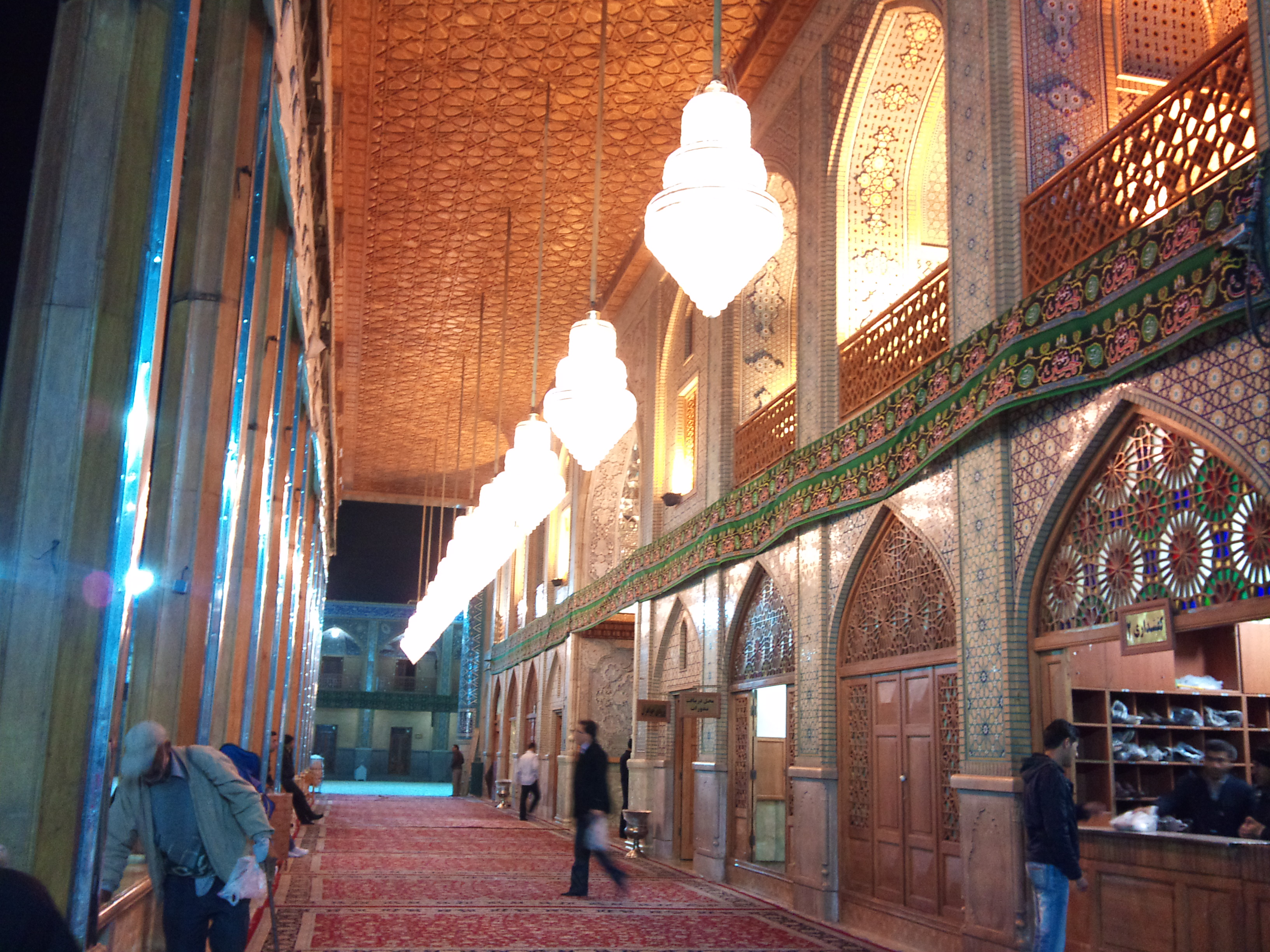

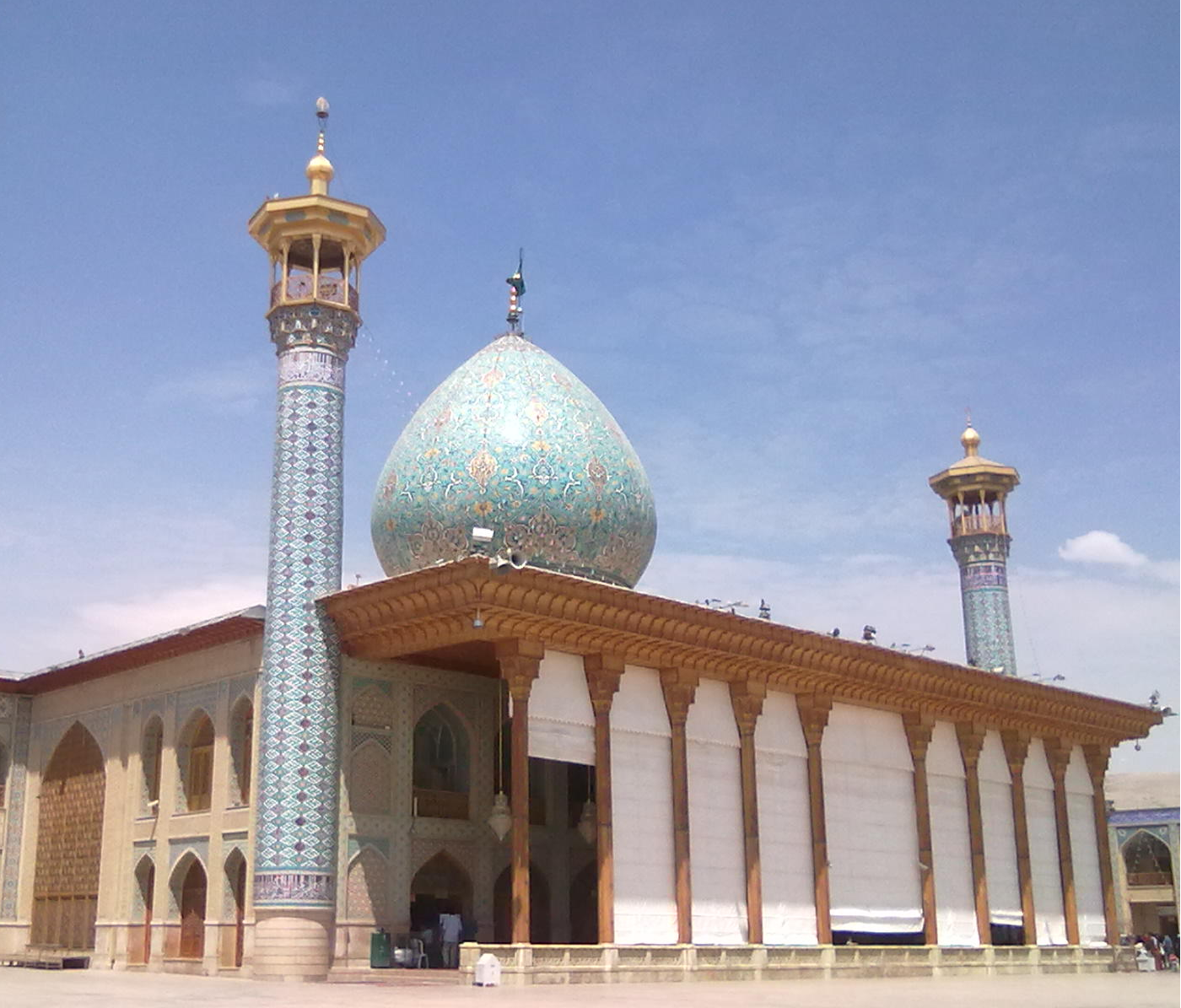

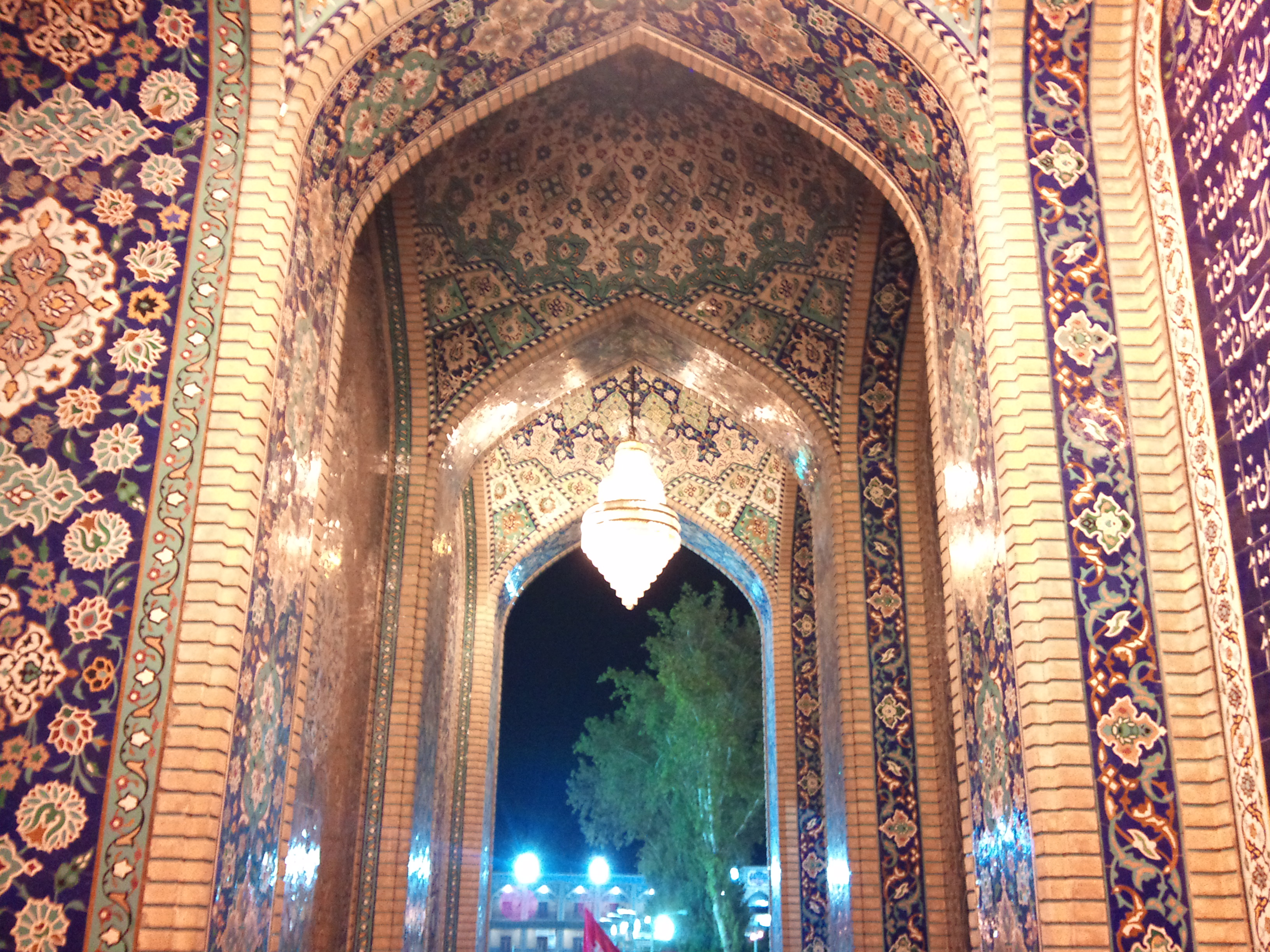

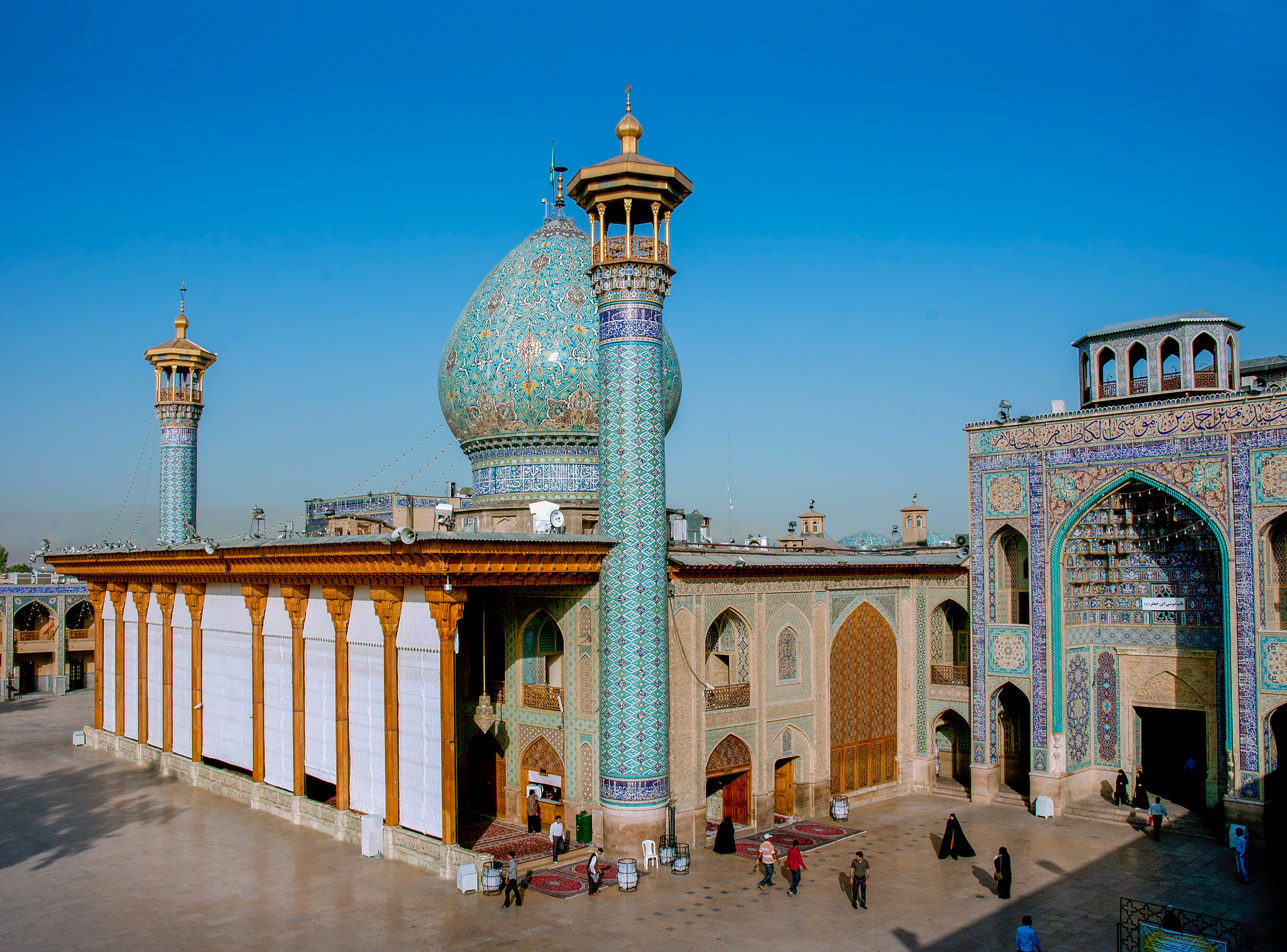

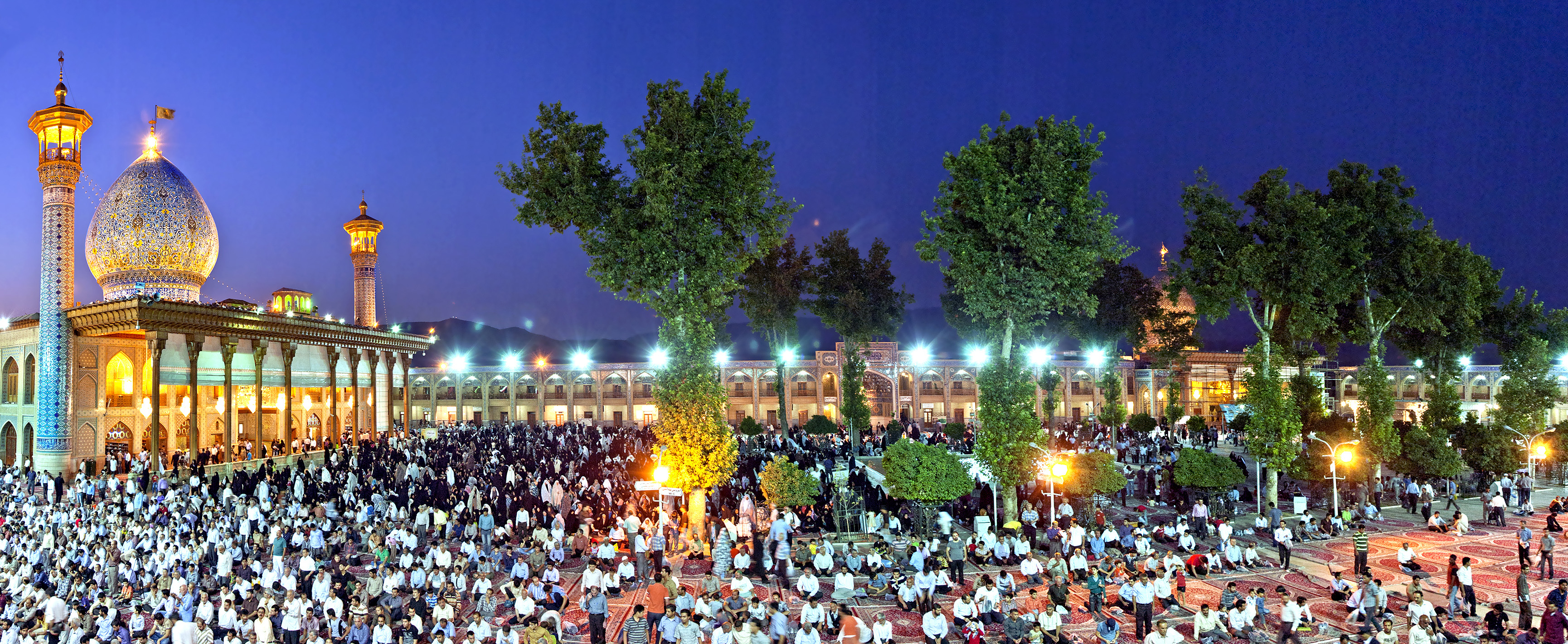

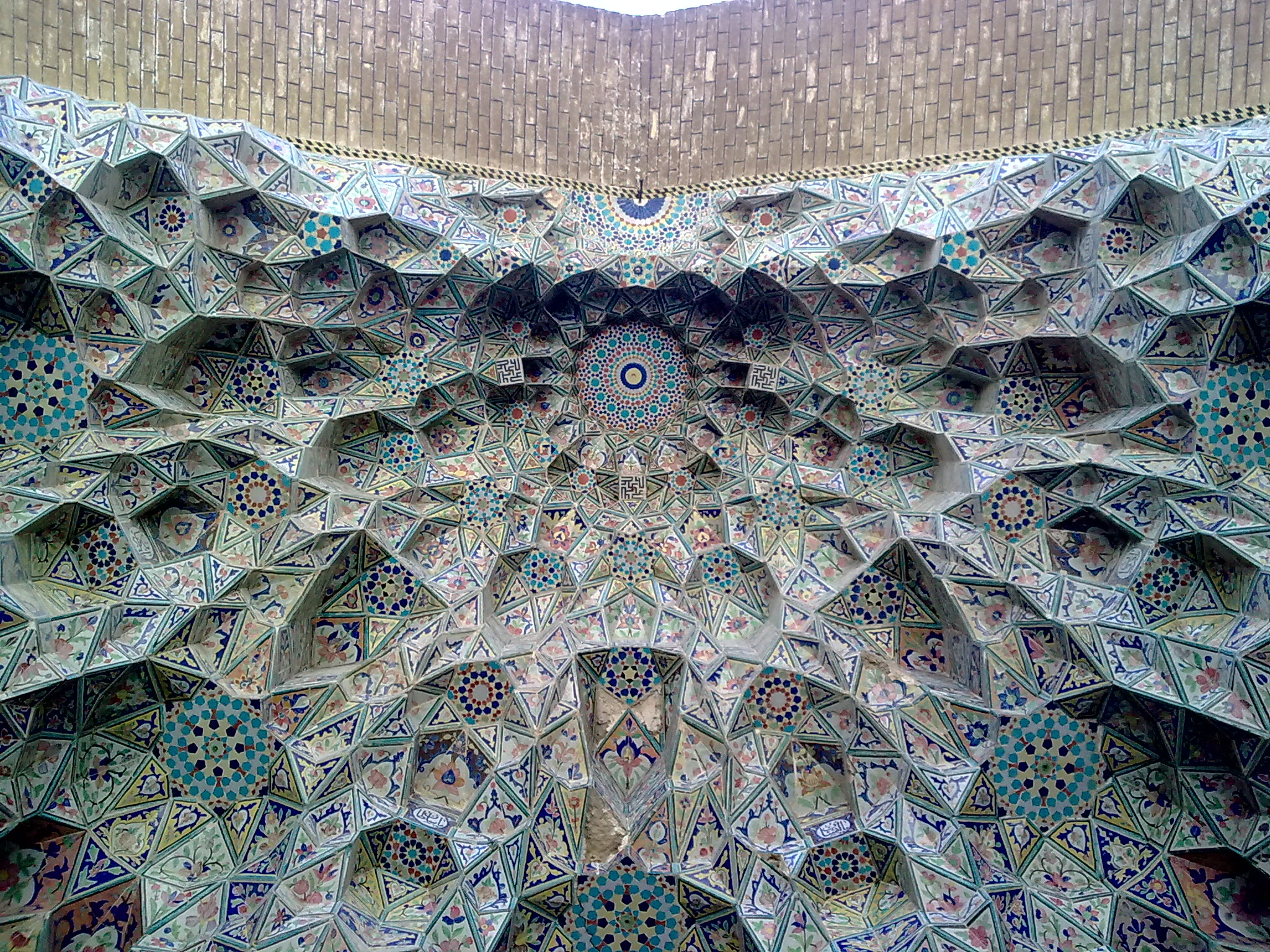

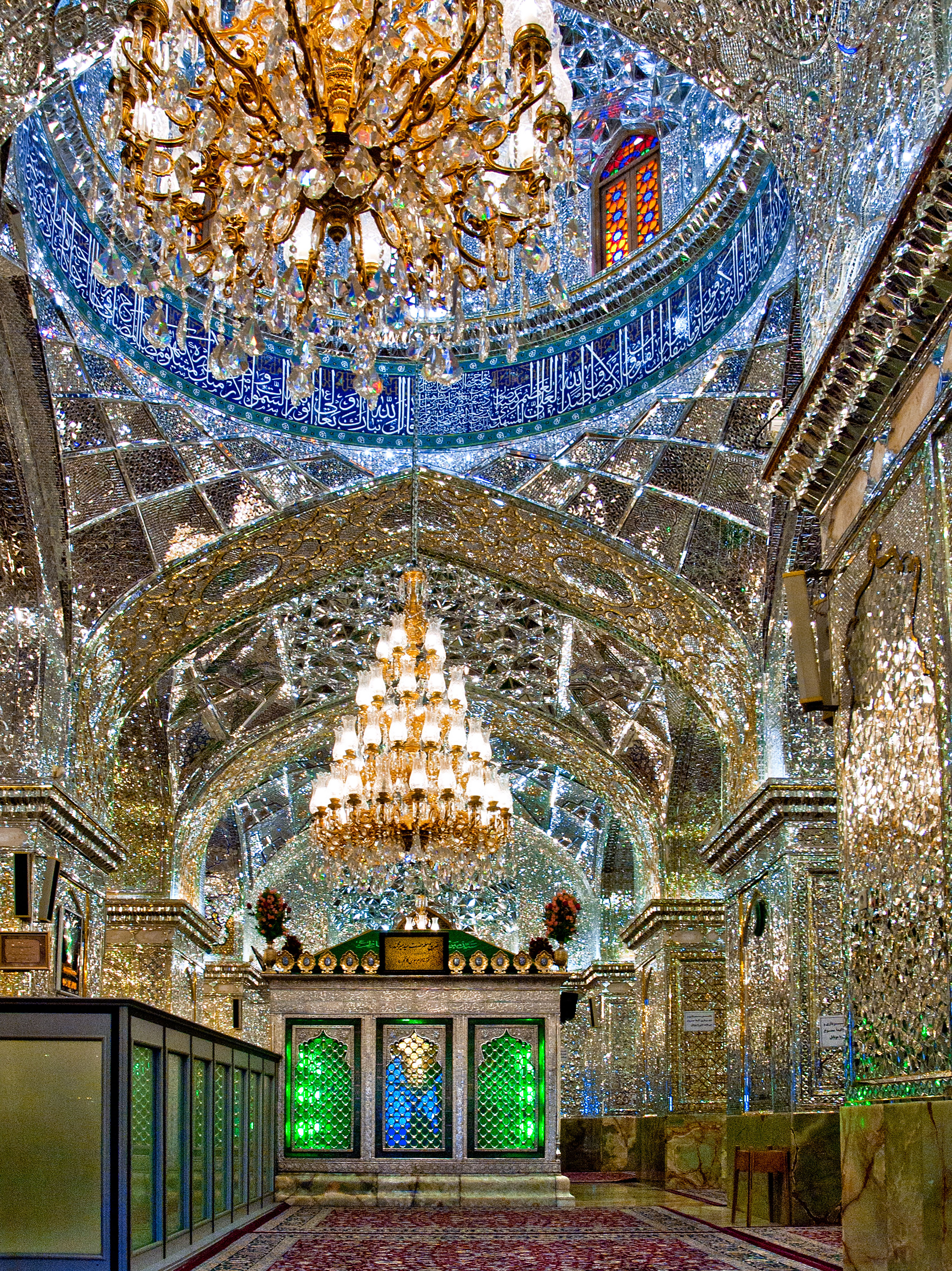

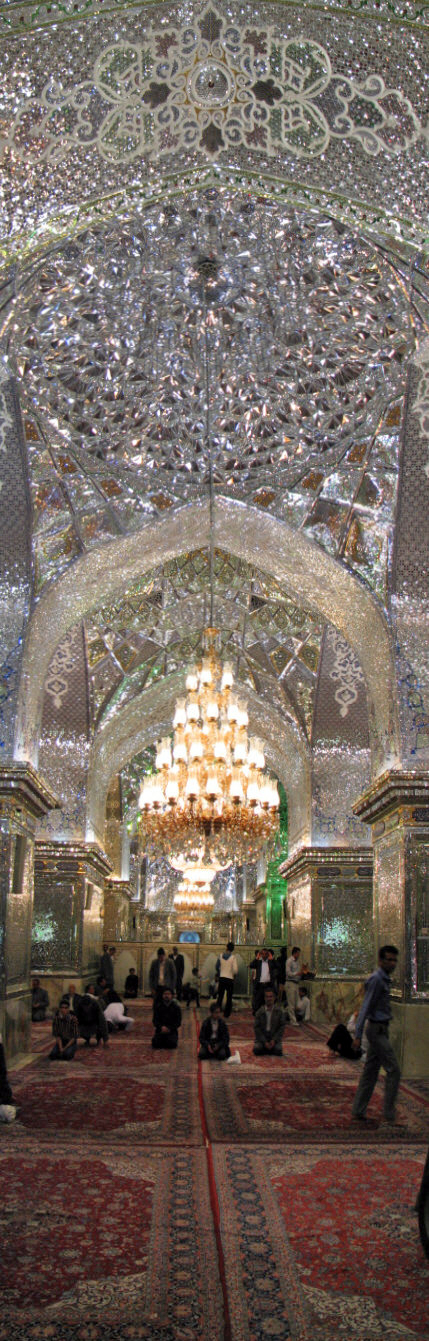

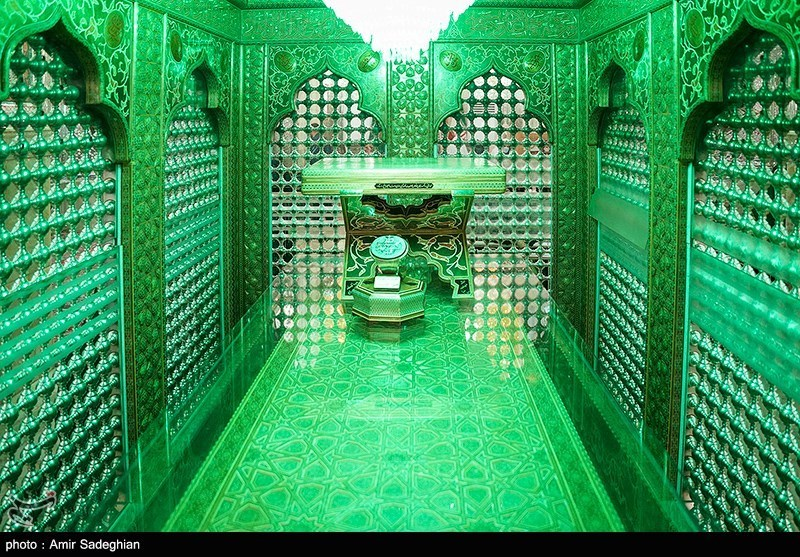

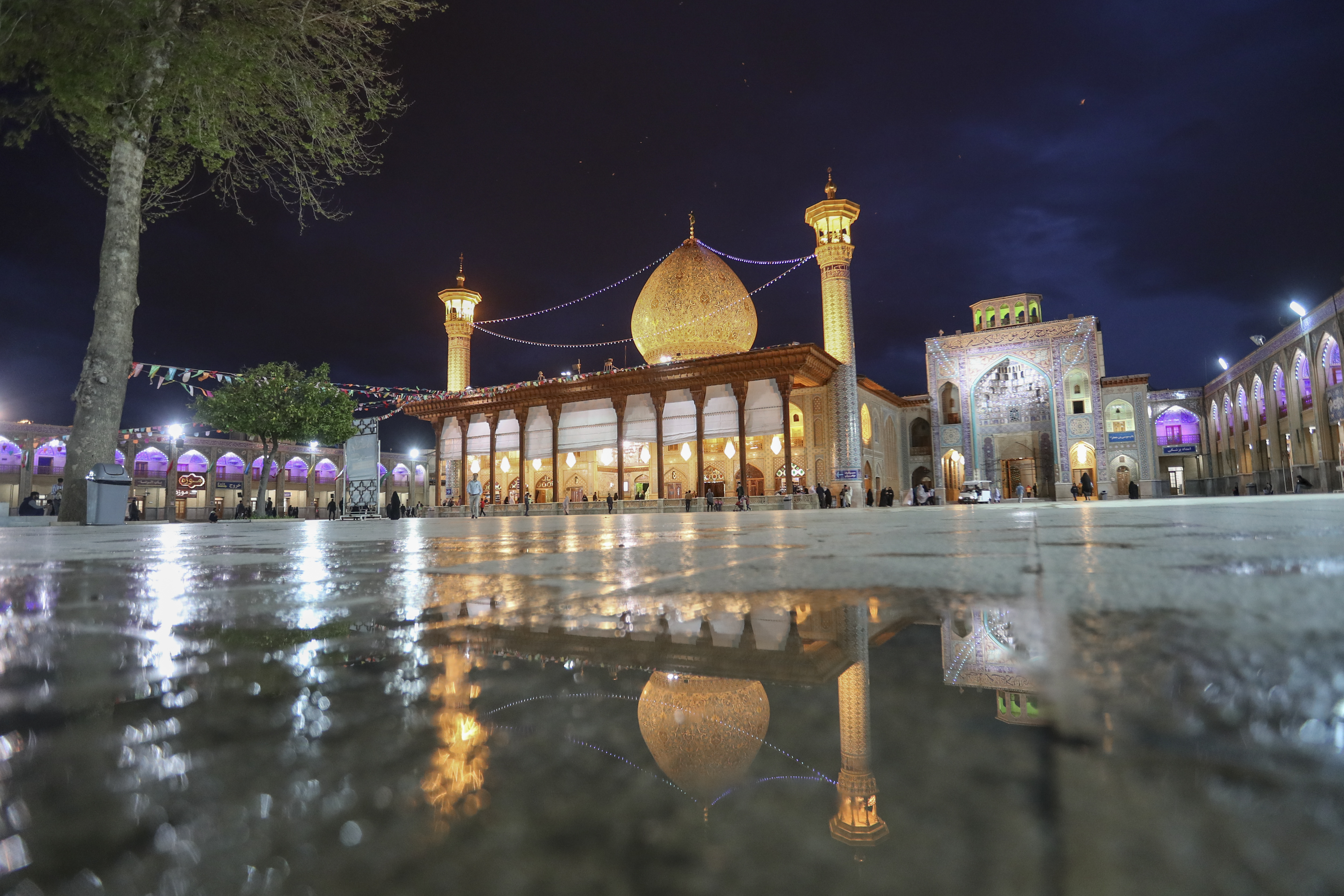

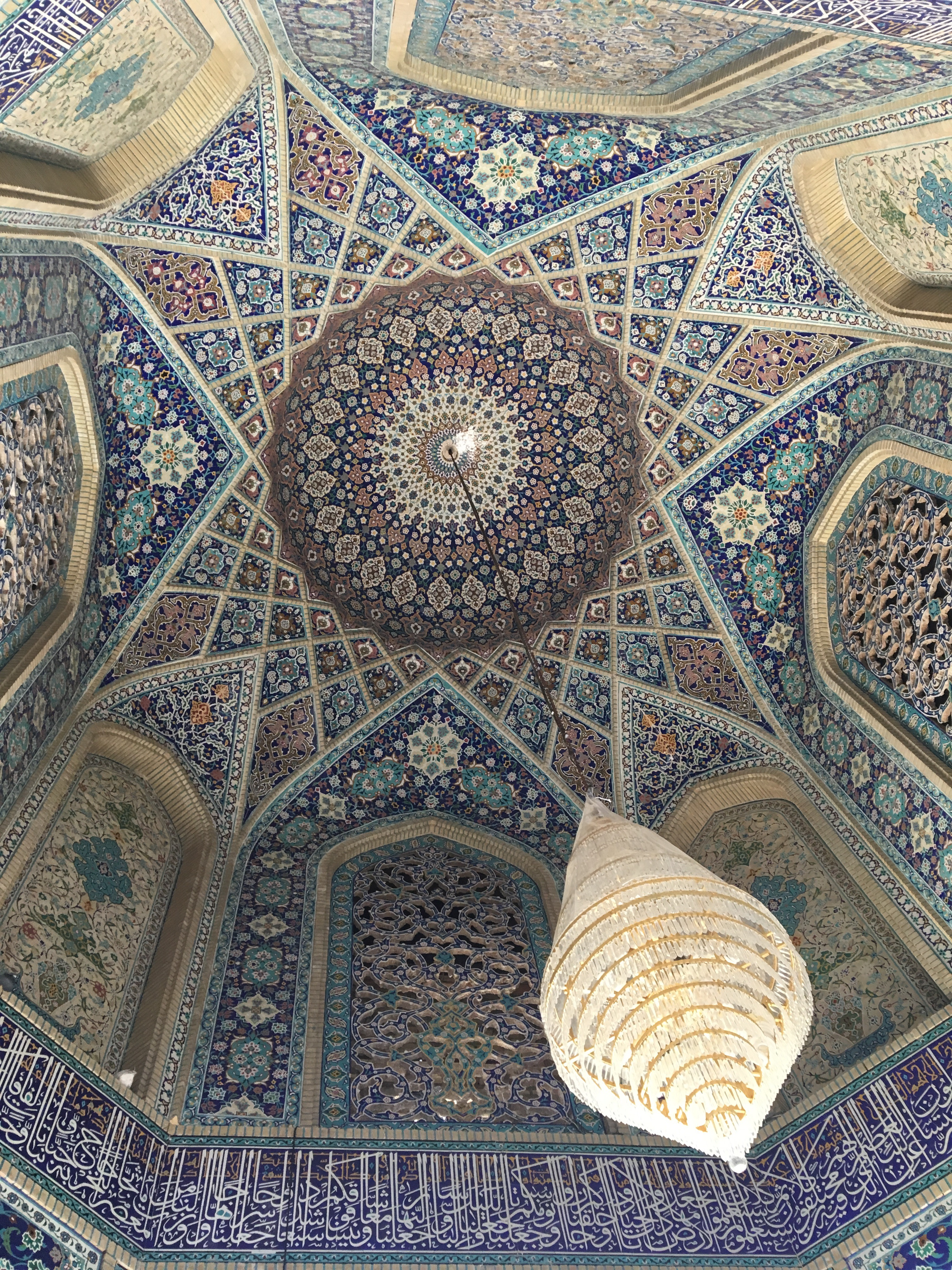

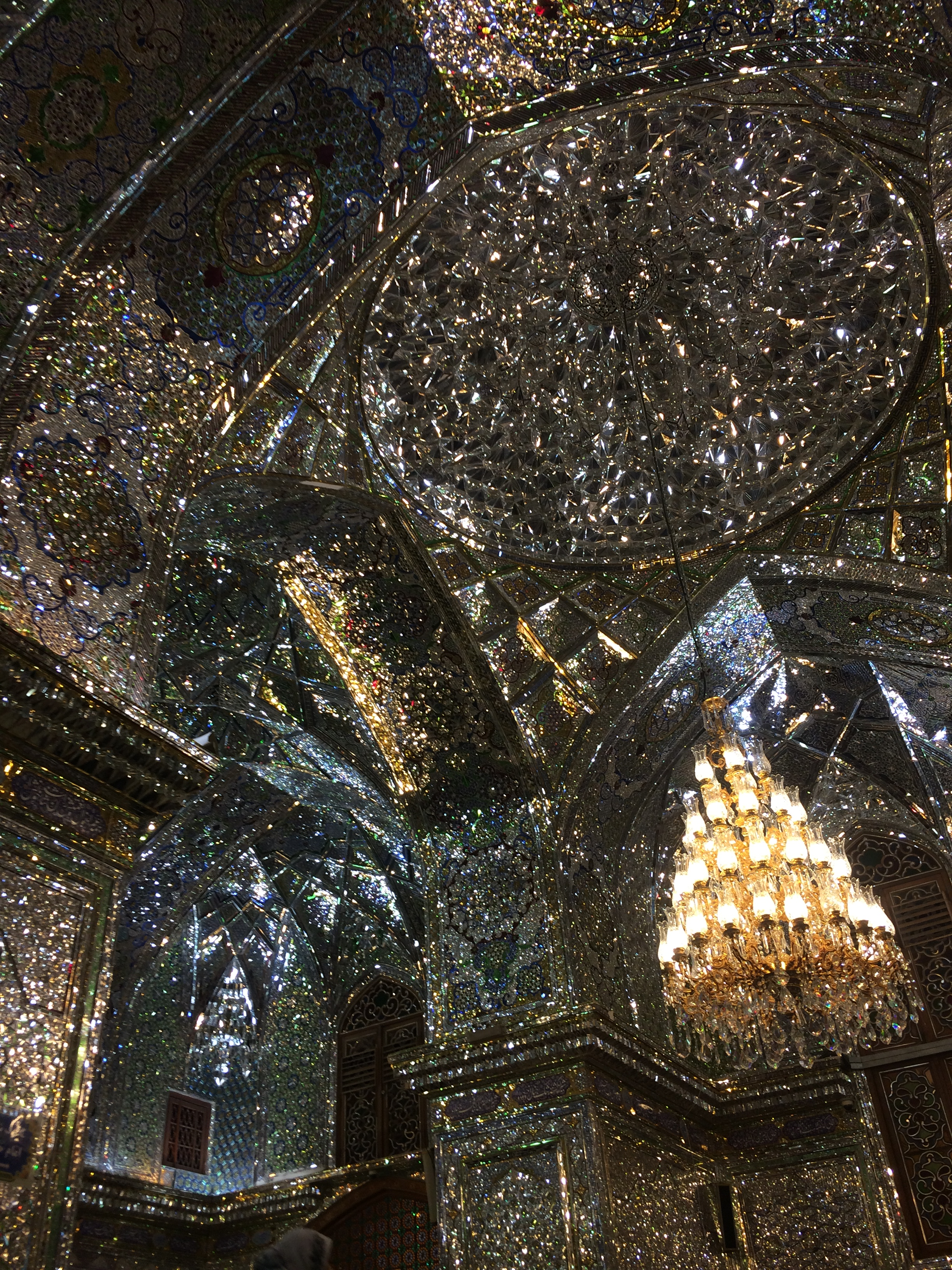

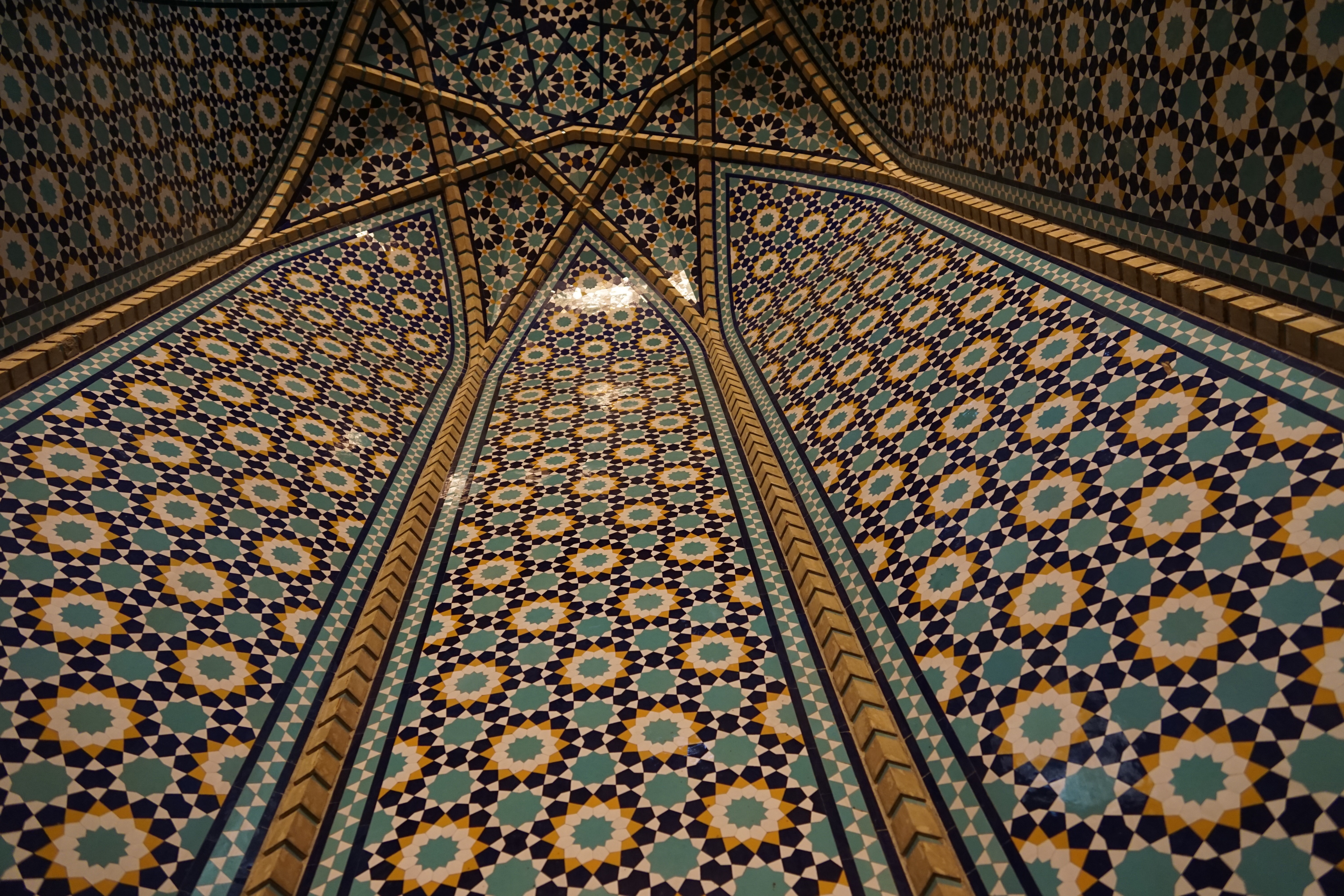

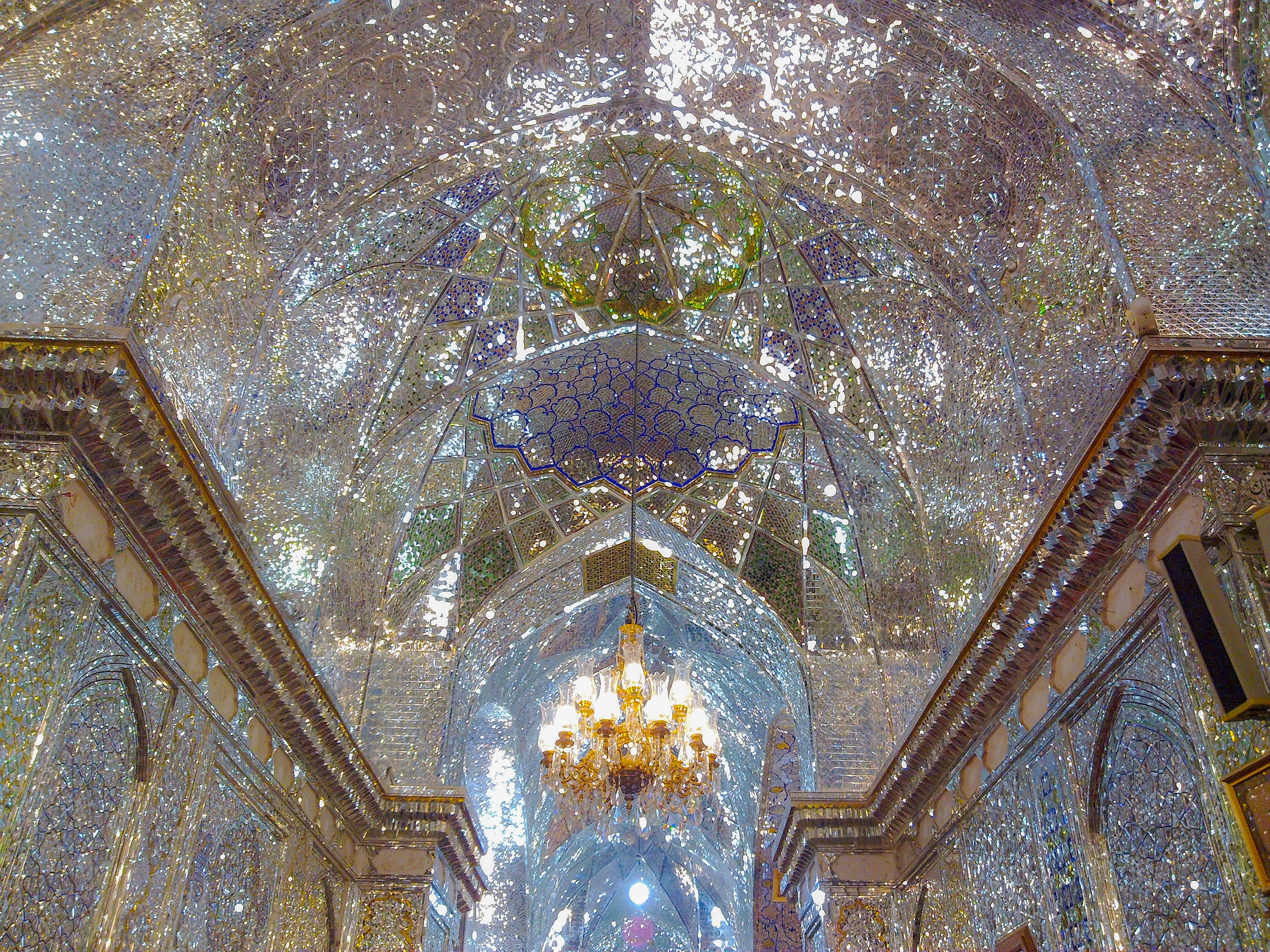

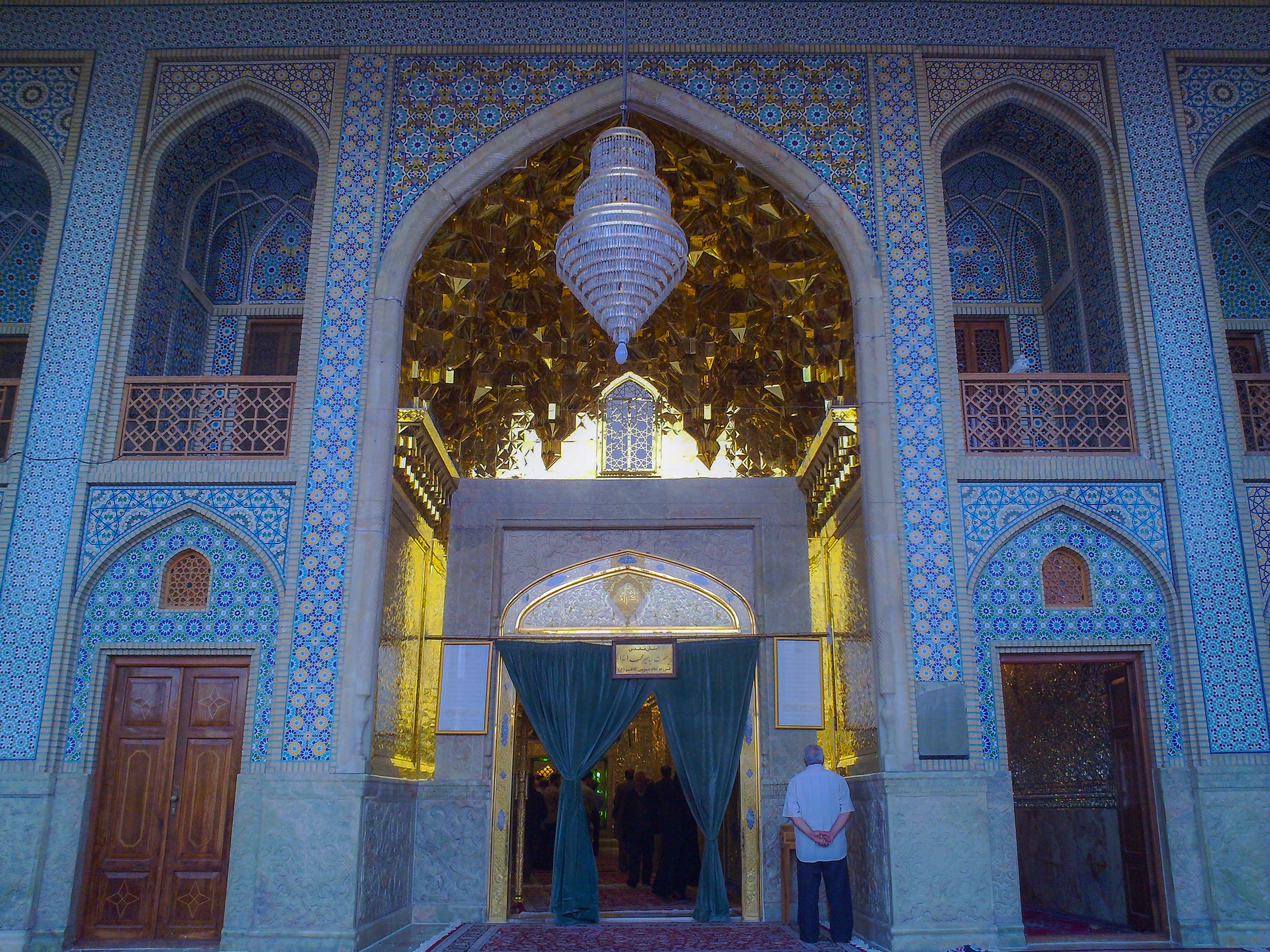

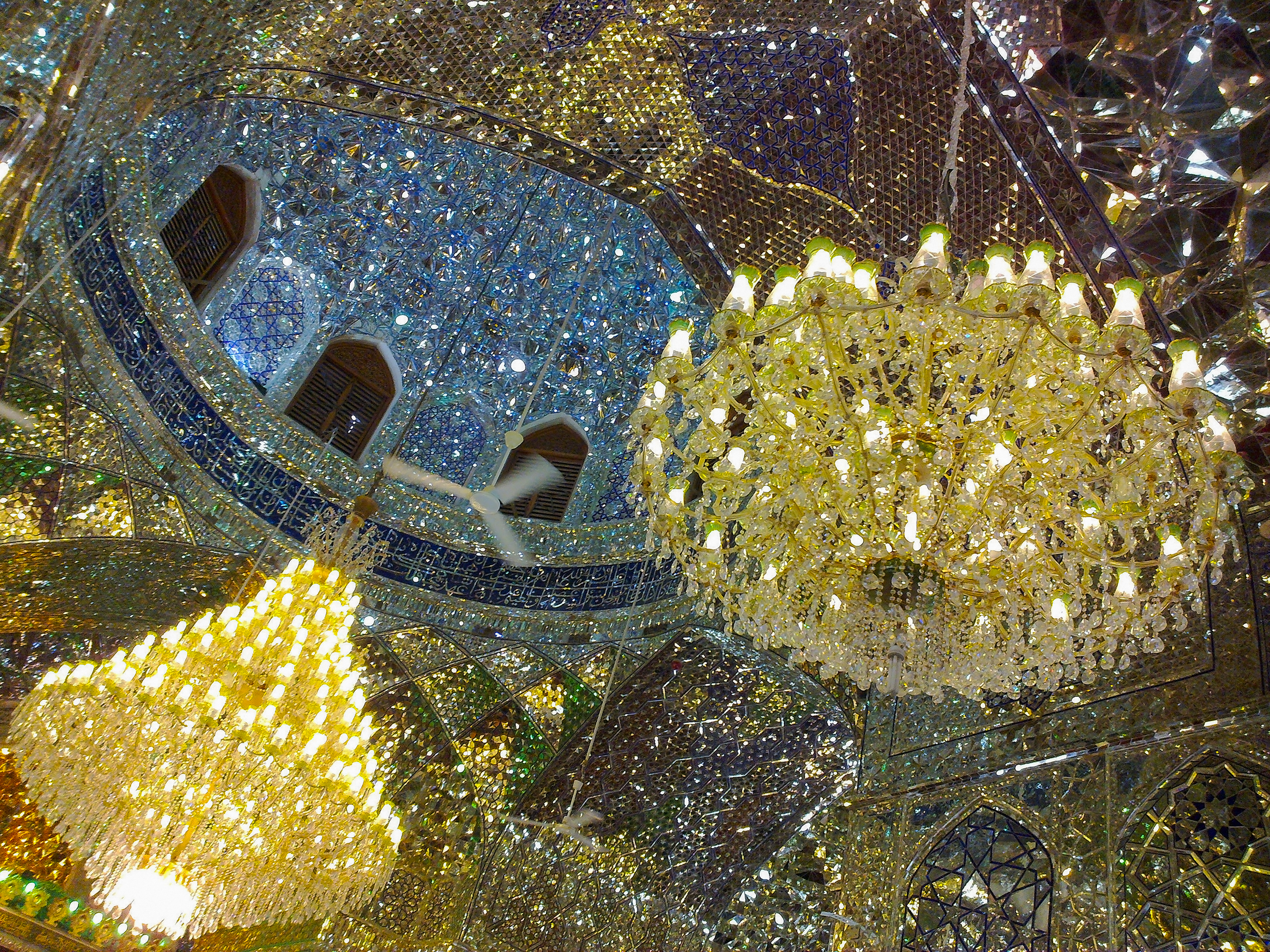

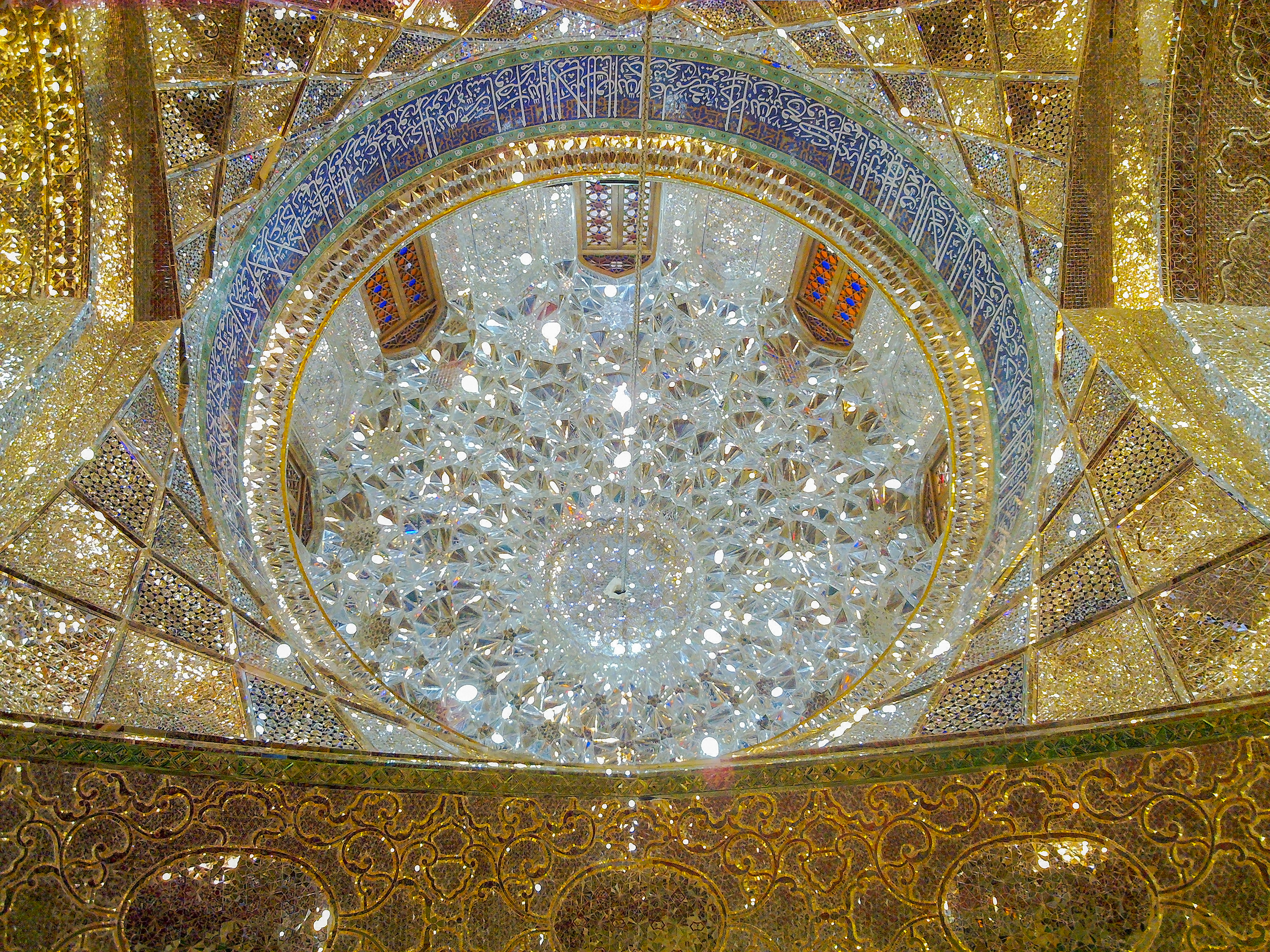

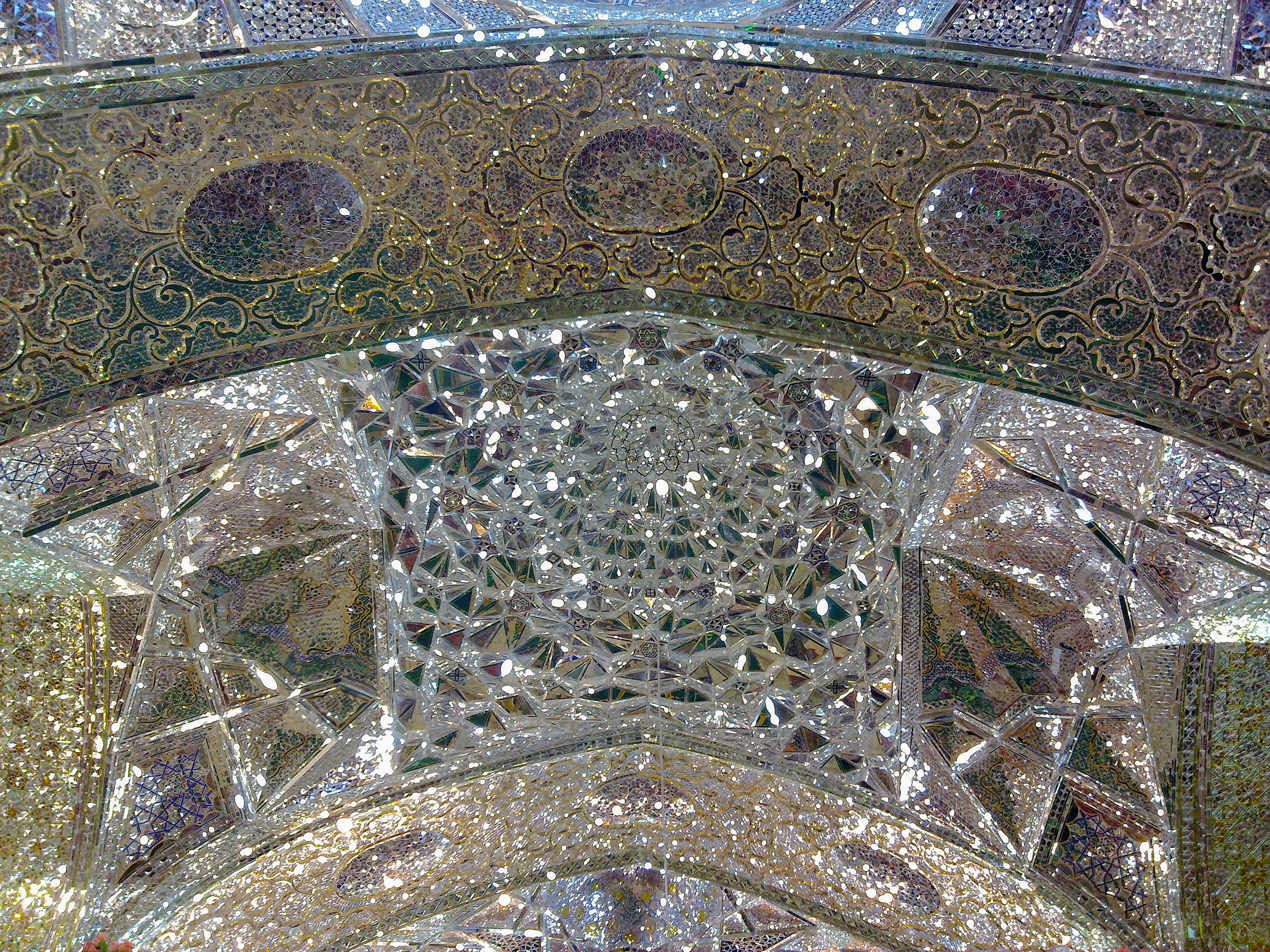

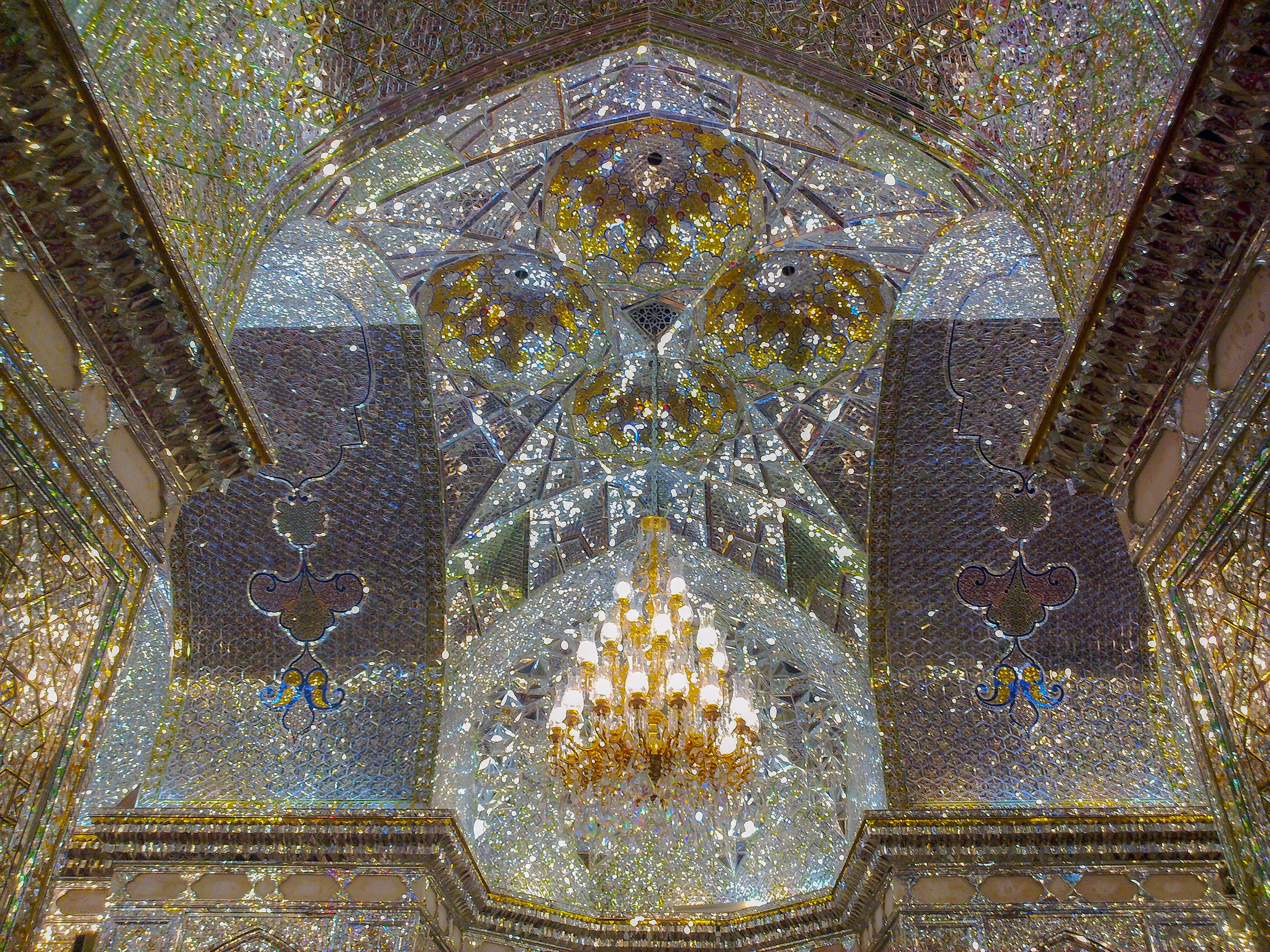

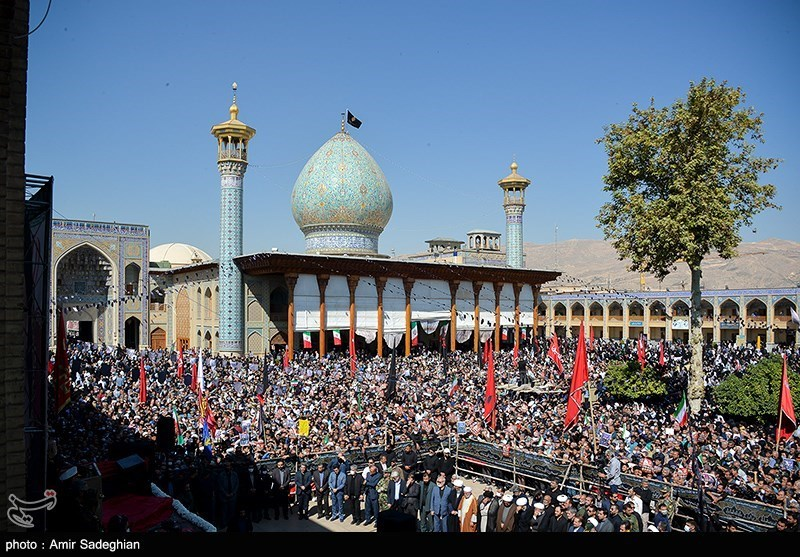

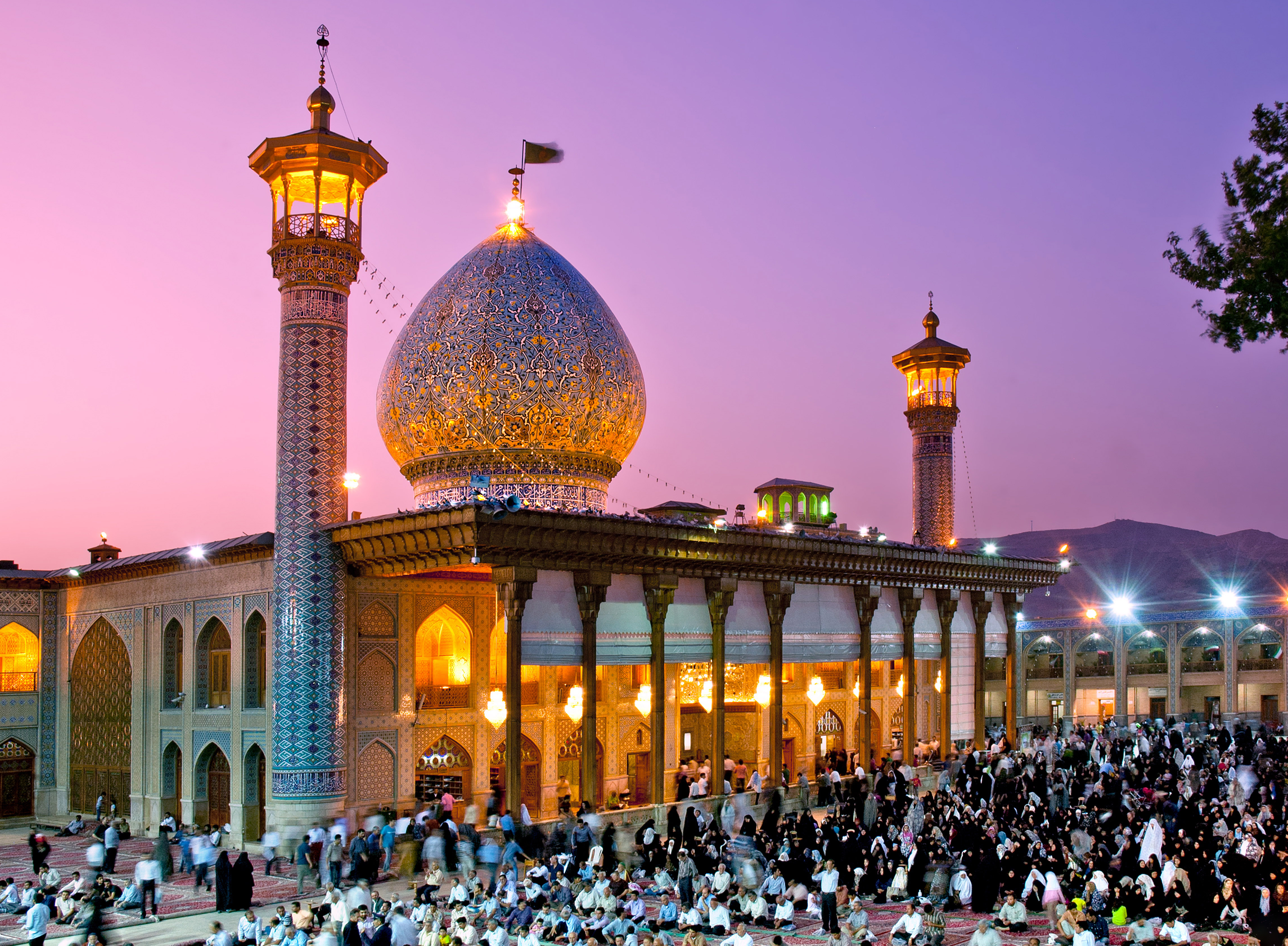

== See also ==
- Holiest sites in Shia Islam
- Shia Islam in Iran
- List of imamzadehs in Iran
- List of mausoleums in Iran
- List of mosques in Iran
