= Ancient Congregational Mosque of Shiraz =

Mosque in Shiraz, Fars, Iran

- مسجد جامع عتیق (شیراز)
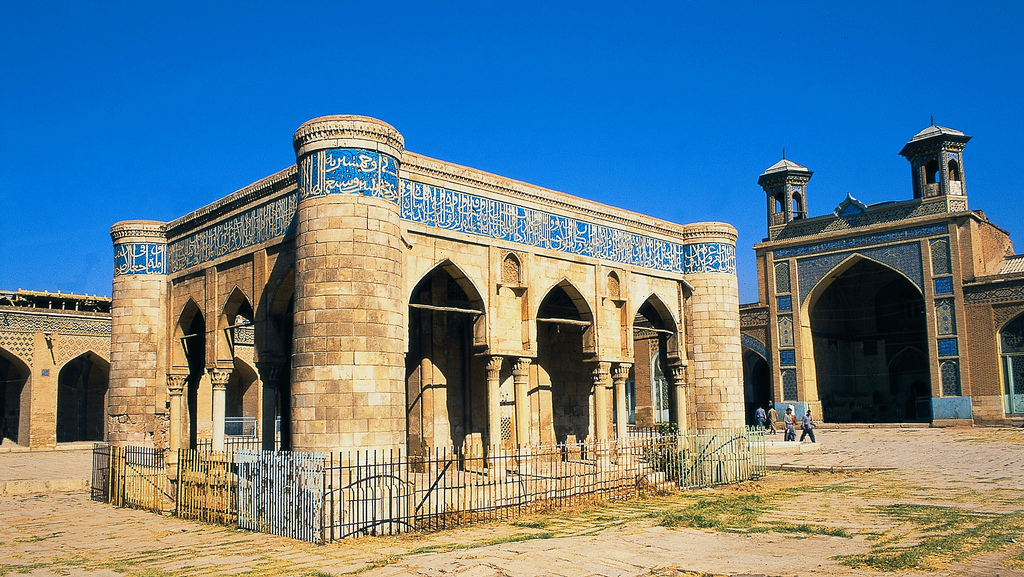
- Central "Khuda Khane" in the sahn (built in 1352), and northern iwan (17th century) of the mosque

- Location of the mosque in Iran

Religion
- Affiliation: Shia Islam
- Ecclesiastical or organisational status: Friday mosque
- Status: Active

Location
- Location: Shiraz, Fars
- Country: Iran
- Coordinates: 29°36′29″N 52°32′41″E

Architecture
- Type: Mosque architecture
- Style: Saffarid (main structure); Safavid (annex, sahn, iwan)
- Founder: Amir ibn al-Layth (AH 281)
- Completed: 281 AH (894/895 CE) (main structure); 12th century (prayer hall, dome, sahn, madrasa); 1351 CE (Khuda Khane); 17th century (annex); 20th century (renovations)

Specifications
- Dome: One
- Minaret: Two (turret-style)
- Minaret height: 25 m (82 ft)
- Materials: Stone; bricks; plaster; ceramic tiles

Iran National Heritage List
- Official name: Old Friday Mosque of Shiraz
- Type: Friday Mosque
- Designated: 1932
- Reference no.: 72
- Conservation organization: Cultural Heritage, Handicrafts and Tourism Organization of Iran

The Ancient Congregational Mosque of Shiraz (Note: Other names include: Atigh Jameh Mosque of Shiraz; Old Congregational Mosque of Shiraz; Old Friday Mosque of Shiraz; Jameh Atiq Mosque of Shiraz; Jameh Atigh Mosque of Shiraz; Masjed-e Jameh-ye Atiq; Grand Mosque of Shiraz; Old Grand Mosque of Shiraz.) (Note: (Persian: مسجد جامع عتیق (شیراز), romanized: Masjid-i Atiq)) is the oldest mosque of Shiraz, the capital of Ostane Fars in Iran. Dating from the earliest part of the 9th century Persian Renaissance following the capture of Shiraz from the Abbasid Caliphate, it was built over a pre-existing religious compound, most likely a fire temple.

Today it functions as a Shi'ite Friday mosque. The 9th-century mosque is the oldest mosque in Shiraz, and was built in celebration of the reconquest of Shiraz from the Abbasids by Amr-e Laith Saffari of the Saffarid dynasty in 276 AH (889/890 CE) and was completed in 281 AH (894/895 CE). The mosque has been restored many times; and most of the present-day structure – a four-iwan courtyard mosque – dates from the 17th century.

In the center of the mosque's sahn is the Khuda Khane (lit. 'House of God'). (Note: Other names include: House of God (Shiraz); Khodakhaneh; Khoda Khaneh; Khoda-ye Khaneh; Khodaye Khaneh; Khoda-ye Khane; Khodaye Khane; Bayt al-Mashaf; House of Qurans (Shiraz); House of Qur'ans (Shiraz); House of Books (Shiraz).) Commissioned by Inju'id ruler Mahmud Shah (1325-1336) in 1351 for the storage of Qur'ans, this small kiosk is also known as Bayt al-Mashaf (lit. 'House of Qur'ans' or 'House of Books'). Both the mosque and Khuda Khane are aligned with qibla slightly east of south.

== Overview ==
The Atigh Jameh Mosque is located to the east of Shah Cheragh Shrine. Its various nocturnal areas (Shabestans) feature beautiful tile works on their ceilings. In the southern part of this mosque, there is a wall called “Nodbeh” which features a colourful depiction of a cedar. It is believed that on the night of Miraj, Buraq passed from this wall. The north gate, known as the "Imam Gate", is decorated with Muqarnas tiles.

The main structure was completed in the 9th century. In the 11th century, two iwans were added; and during the 12th century, the main prayer hall, dome, sahn, and madrasa were completed. The southern and western iwans and arcades were added during the 17th century; and major renovations and expansions were finalised in the latter part of the 18th and early 20th centuries.

The mosque, including "Khuda Khane", was added to the Iran National Heritage List on 6 January 1932, administered by the Cultural Heritage, Handicrafts and Tourism Organization of Iran.

== Architecture ==
Construction of the Friday Mosque of Shiraz was completed in 895 CE during the reign of Saffarid ruler, Amir ibn al-Layth (878-900 CE). It was rebuilt, restored, and expanded various times thereafter, including substantive modifications, predominately during the 17th century. Damaged by numerous earthquakes, it was repaired and restored extensively after 1935.

=== Khuda Khane ===
The kiosk known as Khuda Khane consists of a rectangular core, with a loggia of three arched bays on each side, with solid circular towers projecting at the outer corners. The date of construction 752 AH (1351/1352 CE) is seen on the southeast tower. The ensemble is raised on a marble platform. Of the original structure, only the towers, the platform and the ruined inner walls remained, as of the early twentieth century. It was rebuilt between 1937 and 1954 by the Archaeological Service of Iran based on the original design.

Elongated on the north-south axis, the rectangular core of the Khuda Khane contains a square hall with four central doorways, and a small vestibule to its north housing a spiral staircase for roof access. The four doorways on its exterior – three for the square hall and one leading into the vestibule – are flanked by engaged columns and topped with flat muqarnas crowns.

The core, which measures approximately 5.5 by 7 metres (18 by 23 ft), is enveloped by 2-metre-wide (6.6 ft) loggias to the east, west and north. The southern loggia, which faces the mosque sanctuary, is 3.5 metres (11 ft) wide. The twelve pointed arches of the veranda are carried on marble columns with bulbous bases and muqarnas capitals and square columns built into the corner towers. The arches of the east and west loggias are slightly wider; they are separated with rectangular panels resting on two pairs of columns at the center. A muqarnas cornice wraps around the loggia arcades and the corner towers below the flat roof.

The Khuda Khane is built of rubble masonry and clad entirely with alternating square and rectangular panels of cut stone. It is adorned with a wide tile band below the muqarnas cornice containing a white Thuluth inscription on a blue background with floral arabesques. The sides of the base platform are carved in relief with floral medallions.

== Gallery ==
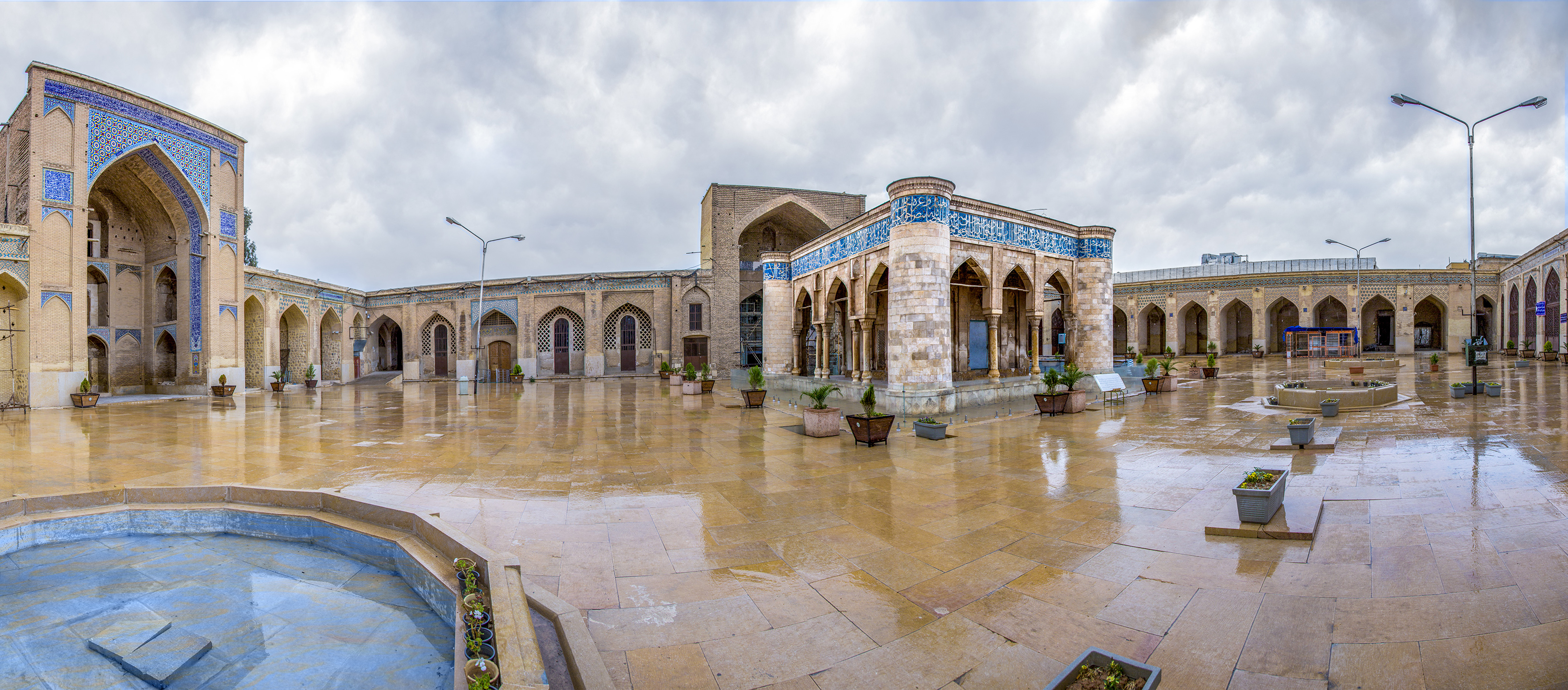
Panoramic image of the mosque exterior

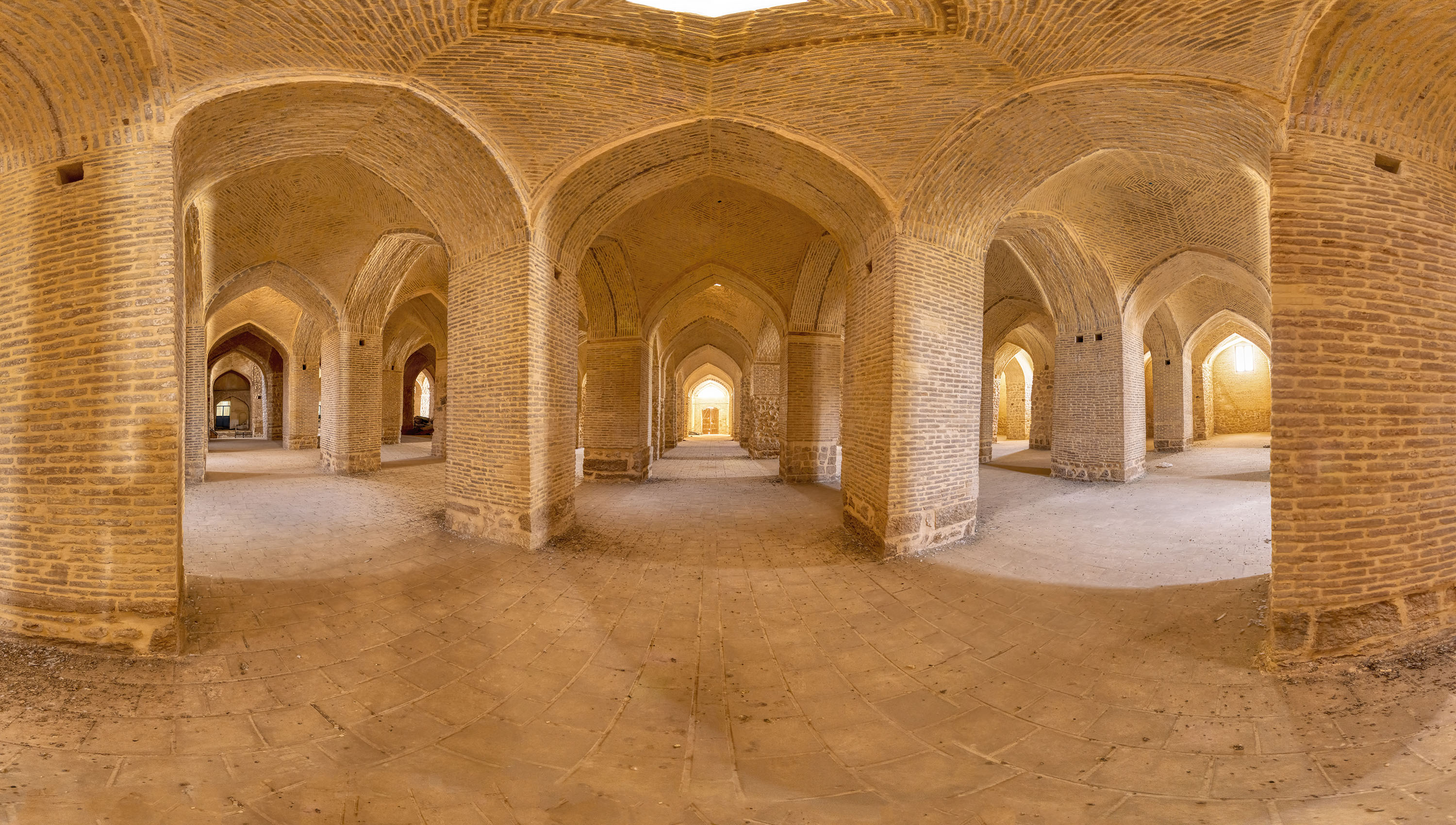
Panoramic image of the mosque interior

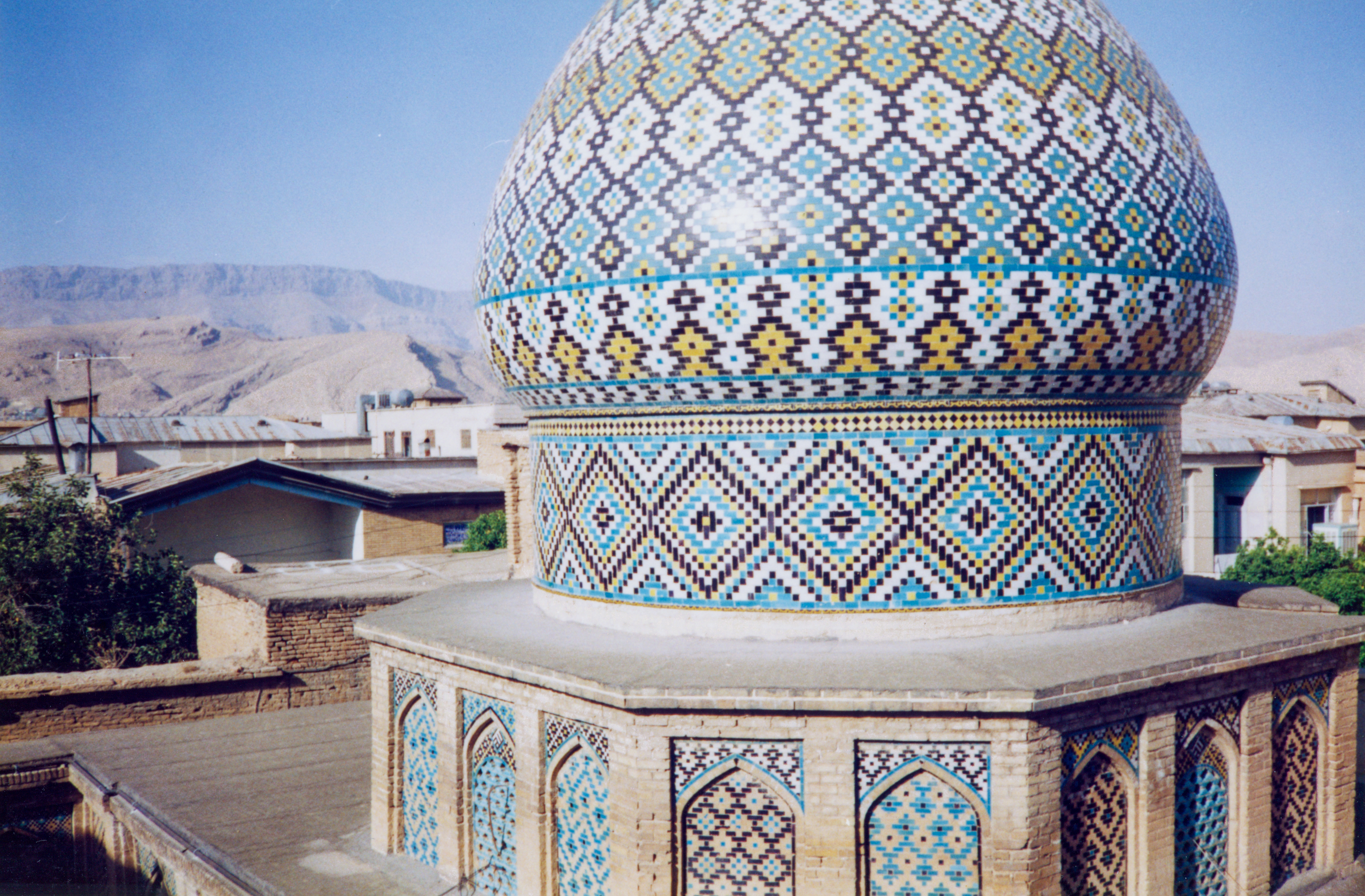
The mosque dome

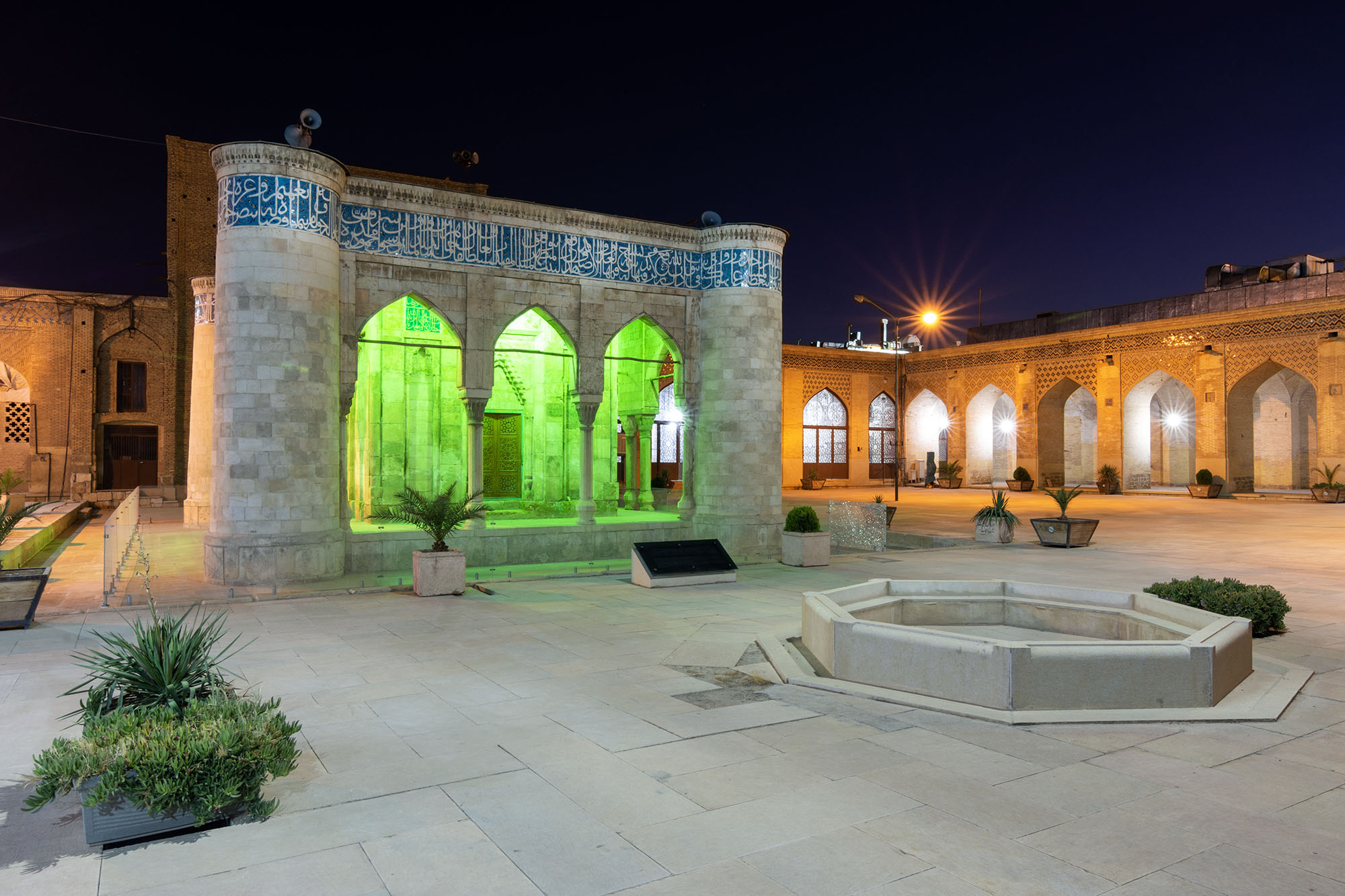
The mosque at night

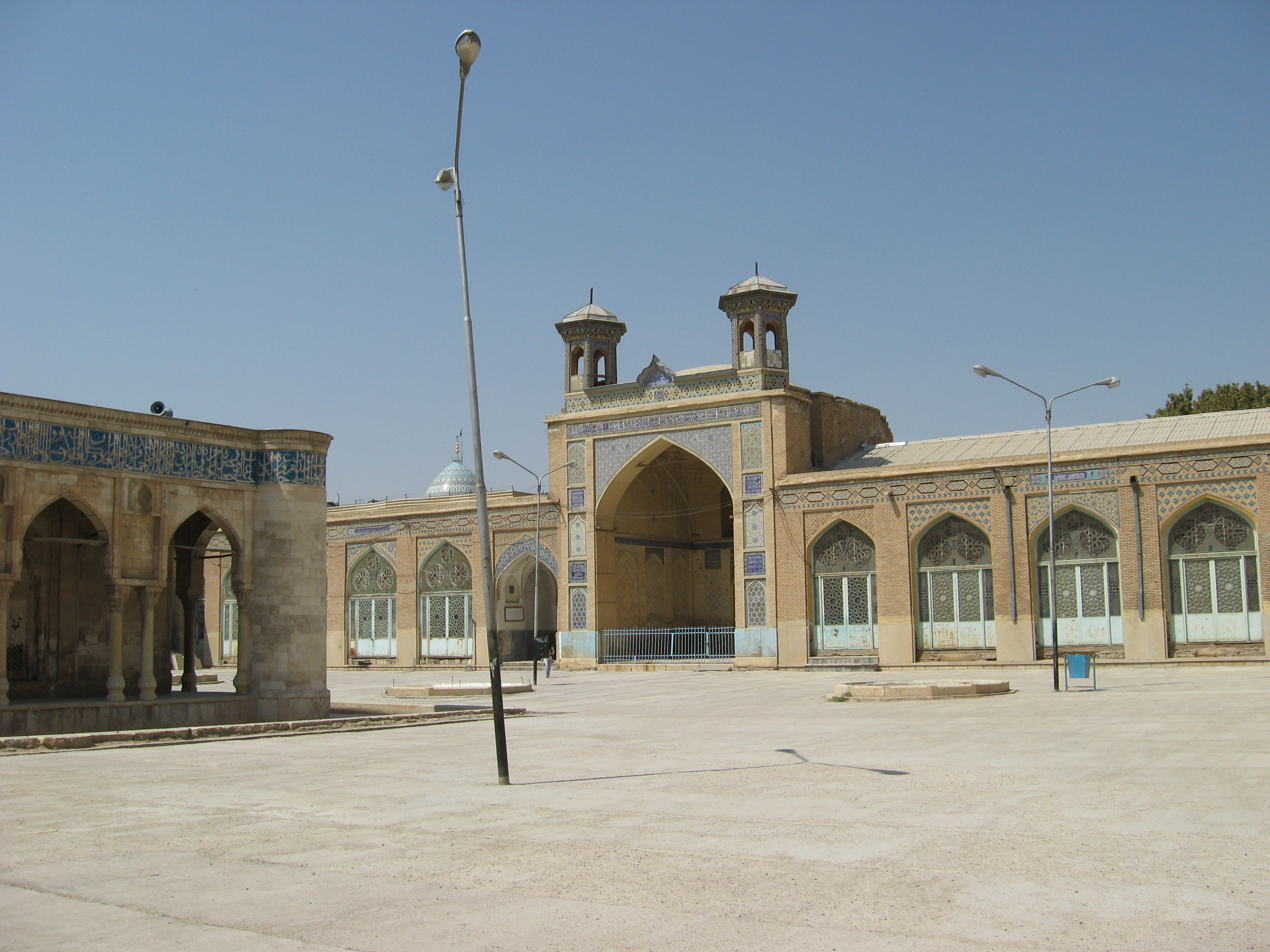
The mosque sahn, iwan, and minarets

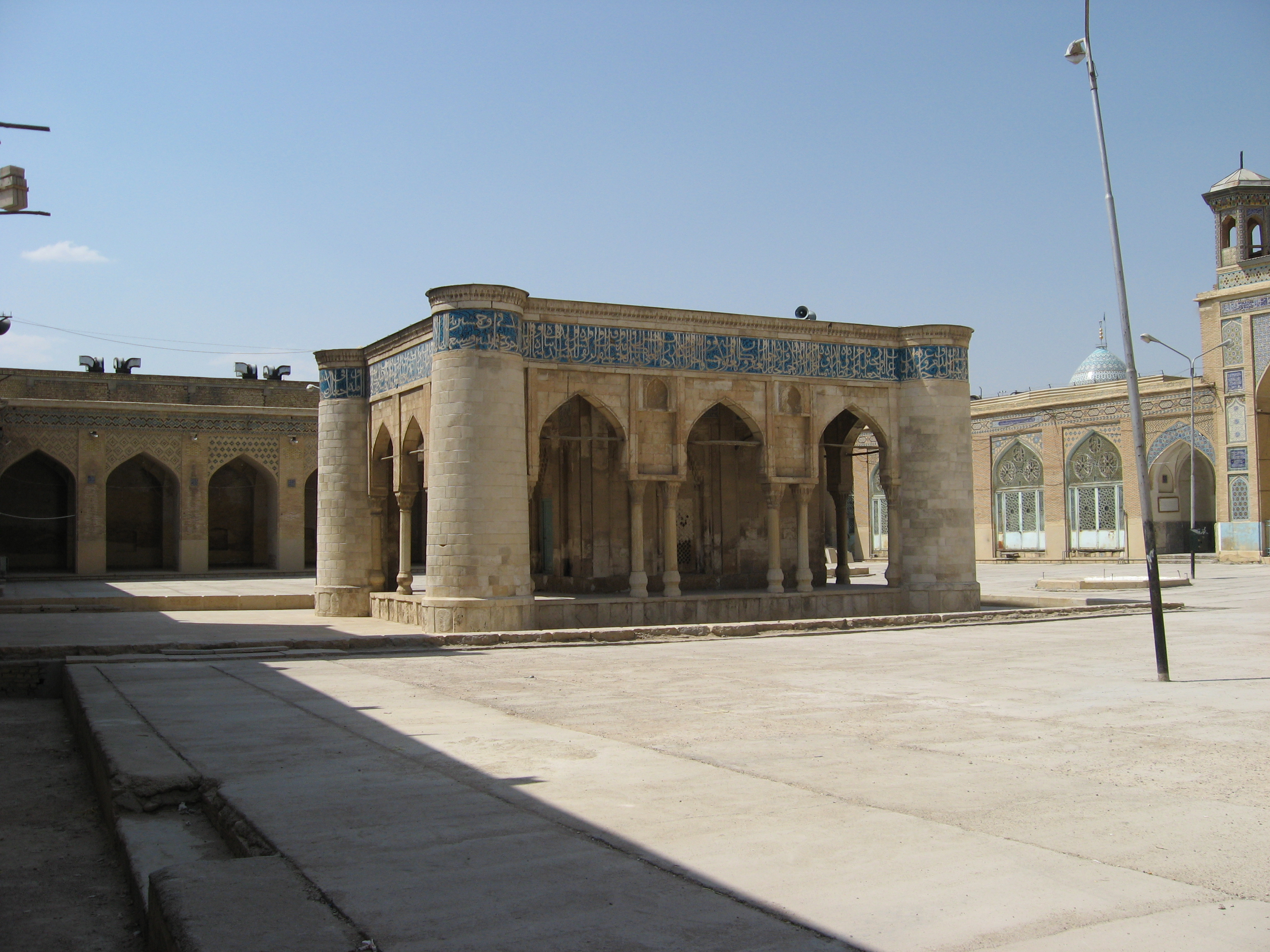
Khuda Khane

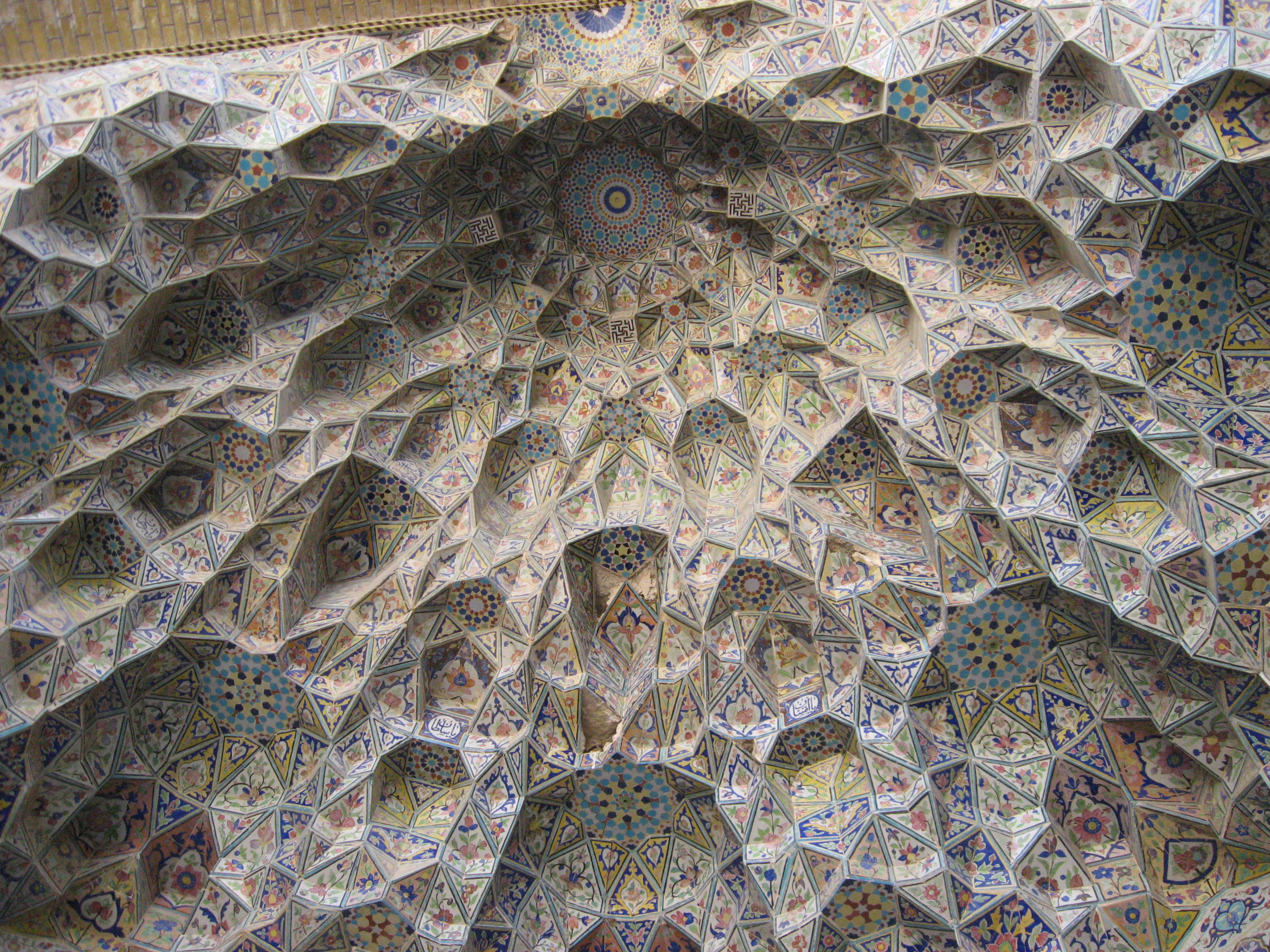
Tiled interior muqarnas on the northern iwan

== See also ==
- Shia Islam in Iran
- List of mosques in Iran
- List of oldest mosques in Iran
