= Mirza Hasan Ali Nasir ol-Molk =

Iranian aristocrat 1835–1893

Mirza Hasan Ali
- Nasir ol-Molk
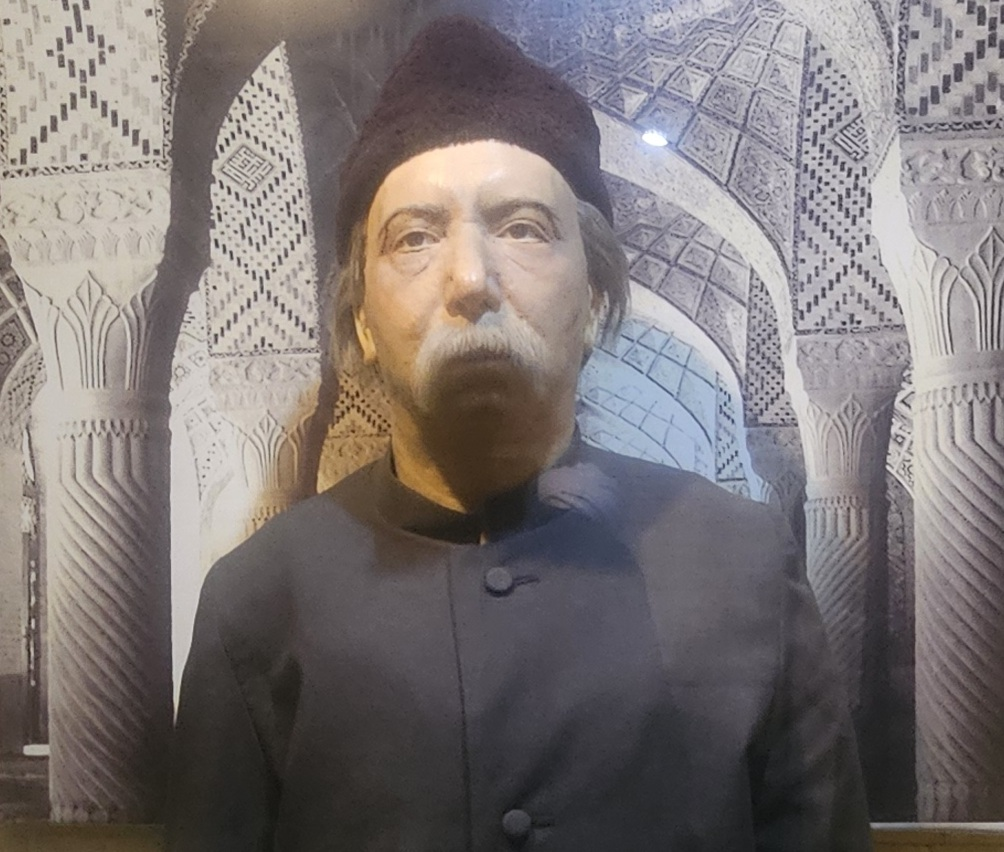
- Statue of Mirza Hasan Ali Nasir ol-Molk
- Born: 1835; Isfahan, Qajar Iran
- Died: 1893 (aged 57–58); Shiraz, Qajar Iran
- Noble family: Qavam family
- Spouse: Forough al-Molk
- Issue: Ismail Qavami
- Father: Ali Akbar Qavam ol-Molk
- Religion: Islam

Mirza Hasan Ali (Persian: میرزا حسن علی قوام; 1835 – October 1893) also known by his title Nasir ol-Molk was an aristocrat from the Qavam family who patronaged the Nasir-ol-Molk Mosque.

Hassan Ali was the youngest son of Ali Akbar Qavam ol-Molk, kalantar (lord mayor) of Shiraz. He travelled across Iran for most of his life and as such was unaware of and missed the death and funeral of his father. Upon his return to Shiraz in 1869, he made an oath to build a tomb suitable for his father. Subsequently, he began to gather money with the assistance of her sister, Zinat ol-Moluk, and from 1876 to 1888 constructed the Nasir-ol-Molk Mosque.

== Early life ==
Ali's father, Ali Akbar was one of the most influential indivituals of 19th-century Shiraz. Shortly before Ali's birth, his father was involved with a dispute with the governor of Fars, prince Hossein Ali Mirza, in which the governor wanted to claim the throne from Mohammad Mirza and Ali Akbar was against it. Hossein Ali Mirza imprisoned Fath-Ali Khan, Ali Akbar's eldest son and Ali's older brother. Therefore, to ensure his and his wife's safety, Ali Akbar moved to Isfahan, where Ali was born.

After the fall of Hossein Ali Mirza, Ali Akbar with his family returned to Shiraz. in 1843, Ali was sent to his cousin, Mirza Abolhassan Khan Ilchi, to be under his tutoring. This was cut short two years later when he had to return as a result of Ilchi's death. Thereafter, Ali began to travel across Iran. In 1858 at Mazandaran, he accidentally met with Naser al-Din Shah Qajar; there the Shah bestowed him the title of Nasir ol-Molk. Meanwhile, Ali's brother, Fath-Ali Khan died in Tehran. Ali Akbar left Shiraz for Tehran and since Ali was far from the city, he appointed his daughter, Zinat ol-Moluk as the kalantar. Ali was not pleased with the decision; however, when he realised that his sister could withstand and run the city like his father, he silenced his objection.

== The Mosque ==
In 1865, Ali Akbar died in Mashhad and was buried in Shiraz, while Ali was in Tehran. He returned in 1869 and was devastated by the news of his father's death. As such, Ali decided to build a tomb for his father so that he could be buried in a suitable place. Thus, he began his work on gathering money. His sister, Zinat ol-Moluk, provided a significant amount of the required finances. With that, Ali was able to buy a plot of land in front of the tomb of Saadi, his father's favourite poet. At this time, however, Mass'oud Mirza Zell-e Soltan was appointed as the governor of Fars and banned any construction without his permission. Zell-e Soltan's decree was not received well by either the kalantar or the people. Zinat ol-Moluk in fact, led a revolt against the governor that stopped Ali from hiring any worker or further increasing his budget.

While the conflicts were ongoing in Shiraz, Ali in 1872, married Forough ol-Molk, a daughter of Ardashir Khan, of the Bakhtiari tribe, known for her beauty. Zinat ol-Moluk built the Forough ol-Molk House, which is near the Tomb of Bibi Dokhtaran located in the north of Shiraz, for the new couple. His son, Ismail, was born a year later. in 1876, when Zell-e Soltan was removed from the governorship, Ali could begin his project. The building of the mosque lasted for twelve years and was completed in 1888. In the same year, Ali moved his father's remains to the new mosque and buried him there. Thereafter, the mosque became Qavam family's burial site as many of the members were buried there. Mirza Hasan Ali Nasir ol-Molk died in October 1893 and according to his will was buried alongside his father.

== Bibliography ==
- Ashraf, Ahmad (1999). "FĀRS iv. History in the Qajar and Pahlavi Periods". Encyclopædia Iranica, online edition. New York.
- Edrisi, Mehra (2014). "Haji Ghavam Al-Molk Shirazi". Encyclopaedia of Islamic world. Tehran.
- Hambly, Gavin R. G. (1982). "ḤOSAYN- ʿALĪ MĪRZĀ FARMĀNFARMĀ". Encyclopædia Iranica, online edition. New York.
- Heydar Abadi, Mohammad (2020). The ruling family of Qavam (in Persian). Shiraz: Fars Studies Foundation. ISBN 9786007920589.
- Mehrabi, Golam Hossein (2018). History of Qawam al-Mulk (in Persian). Shiraz: Shahcheragh Publications. ISBN 9786008950127.
- Moghadam, Sohrab Yazdani (Winter 2014). "Rise and Fall of Shiraz Bureaucrat Families during The Naseri Era (1847-1895)" (PDF). History of Islam Studies (in Persian). 7 (23): 255–289.
