= Ali Akbar Qavam ol-Molk =

Iranian statesman (1788–1865)

- علی اکبر قوام الملک
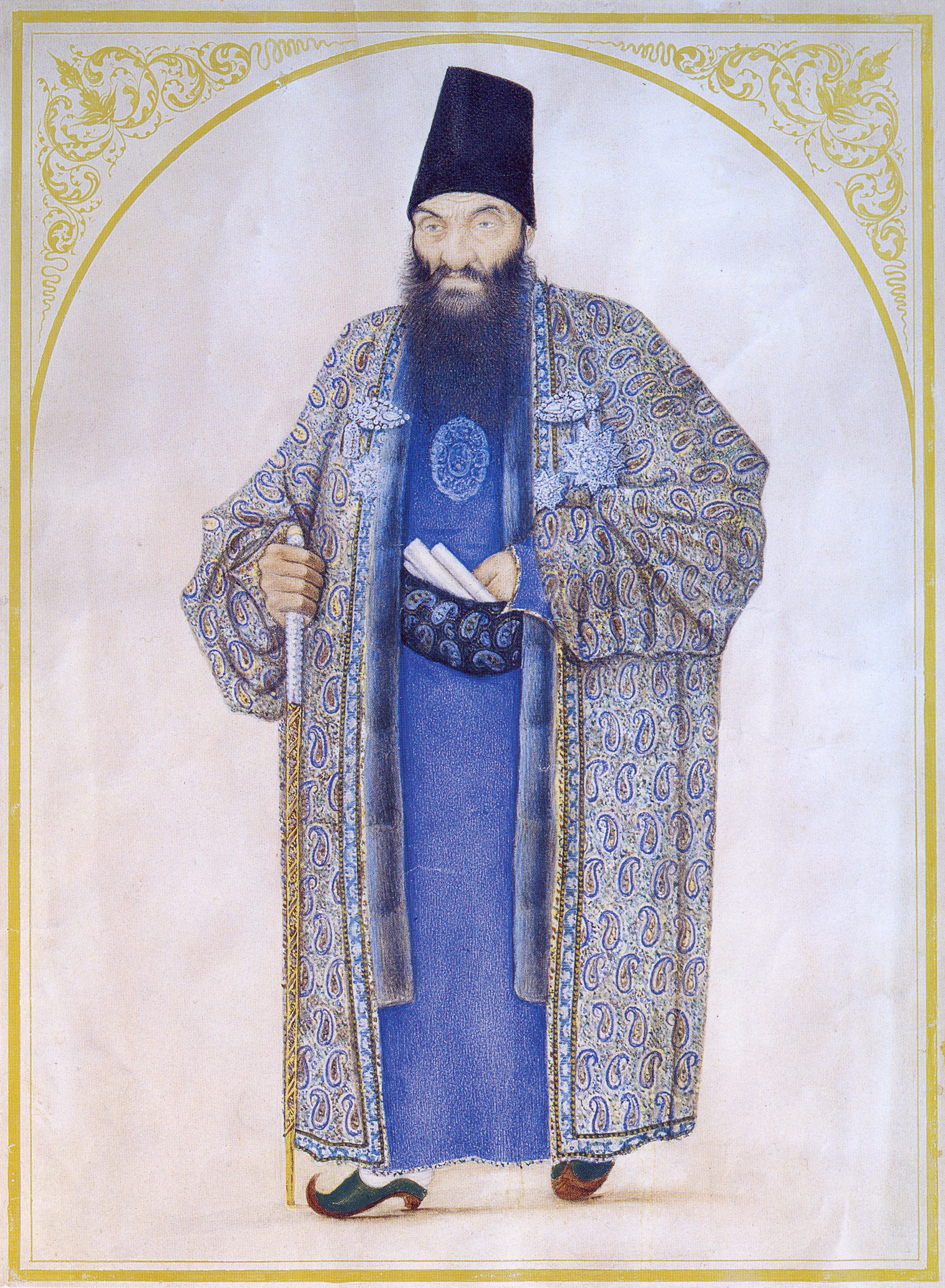
- Qavam ol-Molk by Sani al-Molk, circa 1860s

Kalantar of Shiraz
- In office 1811 – 21 June 1858
- Monarchs: Fath-Ali Shah Qajar (r. 1797–1834); Mohammad Shah Qajar (r. 1834–1848); Naser al-Din Shah Qajar (r. 1848–1896)
- Succeeded by: Zinat al-Moluk

Personal details
- Born: 1788 Shiraz, Zand Iran
- Died: 1865 (aged 76–77) Mashhad, Qajar Iran
- Resting place: Shiraz
- Children: Fath-Ali Khan; Mirza Hassan Ali; Zinat al-Moluk
- Parent: Hajji Ebrahim Shirazi (father)

Ali Akbar Qavam ol-Molk (Persian: علی اکبر قوام الملک; 1788–1865) was an Iranian statesman who served as the kalantar (lord mayor) of Shiraz and Custodian of Astan Quds Razavi in the Qajar era. He was the youngest son of Hajji Ebrahim Shirazi, the grand vizier of Fath-Ali Shah Qajar who by the latter's order was executed, his family too, subsequently purged. Ali Akbar was one of the survivors. Later for appeasement by the orders of Fath-Ali Shah, his family lands were returned and he became the kalantar of Shiraz, thus marking the start of Qavam family.

During his 47-year tenure, Qavam ol-Molk built a strong prestige and authority over not only Shiraz but Fars and the court of the Qajar shahs. For that he even maintained his power after leaving his position as the kalantar. Ali Akbar was a patron of the arts, and ordered the building of several of Shiraz's most notable sites such as the Qavam House. He was succeeded by his daughter, Zinat al-Moluk; that decision was not accepted fondly by the officials.

== Early life ==
Ali Akbar was born in 1788 at Shiraz, the youngest son of Hajji Ebrahim Shirazi, the then kalantar (lord mayor) who in a turn of events became the grand vizier of Agha Mohammad Khan and Fath-Ali Shah. However, by 1801 he was a case of the Shah's rage that resulted to his death and purge of his family. The only survivors were Ali Akbar who was sick at the time and his sister Mahbanu Khanum whose execution was opposed by the officials.

Ali Akbar stayed in Shiraz for ten years until 1811, when in an act of appeasement, Fath-Ali Shah granted him the family lands and made him the kalantar of Shiraz.

== Kalantar of Shiraz ==
=== Early years ===
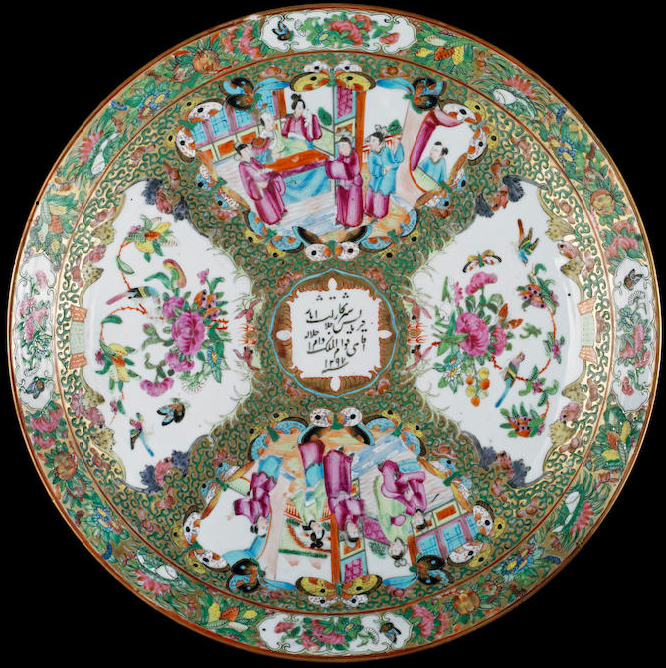
Cantonese Porcelain sent as a gift to Fath-Ali Shah by Qavam al-Molk

Ali Akbar like his father, had a clever and opportunist mind, as the kalantar, he made alliances with tribal leaders across Fars such as Mohammad Ali Khan, Ilkhan of Qashqa'i tribe. He used this alliances to move the tribes to a large area far from Fars, in case of any revolts. He granted the governorship of this area to Fath-Ali Shah's son, Abdollah Mirza, later this province was called as Khamseh. In an attempt to gain the Shah's favour, in 1821, he named his new born son Fath-Ali and sent the Shah several Shiraz rugs and a Cantonese Porcelain dish with an inscription of his name in the middle. His actions were successful as in his royal tour in 1829, Fath-Ali Shah bestowed upon him the title of Qavam ol-Molk.

However even the Shah's support could not stop the Governor of Fars, Hossein Ali Mirza, from plotting against him consistently as he wanted to seize Shiraz from Ali Akbar. He made a move when Morteza Qoli Khan, an ally to Ali Akbar, in 1830 rebelled against the governor. Ali Akbar, for ensuring of his safety, with his son, took refuge to Hashemieh, the traditional Maktab of his family that was built by his great-grandfather, Mahmoud. Ali Mirza on the other hand, assaulted the maktab and arrested Ali Akbar and his son, but later with having no evidence, was inevitable to free them. When in 1834, Fath-Ali Shah died, Ali Mirza did not recognised Mohammad Mirza's succession and proclaimed himself as the new king. Ali Akbar did not supported the governor's decision, thus Ali Mirza ordered his son, Fath-Ali to be arrested and then executed, however with the mediation of Hajji Mohammad Hossein Khan Amin al-Dowla, the governor's vizier, Ali Mirza was content to imprison him in the Arg of Karim Khan. Ali Akbar went to Isfahan knowing that its governor, Sayf ol-Dowleh, has a pro-Mohammad Mirza policy. During this time, his second son, Hassan Ali was born.

=== Disputes and retiring ===
In 1835, when Hossein Ali Mirza was defeated and removed from the governorship, Ali Akbar with glorious welcoming returned to Shiraz. Mohammad Shah rewarded him with the title of treasurer of Fars which Ali Akbar accepted it, but by 1840, he arranged a marriage between his son Fath-Ali and Aziz ol-Dowleh, daughter of Mohammad Shah, and granted the treasurer title to him, though he kept his de facto role. However the dispute with the governor of Fars, Mirza Hossein Khan, left no choice but leaving the treasury. With Mohammad Shah's death in 1848, the unrests in Fars began again. The unrests were a result of dispute between the governor of Fars and Amir Kabir, the premier of the new king, Naser al-Din Shah. Ali Akbar used this situation and led a revolt along with Mohammad Qoli Khan Ilbeigi, the representative of the Fars tribes. He gathered 15000 men and with Ilbeigi, besieged Shiraz, demanding the removal of Hossein Khan. However later, Ali Akbar realised that his forces could not resist against the Tehran army, thus he left Ilbeigi and joined Hossein Khan, asking for his pardon. After the revolt Ali Akbar's authority was not shaked as Naser al-Din Shah with knowledge of his influence over Fars, often would greet him with gifts such as a carbuncled cane and even bestowed his son the title saheb divan and appointed him as Supervisor of the treasury and finances of his court.

The last decade of Ali Akbar's tenure was spent in his patronage for rebuilding Shiraz. In 1856 when the British Empire occupied Bushehr, Ali Akbar sent an army to provide defence against the invaders. Knowing that the Armenian minority of Shiraz would be targeted with threats because of this invasion, the bishop of Isfahan asked Ali Akbar to defend the Shiraz Christians against the outraged people. Therefore, Ali Akbar made sure to have the lutis defend the Christians. On 21 June 1858, news reached Shiraz that Ali Akbar's son, Fath-Ali Khan was murdered in Tehran, Ali Akbar Immediately left Shiraz for Tehran, retired from his position and appointed his daughter, Zinat al-Moluk as the kalantar, partly because his other son, Hassan Ali was far away from Fars and partly because he saw a cleverness in his daughter. Although his decision was not accepted fondly, Zinat al-Moluk suppressed all opposition and asserted her authority.

== Later years and death ==
Ali Akbar in his later years was appointed as the Custodian of Astan Quds Razavi, the position that he held until his death. He died in 1865, his body returned to Shiraz, and in one of the most crowded funerals in the city's history, was buried in his birthplace. The first place that Ali Akbar's body was buried is unknown since in 1888, Mirza Hassan Ali, Ali Akbar's youngest son, moved his father's remains to the newly built Nasir-ol-Molk Mosque.

== Contributions ==
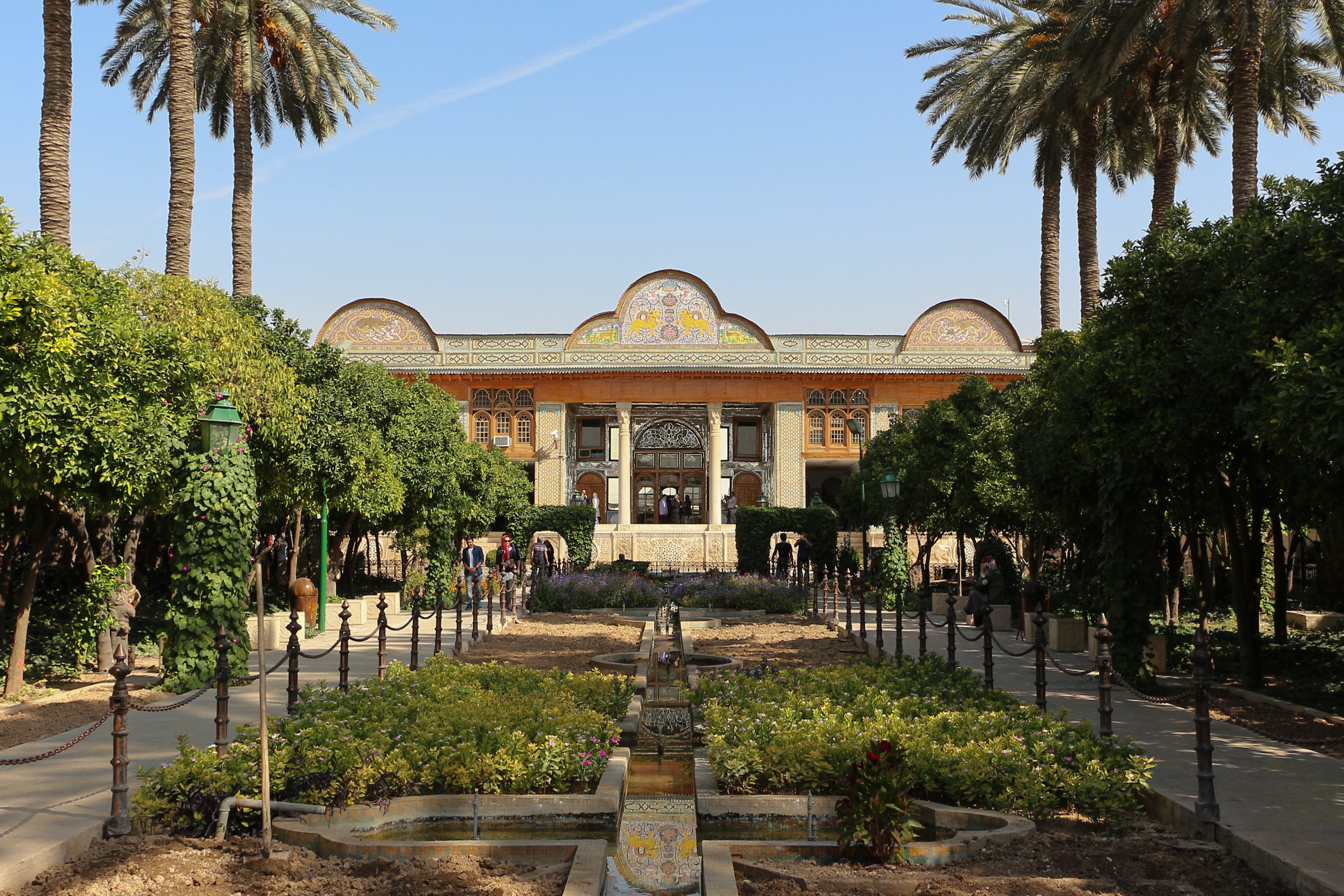
Qavam House, Shiraz

Ali Akbar ordered the building of several pavilions, the most prominent of which was the Qavam House. The main building of the house has two floors and a basement below it. The design of the main building and the two-column porch of the mansion are adapted from the common architectural style of the Zand era. The most remarkable part of the building is its large porch decorated with two integrated stone columns and a flat roof.

Other than the Qavam House, Ali Akbar built several maktabs and a Tekyeh dedicated to his father. He also repaired the headstone of Saadi as it was damaged by the fatwa of a Shia mullah.

== Bibliography ==
- Al Davood, Ebrahim (2019). "Ebrahim Kalantar". The Great Islamic Encyclopaedia (in Persian). Tehran.
- Amanat, Abbas (1997). "EBRĀHĪM KALĀNTAR ŠĪRĀZĪ". Encyclopædia Iranica, online edition. New York.
- Bojnordi, Mohammad Kazem (2004). "Ajodan Bashi, Hossein Khan". The Great Islamic Encyclopaedia (in Persian). Tehran.
- Davies, Charles Edward (1987). "Qajar Rule in Fars Prior to 1849". Iran. 25: 125–153. doi:10.2307/4299789. ISSN 0578-6967. JSTOR 4299789. OCLC 819189725.
- Edrisi, Mehra (2014). "Haji Ghavam Al-Molk Shirazi". Encyclopaedia of Islamic world. Tehran.
- Ghadimi Ghidari, Abbas (Fall 2014). "Backgrounds and Consequences of Fars State Elites Immigration: the Case Study of Shiraz Hashemieh-Qavam Family (1792-1829)". Journal of Historical Researches (in Persian) (3): 36–48. OCLC 1244446711.
- Hambly, Gavin R. G. (1982). "ḤOSAYN- ʿALĪ MĪRZĀ FARMĀNFARMĀ". Encyclopædia Iranica, online edition. New York.
- Heydar Abadi, Mohammad (2020). The ruling family of Qavam (in Persian). Shiraz: Fars Studies Foundation. ISBN 9786007920589.
- Moghadam, Sohrab Yazdani (Winter 2014). "Rise and Fall of Shiraz Bureaucrat Families during The Naseri Era (1847-1895)" (PDF). History of Islam Studies (in Persian). 7 (23): 255–289.
