= Lyricism =

Expressive quality in art

Lyricism is a term used to describe a piece of art considered to have deep emotions. Its origin is found in the word lyric, derived via Latin lyricus from the Greek λυρικός (lurikós), the adjectival form of lyre. It is often employed to relate to the capability of a lyricist.

== Description ==
Lyricism is primarily used to give a description of art that is thought to have a particularly expressive quality. It is often used in conjunction with art composed of sound alone, but can apply to all forms of art, including paintings, performances, poetries, architectures, or films.

== Uses ==
The following are examples of lyricism:

- Architecture: The Nasir-ol-Molk Mosque may be seen as an example, as well as the Taj Mahal or the Sistine Chapel. Modern examples would be some of the later works of Le Corbusier and Zaha Hadid.
- Dance: Tchaikovsky's Swan Lake or The Sleeping Beauty exhibit classic lyricism.
- Film: Lost, Lost, Lost (1976) has been described as an example of the mid-20th century lyricism movement in film, as well as The Art of Vision (1965) and Fireworks (1947).
- Music: In jazz, Charlie Parker is renowned for his lyricism. Nearly all of Wolfgang Amadeus Mozart's work has been revered for its lyricism.
- Poetry: Maya Angelou's poetry has intrinsic lyricism.

== See also ==
- Art
- Beauty
- Emotion
- Imagination
- Lyric poetry
- Western canon
