= Eram Garden =

UNESCO World Heritage Site in Shiraz, Iran

Bagh-e Eram
UNESCO World Heritage Site
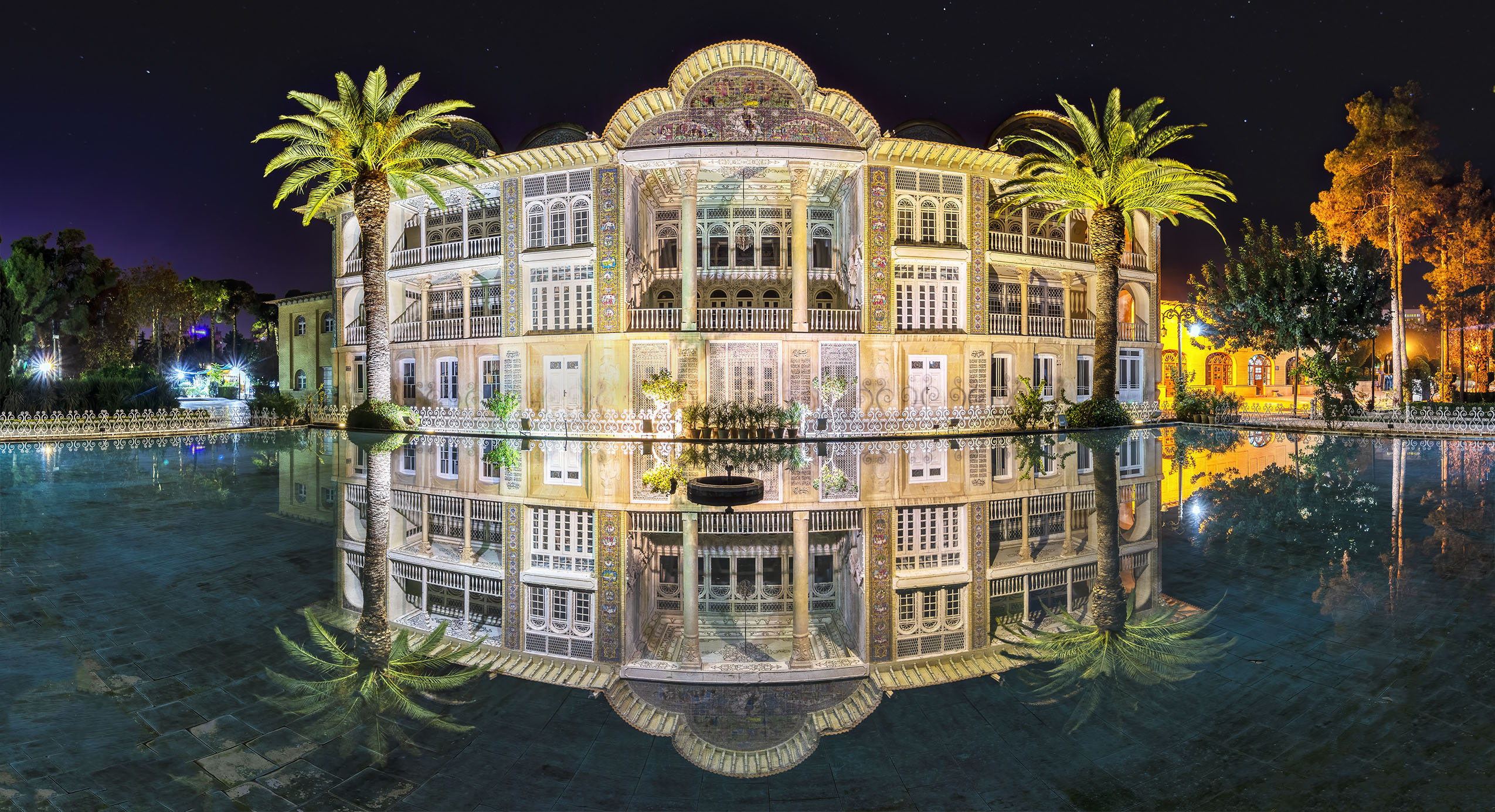

- Location within Iran
- Location: Shiraz, Fars province, Iran
- Part of: The Persian Garden
- Criteria: Cultural: (i)(ii)(iii)(iv)(vi)
- Reference: 1372-002
- Inscription: 2011 (35th Session)
- Area: 12.7 ha (1,370,000 sq ft)
- Buffer zone: 70.5 ha (7,590,000 sq ft)
- Coordinates: 29°38′09″N 52°31′31″E

Eram Garden (Persian: باغ ارم, romanized: Bāgh-e Eram) is a historic Persian garden in Shiraz, Iran. The garden, and the building within it, are located at the northern shore of the Khoshk River in the Fars province.

== History ==
The origins of the garden may go back to the 12th century, during the Seljuk era, when a garden later called Bagh-e Shah probably existed on this site up to the 18th century. This may have influenced the overall layout of the current garden.

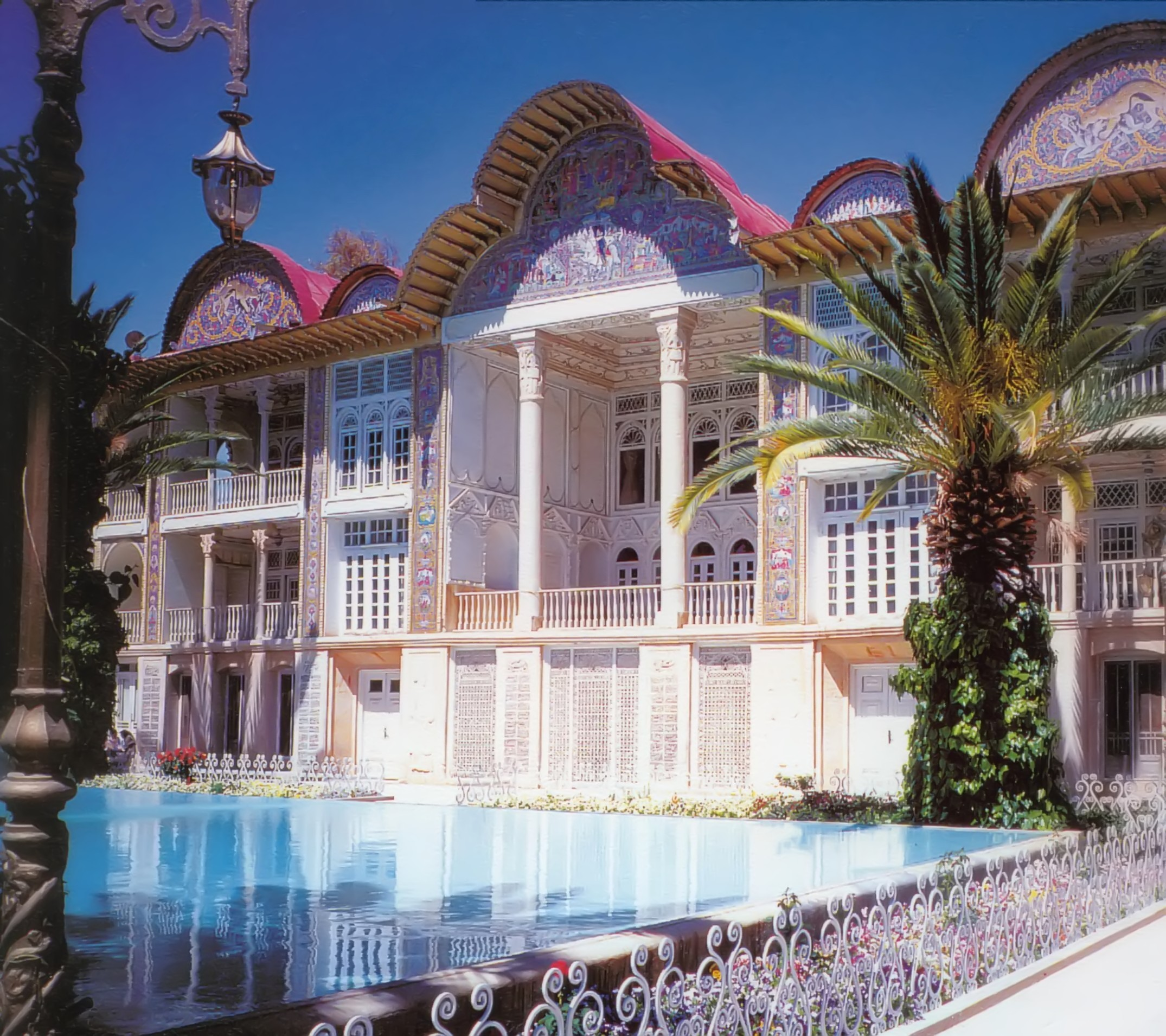
Qavam House in Eram Garden

The current garden and its pavilions were designed and built in the 19th century, during the Qajar era. The garden was established in 1824 by Muhammad Qoli Khan Ilkhani, the chief of the Qashqai tribe. At this time, it included a three-story residential pavilion with a front porch supported by two columns. The estate was later sold to Nasir ol-Molk, who commissioned the architect Muhammad Hasan (the same architect who worked on the Nasir-ol-Molk Mosque) to rebuild the pavilion in its current form between 1875 and 1897.

Today, Eram Garden is part of the Shiraz Botanical Garden of Shiraz University. It is open to the public as a historic landscape garden. They are a World Heritage Site and protected by Iran's Ministry of Cultural Heritage, Tourism and Handicrafts.

== Gallery ==
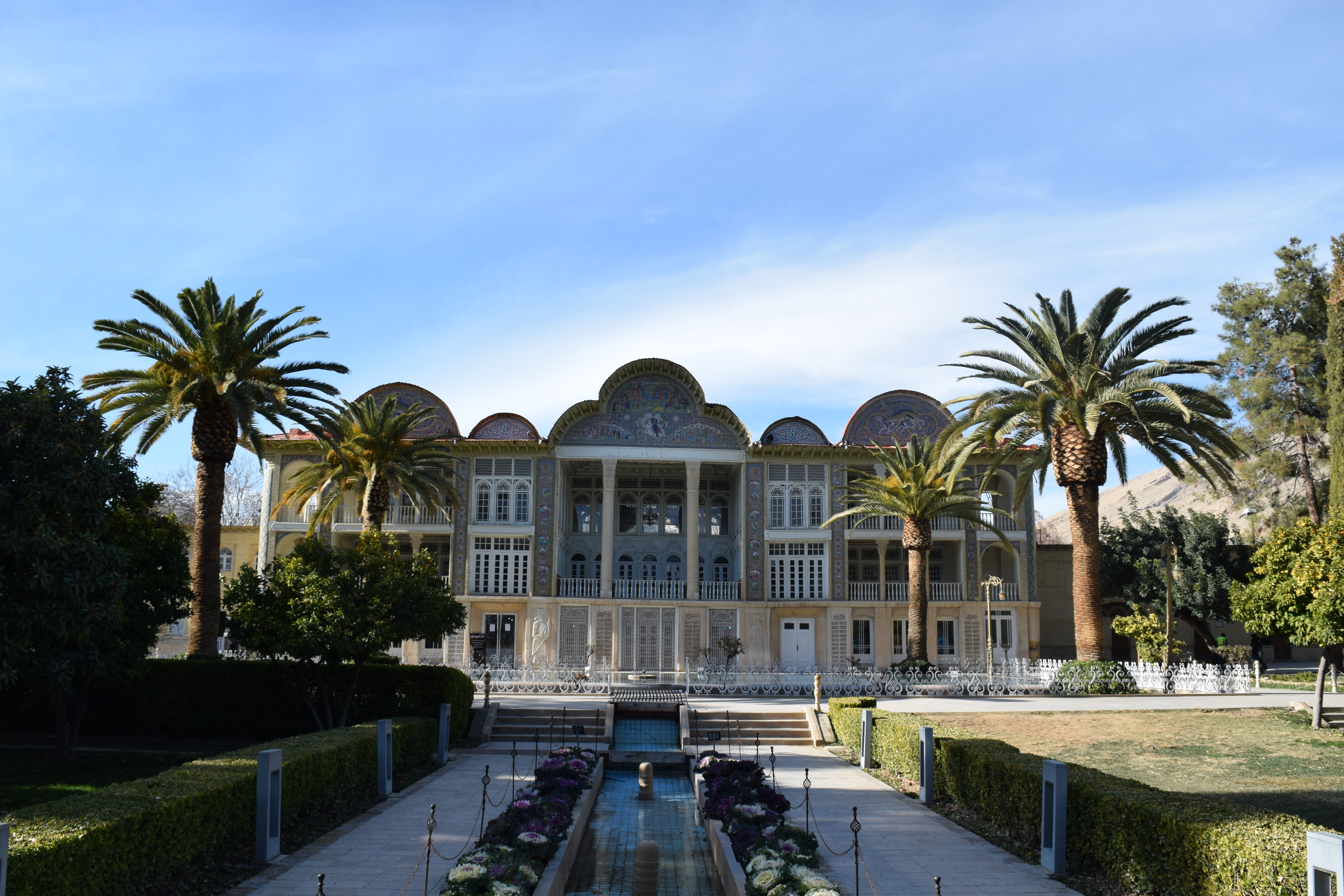
Wide view of the building

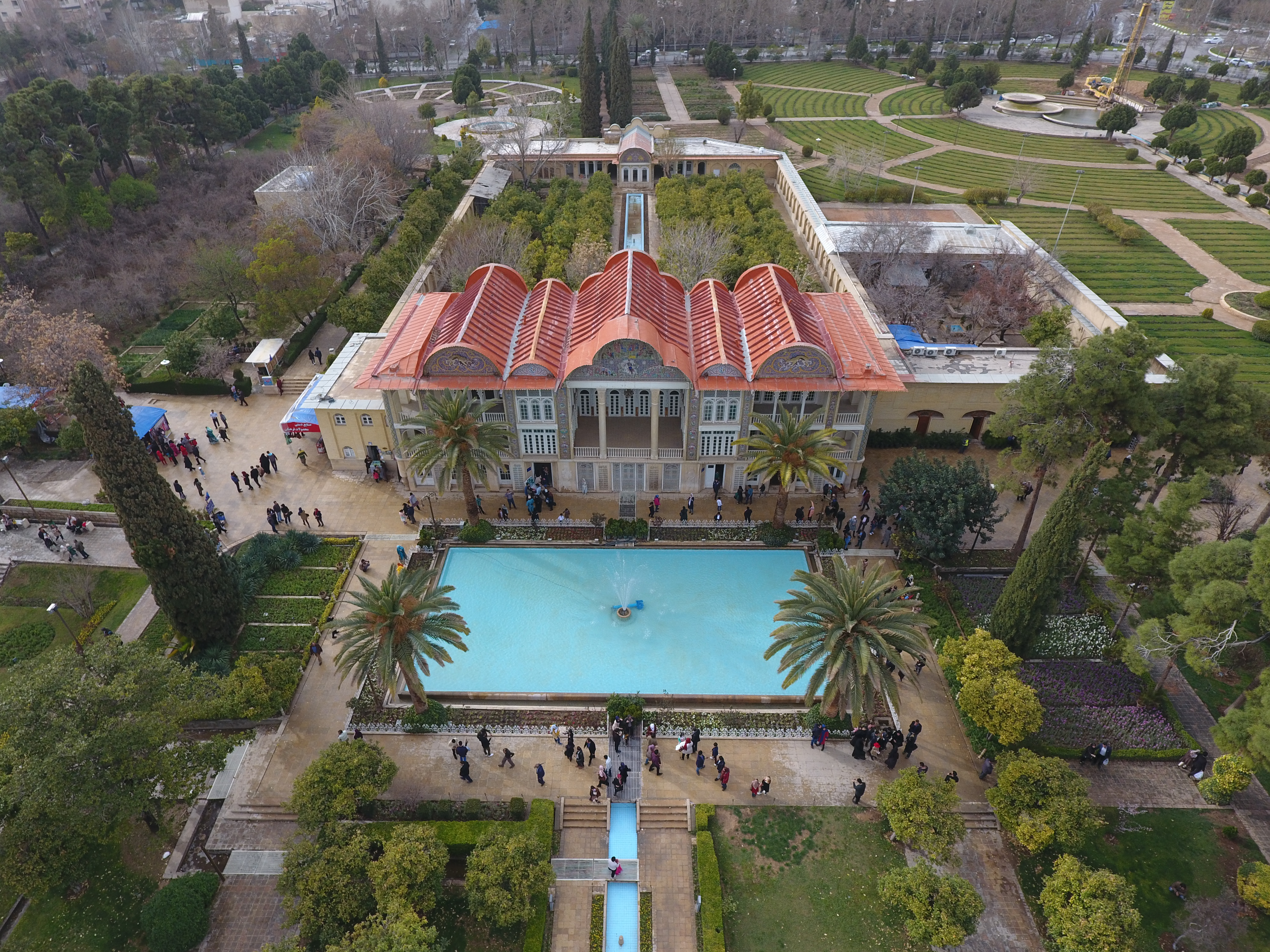
Aerial view of the building

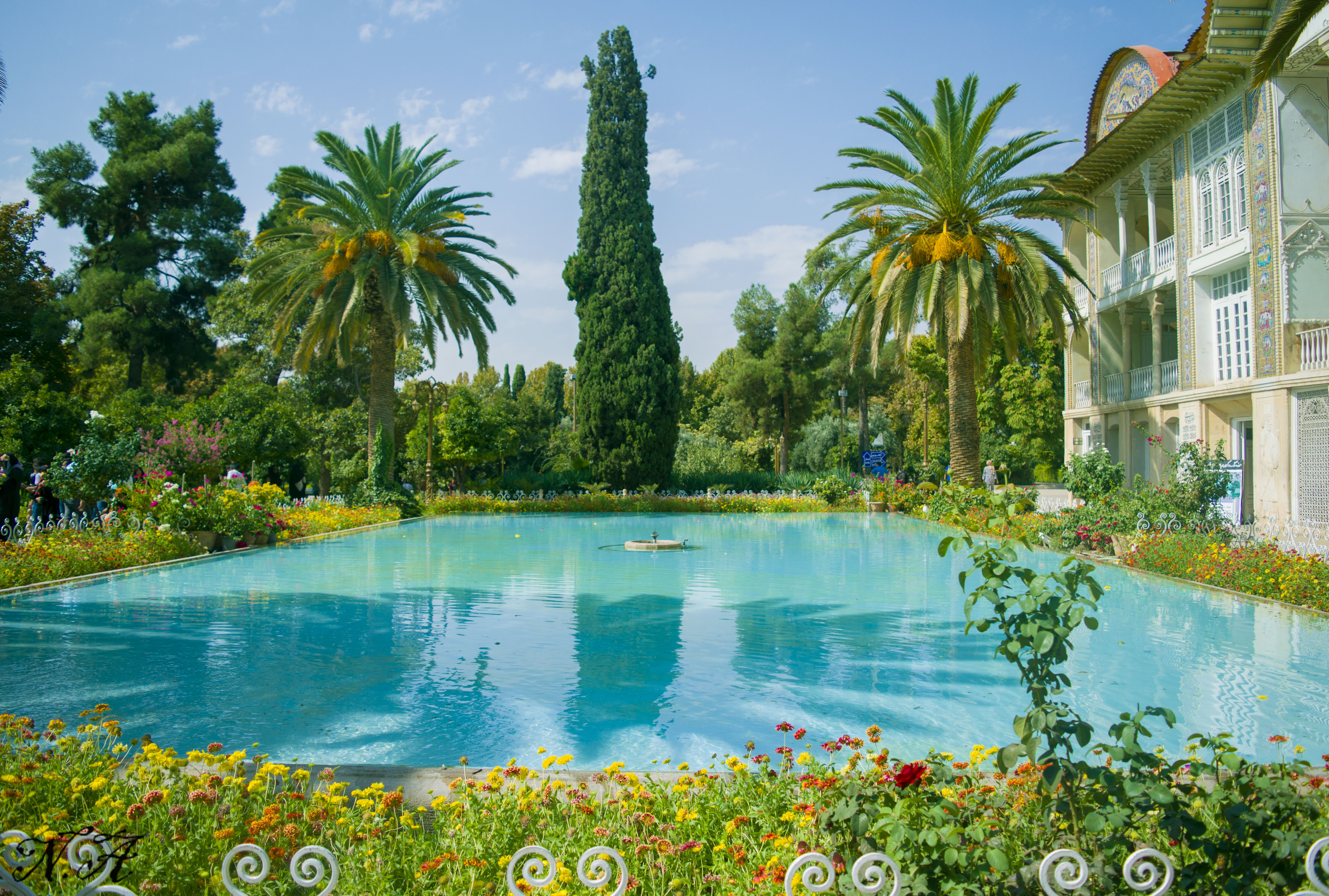
Howz (Ornamental pool) of the Eram Garden

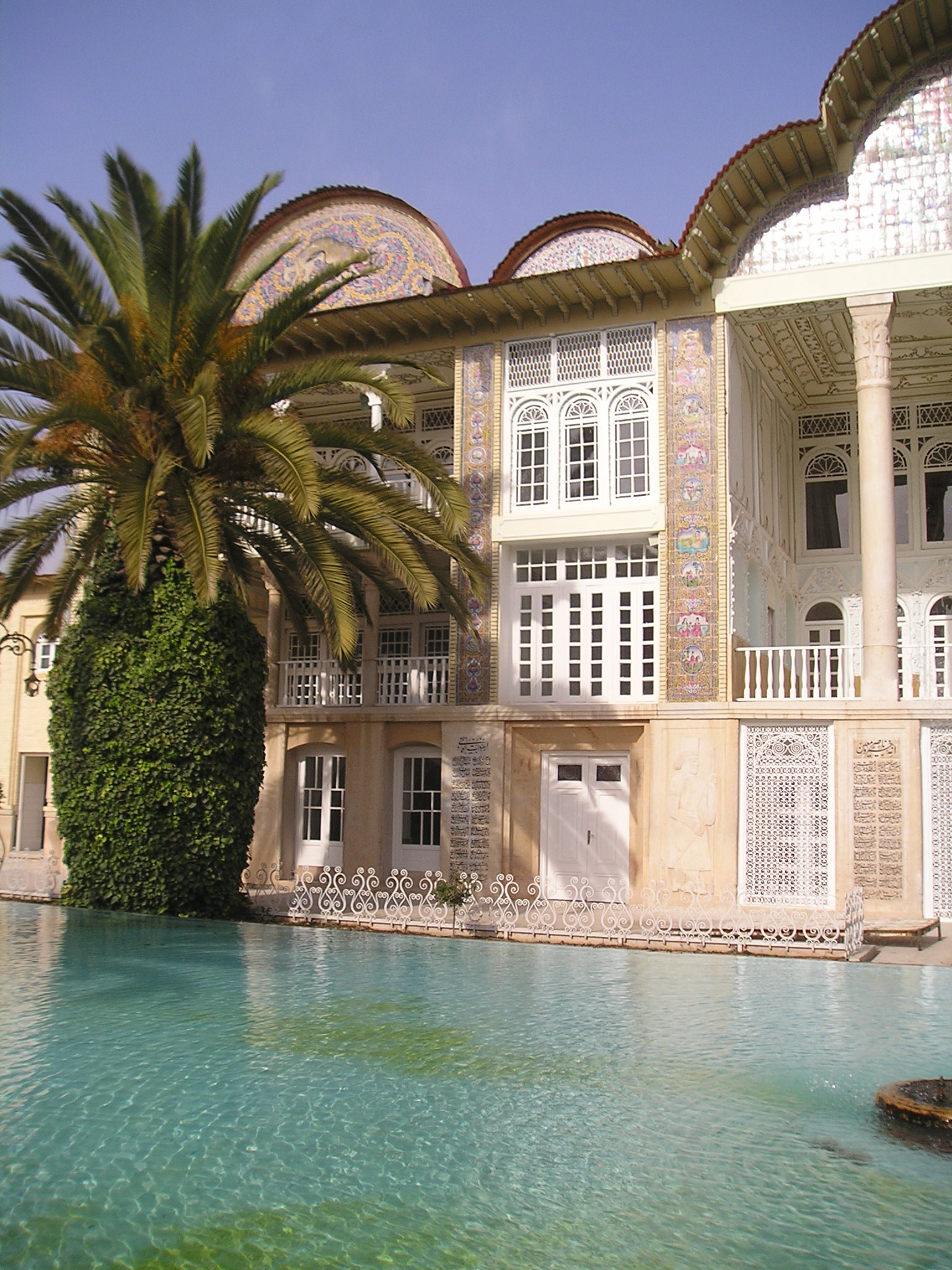
Howz and date palm at Eram Garden

== See also ==
- Persian gardens
- Iranian architecture
- Qavam House
