= Fath-Ali Khan Saheb Divan =

Iranian treasurer (1821–1858)

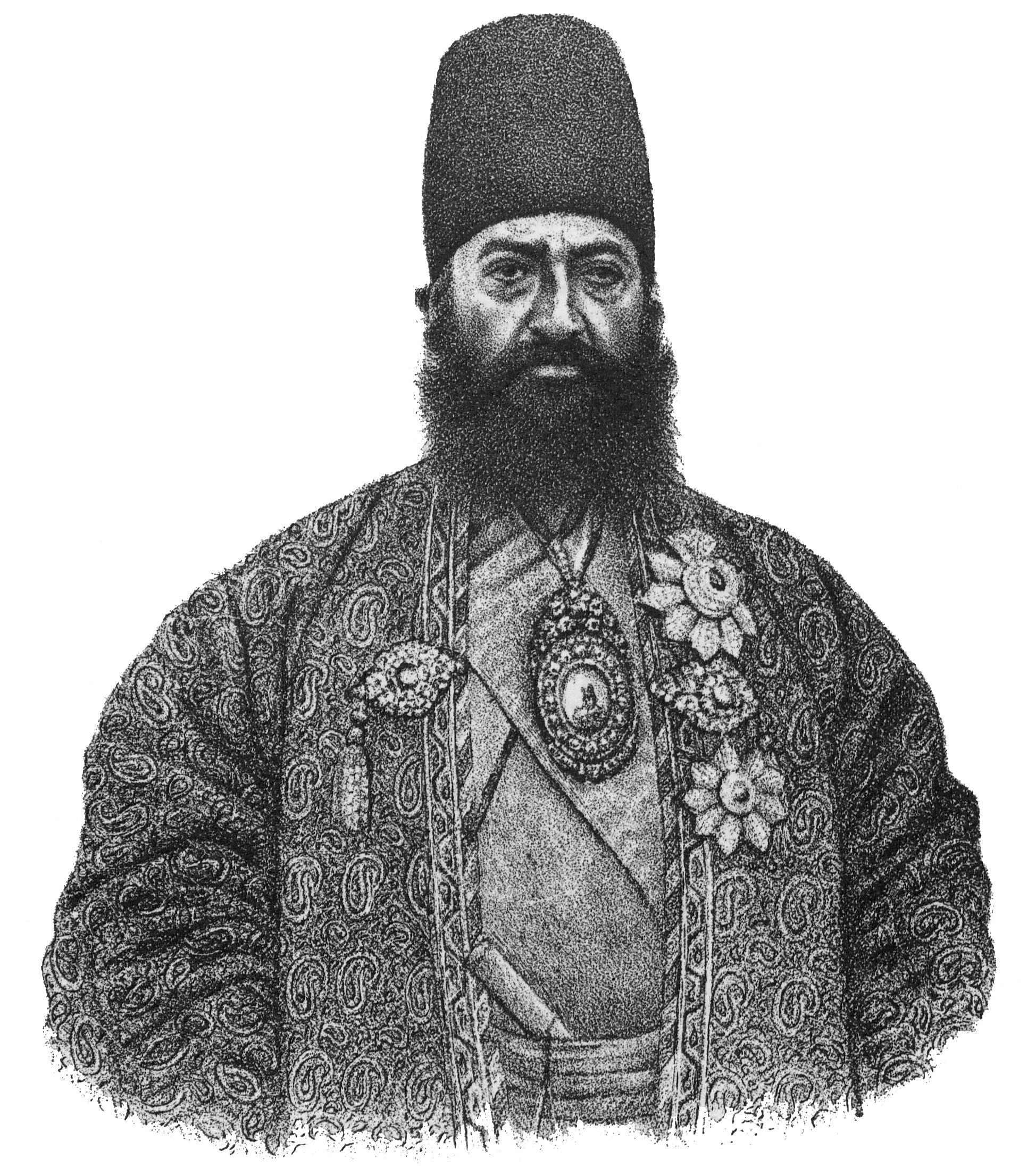
Fath-Ali Khan by Abu Torab Ghaffari

Fath-Ali Khan Saheb Divan (Persian: فتحعلی‌خان صاحب‌دیوان; 1821 – 21 June 1858) was an Iranian treasurer who served as the saheb divan of the court of Naser al-Din Shah Qajar.

Saheb Divan was the eldest son of Ali Akbar Qavam ol-Molk of the Qavam family. His father named him in honour of Fath-Ali Shah Qajar.

He entered government work in 1840, when his father appointed him as the treasurer of Fars, he also arranged a marriage between Fath-Ali and Aziz ol-Dowleh, a daughter of Mohammad Shah Qajar. Fath-Ali worked in the treasury for eight years.

In 1848, Naser al-Din Shah bestowed him the title of saheb divan and made him the treasurer of his court. He gradually grew in the court and even became the minister of Mozaffar ad-Din Mirza at some point. His progress however was worrisome for Mirza Aqa Khan Nuri, thus on his behest, on 21 June 1858, a group of outlaws murdered Fath-Ali Khan on his way to the shah's palace.
