= Nasir-ol-Molk Mosque =

Mosque in Shiraz, Iran

- مسجد نصیرالملک
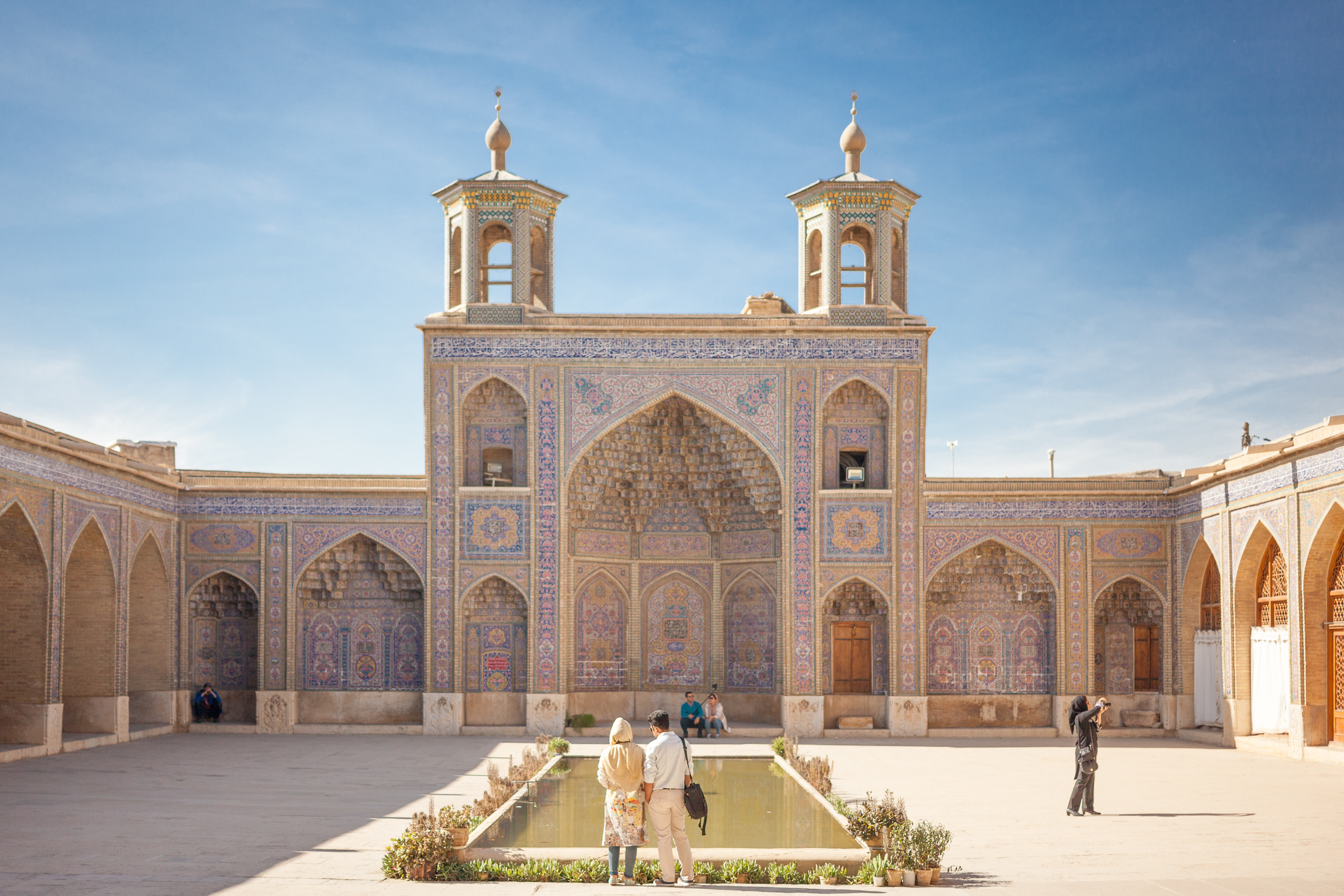
- The mosque's southern iwan and sahn with turret-style minarets, in 2016

- Location of the mosque in Iran

Religion
- Affiliation: Shia Islam
- Ecclesiastical or organisational status: Mosque
- Status: Active

Location
- Location: Shiraz, Fars
- Country: Iran
- Administration: Endowment Foundation of Nasir-ol-Molk
- Coordinates: 29°36′31″N 52°32′54″E

Architecture
- Architects: Mohammad Hasan-e-Memār; Mohammad Hosseini Shirazi; Mohammad Rezā Kāshi-Sāz-e-Širāzi
- Type: Mosque architecture
- Style: Iranian (including Panj Kāse); Qajar
- Founder: Mirza Hasan Ali Nasir ol-Molk
- Groundbreaking: 1876 CE
- Completed: 1888 CE

Specifications
- Interior area: 2,414 m^{2} (25,980 sq ft)
- Dome: One (maybe more)
- Minaret: Two (subdued turrets)
- Site area: 2,980 m^{2} (32,100 sq ft)
- Materials: Stained glass; ceramics; timber; marble

Website
- nasiralmulk.ir

Iran National Heritage List
- Official name: Nasir-ol-Molk Mosque
- Type: Mosque
- Designated: 1955
- Reference no.: 396
- Conservation organization: Cultural Heritage, Handicrafts and Tourism Organization of Iran

The Nasir-ol-Molk Mosque (Persian: مسجد نصیرالملک, romanized: Masjed-e Nasir ol-Molk), also known as the Pink Mosque (Persian: مسجد صورتی, romanized: Masjed-e Surati), is a mosque located in Shiraz, in the province of Fars, Iran. Completed in 1888 CE, the Qajar era mosque is located in the Gowd-e Araban district of Shiraz, south of Lotfali Khan Zand Street, next to the Shāh Chérāgh Mosque.

The mosque includes extensive stained glass in its façade, and displays other traditional elements such as the Panj Kāse ("five concaved") design.

The mosque was added to the Iran National Heritage List in 1955, administered by the Cultural Heritage, Handicrafts and Tourism Organization of Iran. It is a major tourist attraction in Shiraz, especially at sunrise when sunlight hits the stained glass.

== History ==
The mosque was constructed between 1876 and 1888 and is under the protection of the Endowment Foundation of Nasir-ol-Molk. Construction of the mosque was commissioned by Mirza Hasan Ali Nasir ol-Molk, an aristocratic lord of Shiraz and the son of Ali Akbar Qavam ol-Molk, the kalantar of Shiraz.

== Architecture ==
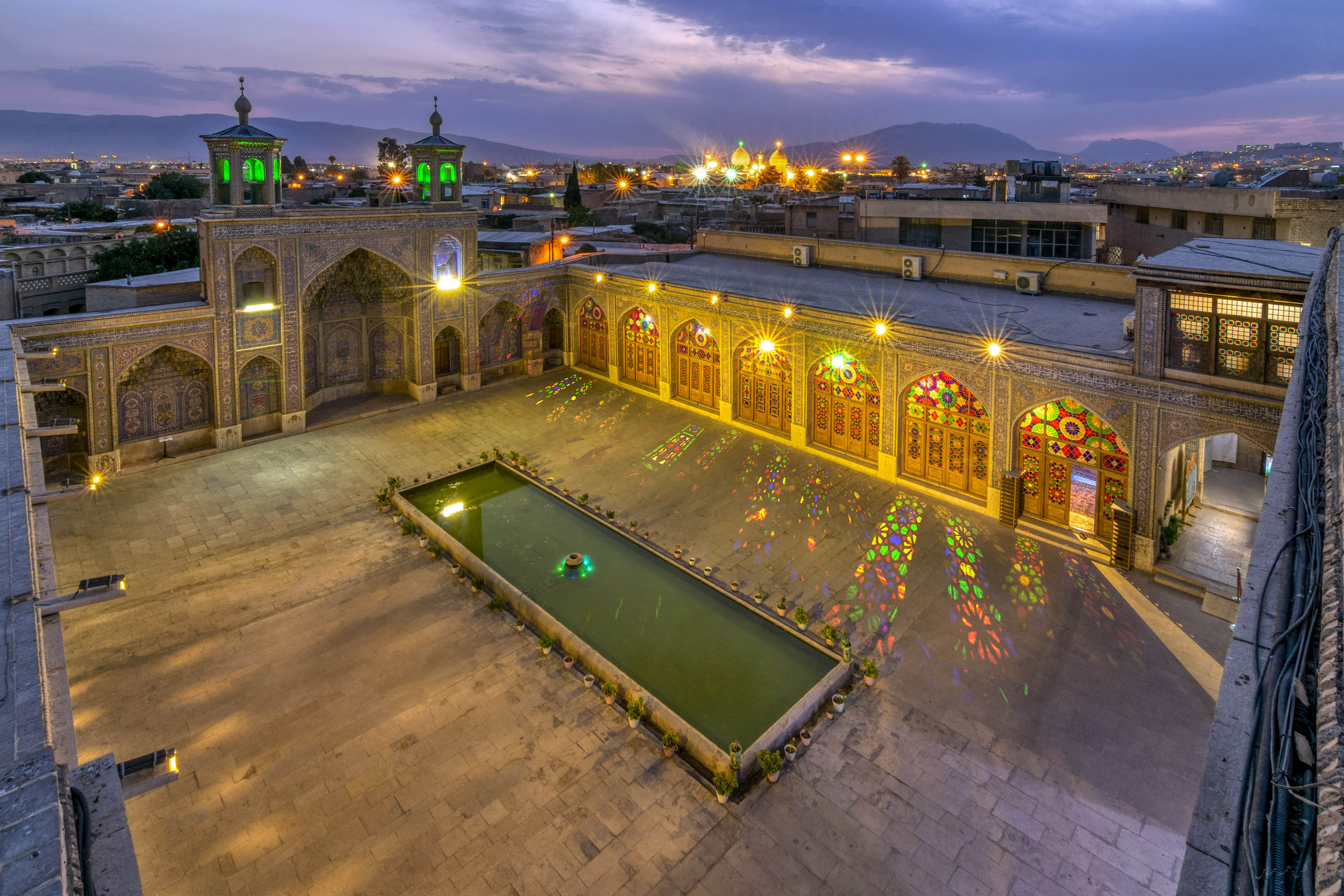
The mosque's courtyard

The mosque was completed in the Qajar style and was designed by Mohammad Hasan-e-Memār, a Persian architect who had also built the noted Eram Garden before the Nasir-ol-Molk Mosque, Mohammad Hosseini Shirazi, and Mohammad Rezā Kāshi-Sāz-e-Širāzi. There is a poem inscribed on marble at the mosque's entrance and the mosque contains extensive use of blue, yellow, pink, azure, and white tiles.

The Nasir ol-Molk Mosque has two Shabestans, and the interior decoration of the western (or winter) Shabestan consists of a series of arches and vaults and two rows of six columns that divide the interior into smaller sections. The western Shabestan is connected to the sahn by seven wooden doors, each decorated by Gereh Chini, with extensive use of stained glass. The passage of light through the stained glass in red, azure, yellow, orange, and green colors is a major tourist attraction. There is a shallow and wide pool in the middle of the sahn. The Nasir ol-Molk Mosque has two north and south porches, each different from the other. The northern porch of the mosque has three half-arches on three sides, connected to the sahn by the fourth half-arch.

=== Orsi: Persian stained glass ===
Although stained glass is popular in churches, the earliest discovered was in Syria from the 7th century CE. There is evidence of techniques and recipes for obtaining stained glass by the Persian chemist Jabir ibn Hayyan in his book Kitab al-Durra al-maknuna (transl. The Book of the Hidden Pearl) published in the 8th century. Orsi windows are windows made of a mixture of wood and colorful glass during the Safavid and Qajar eras. Orsi differs from stained glass used in many churches and Ottoman mosques which serve as illuminated images rather than a source of light. Light is a major feature in many mosques considering it being a major symbol of God in Islam. This is mentioned in the Quran:

"Allah is the light of the heavens and the earth."

— The Qur'an 24:35

== Gallery ==
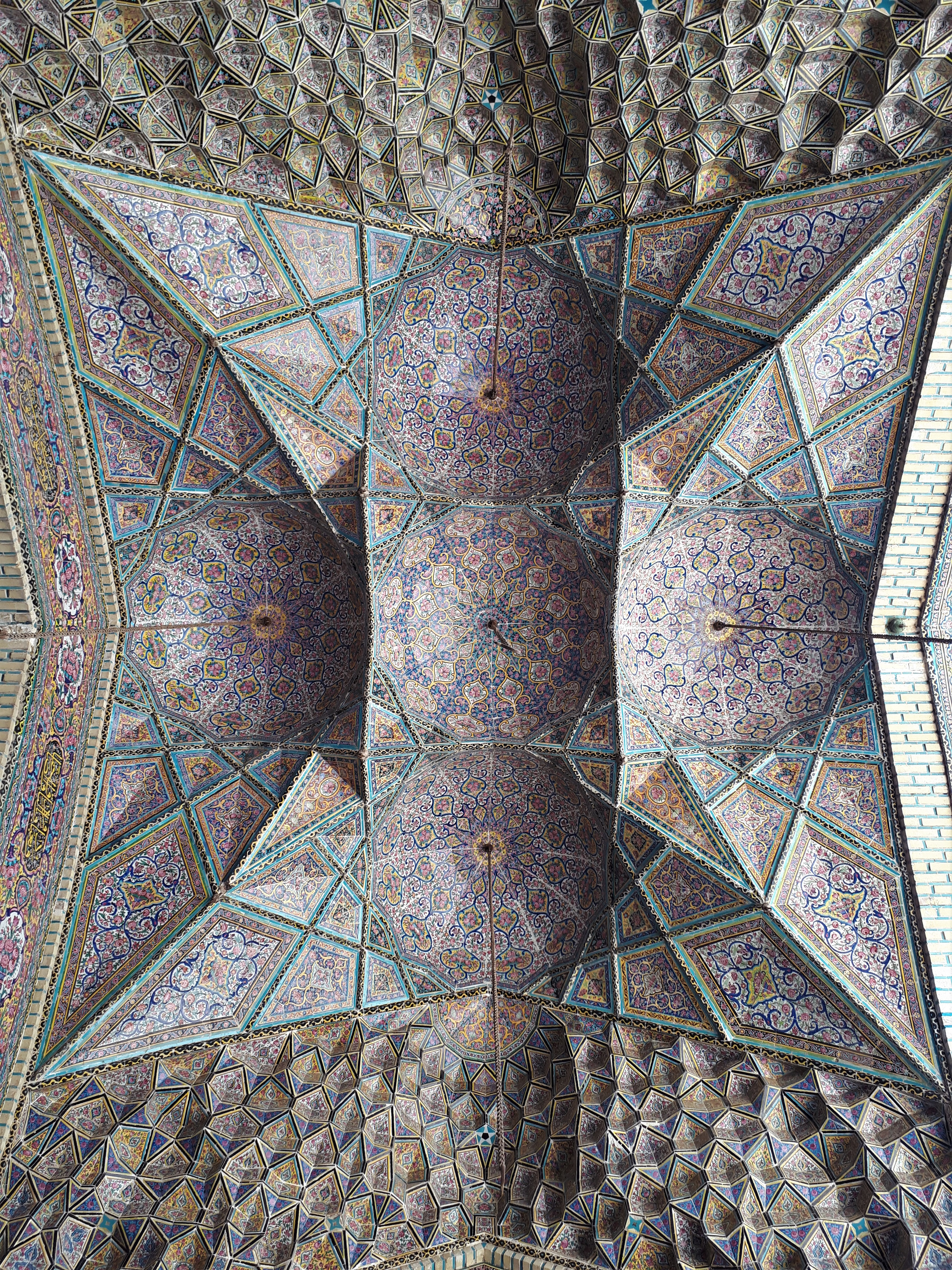
The mosque ceiling

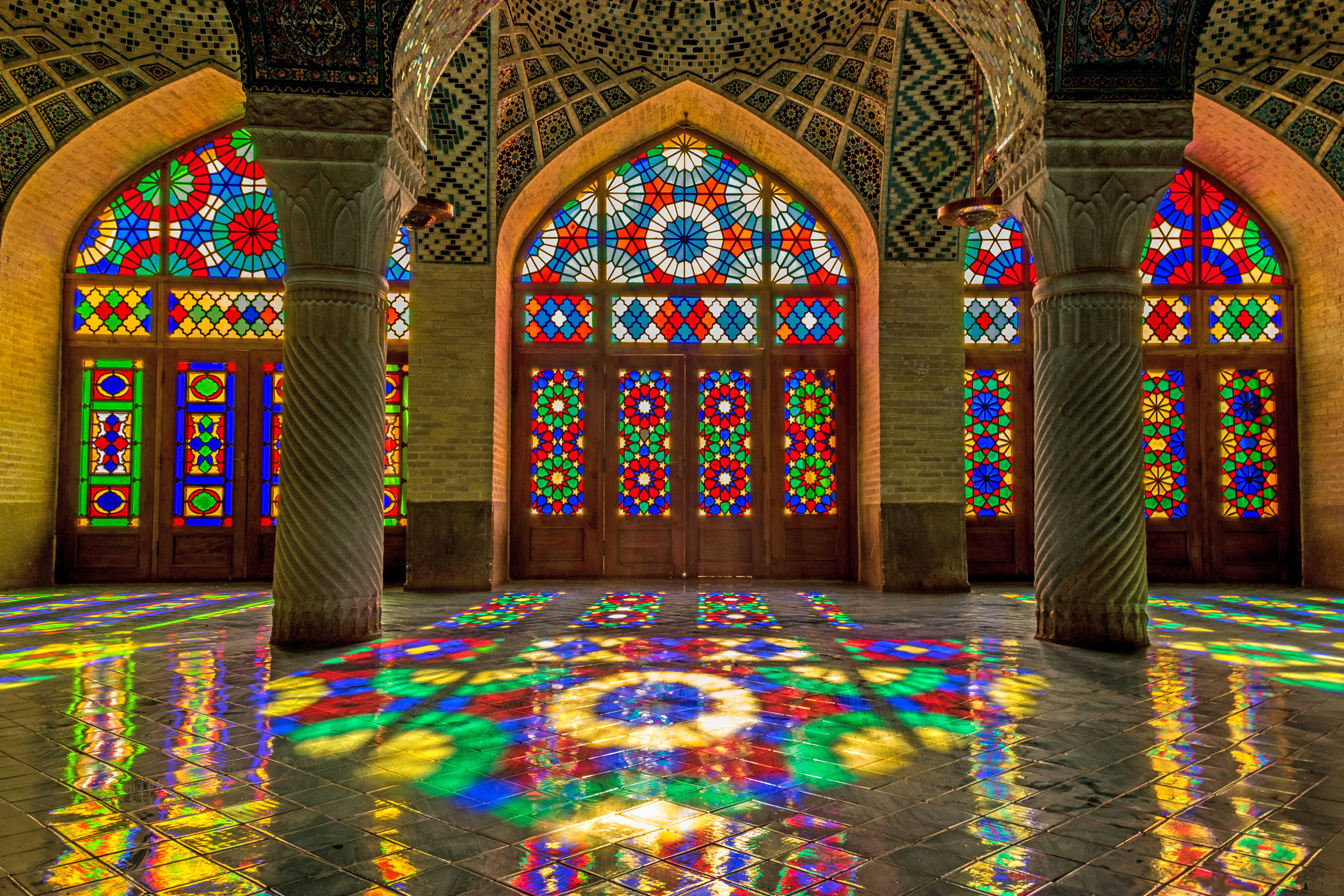
Winter prayer hall

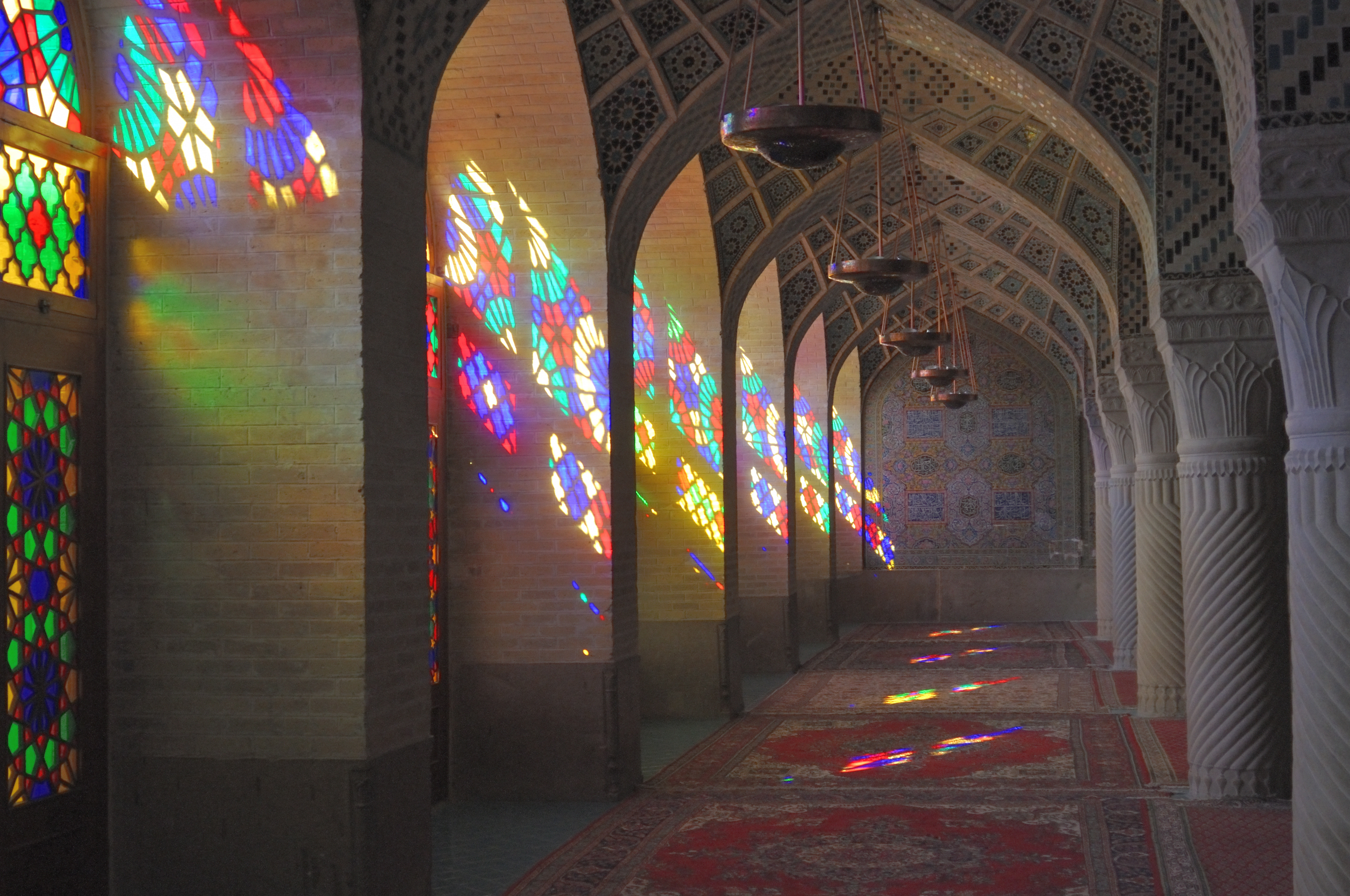
Winter prayer hall

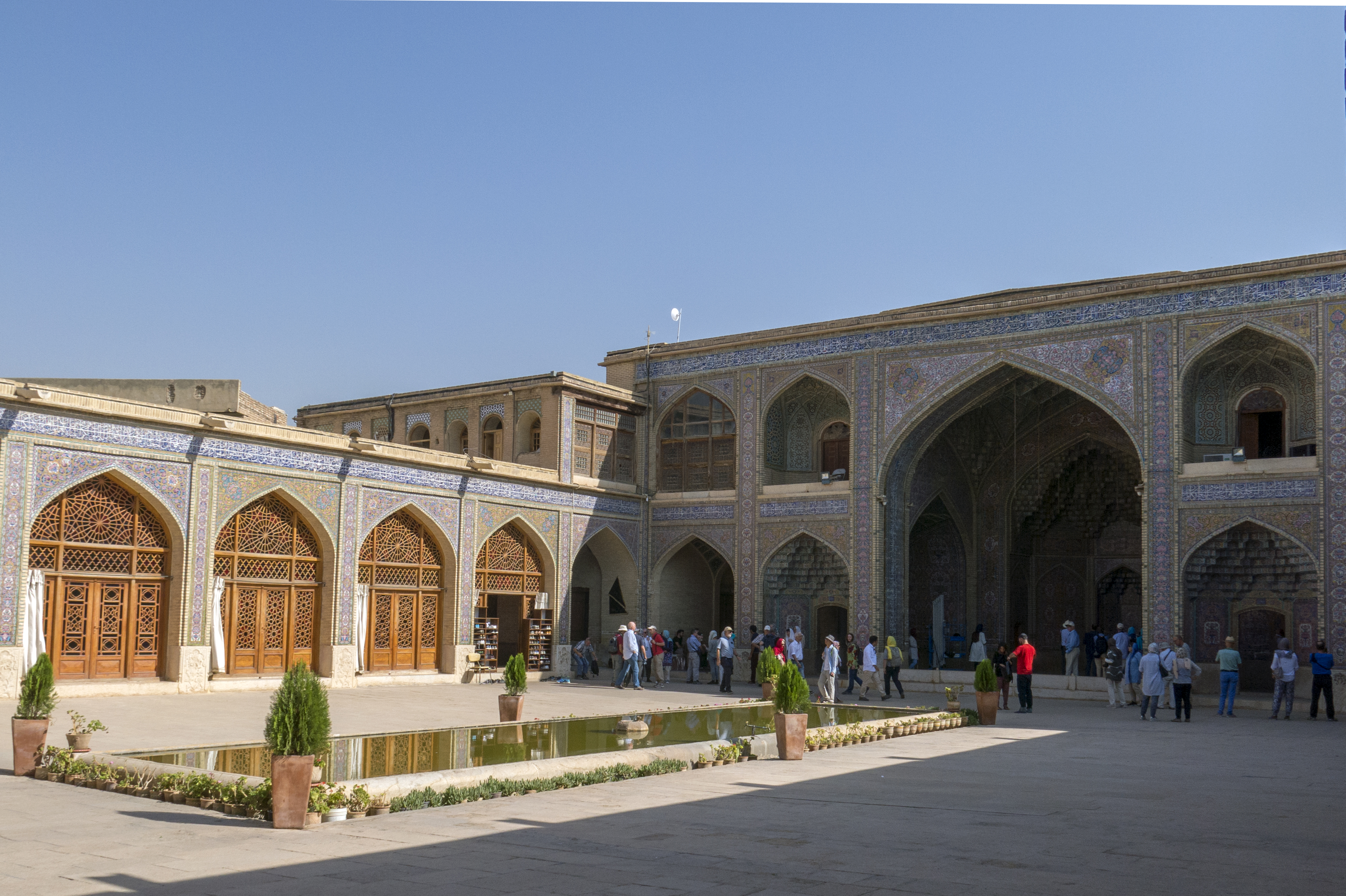
Exterior of the mosque

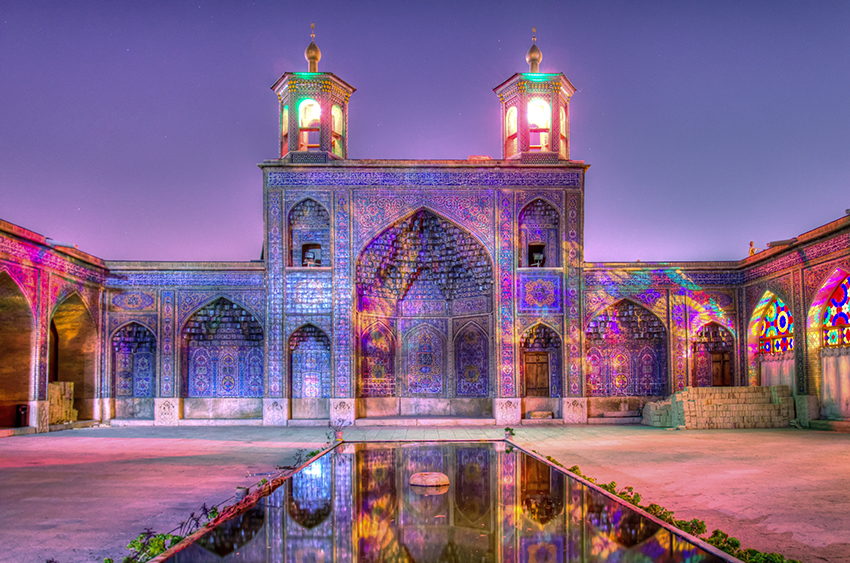
Exterior of the mosque at night

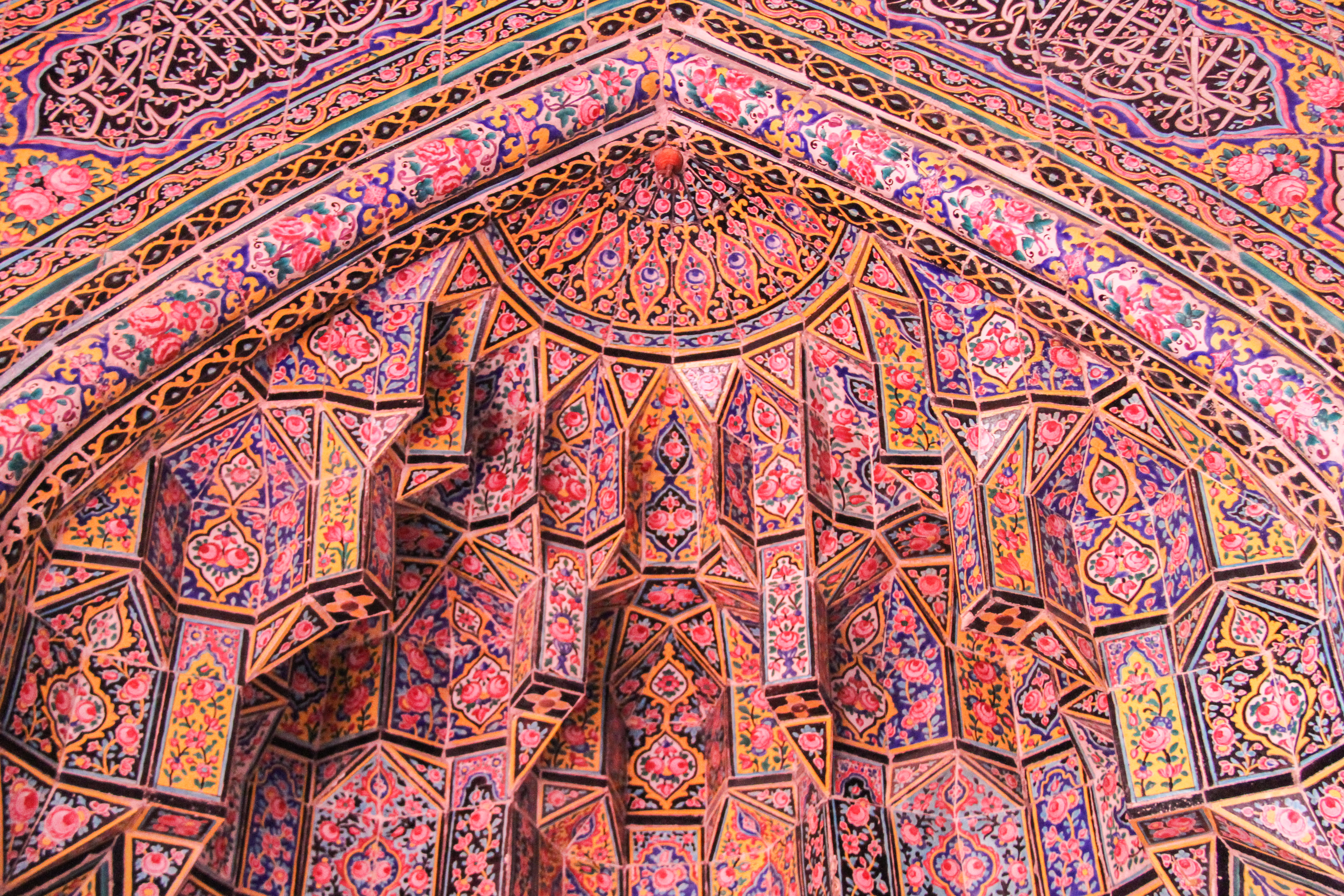
Muqarnas of the mosque

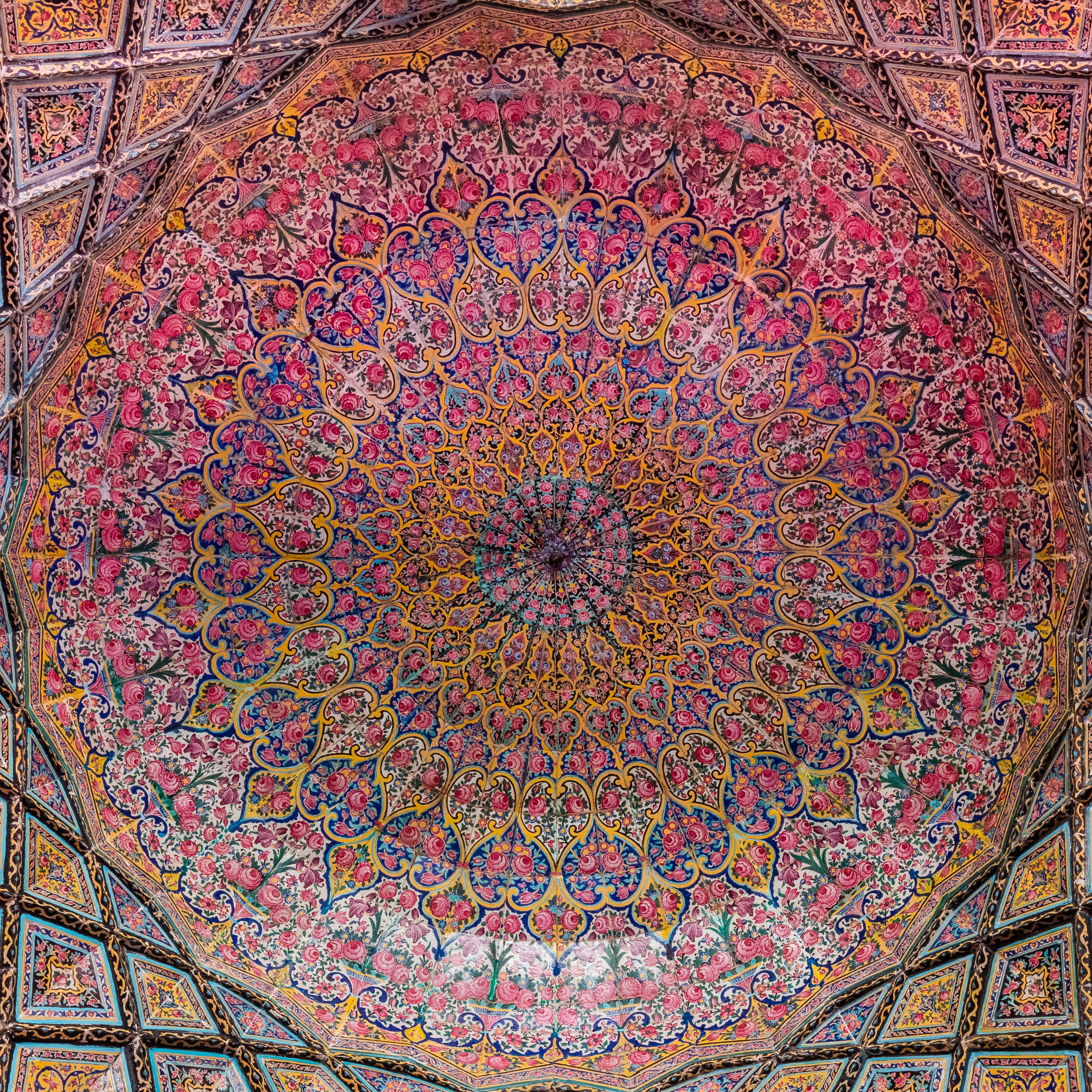
Ceiling of the winter prayer hall

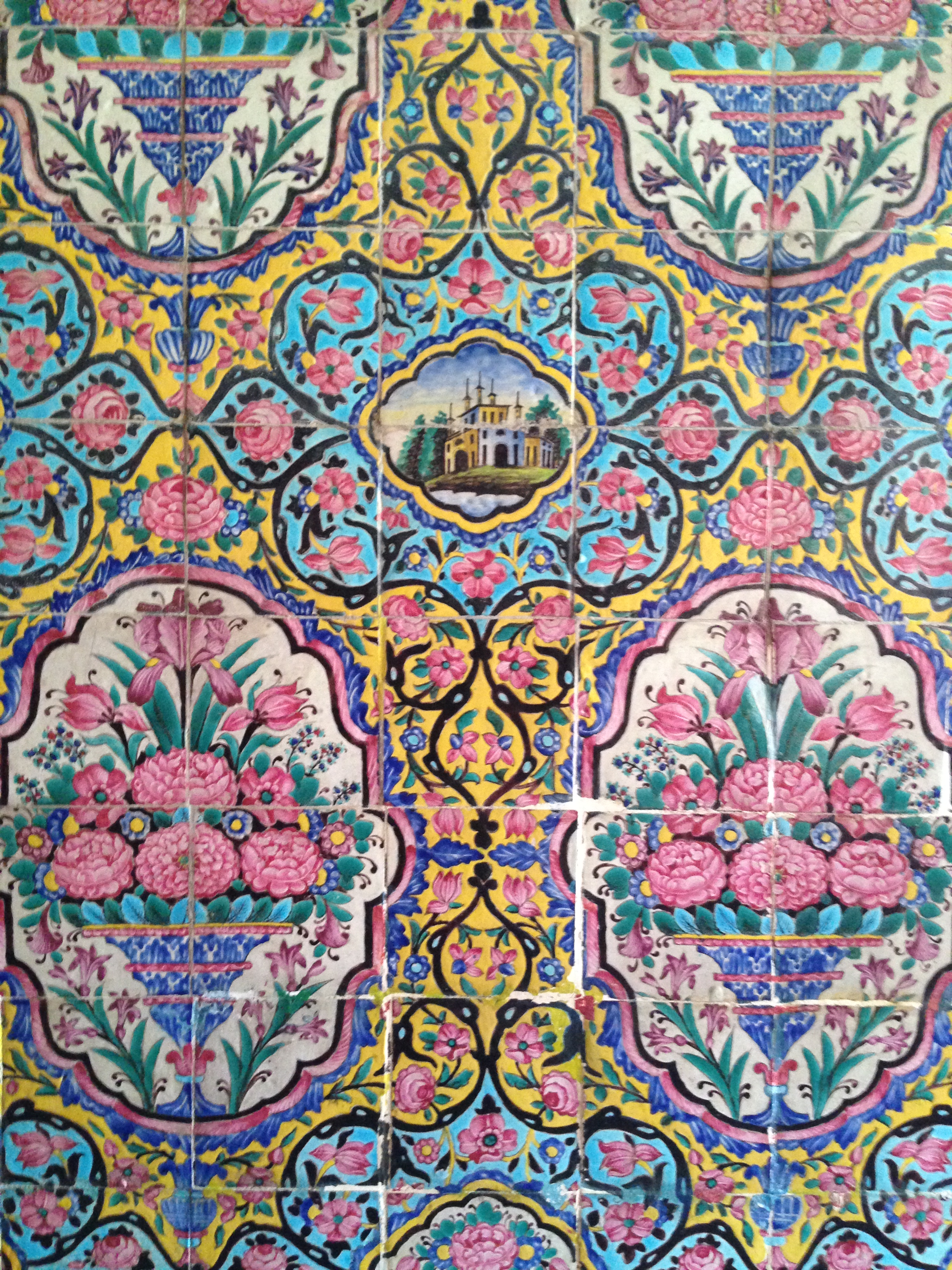
Decoration of the mosque

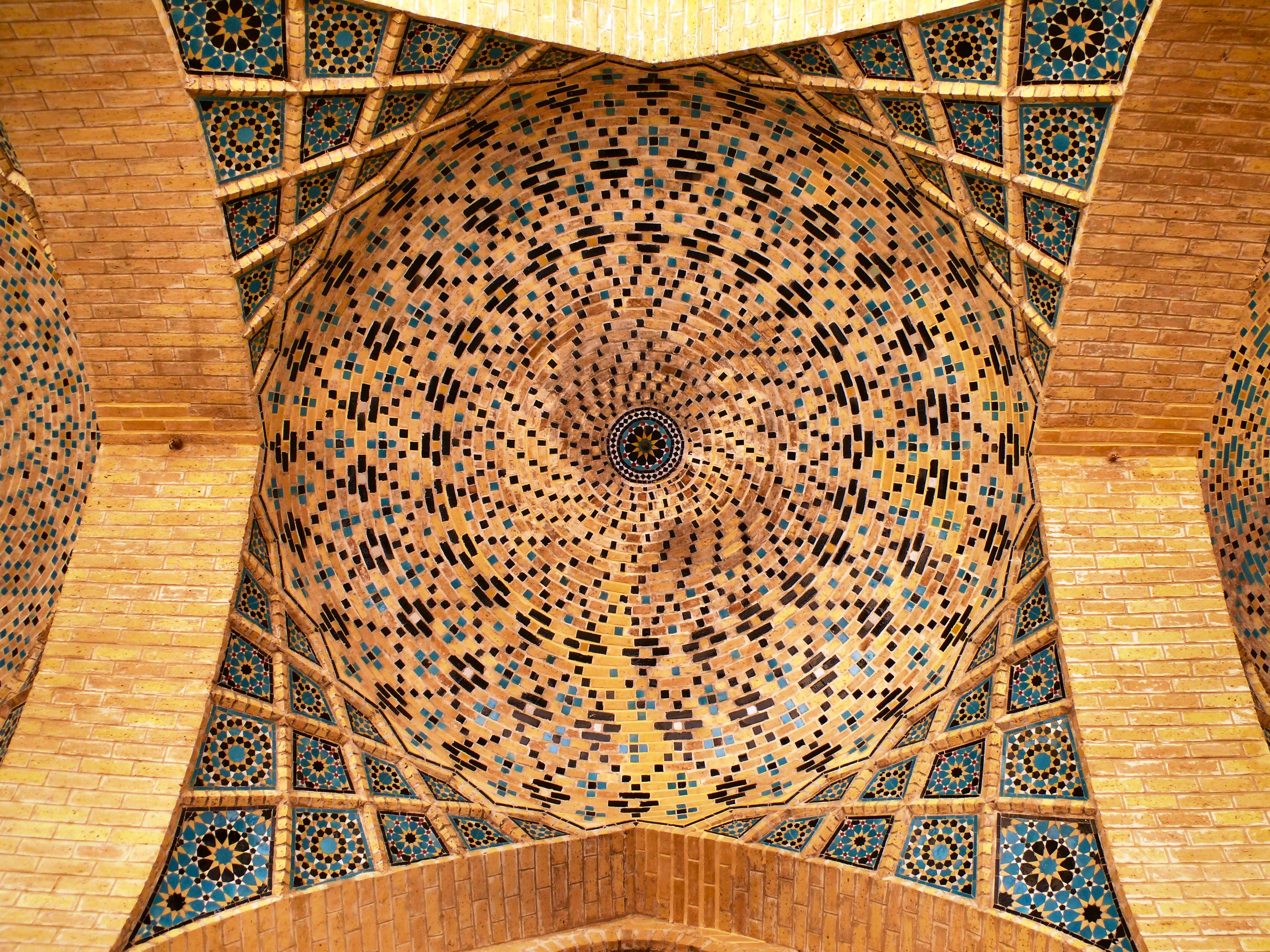
Mosaic dome interior

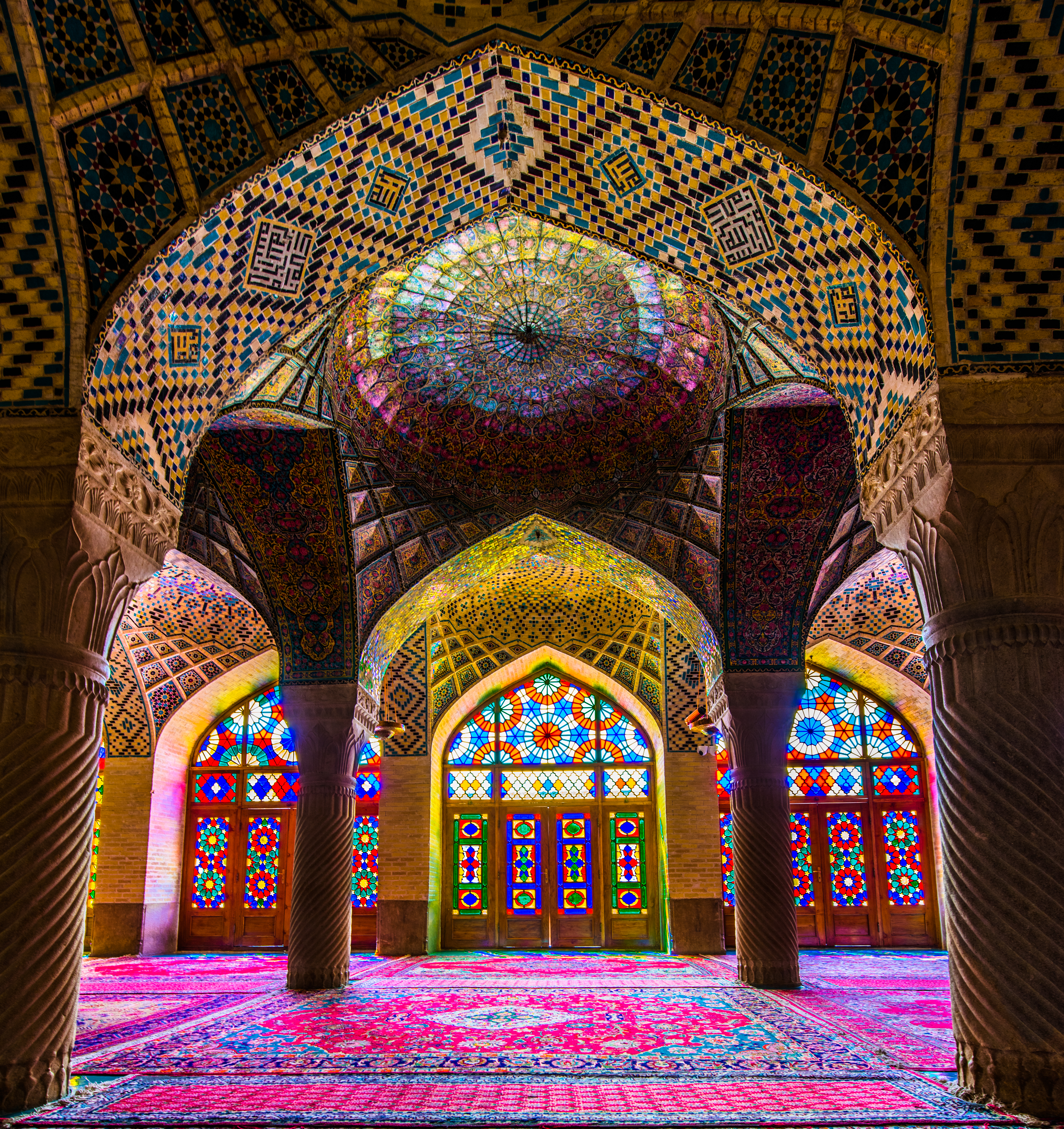
Interior

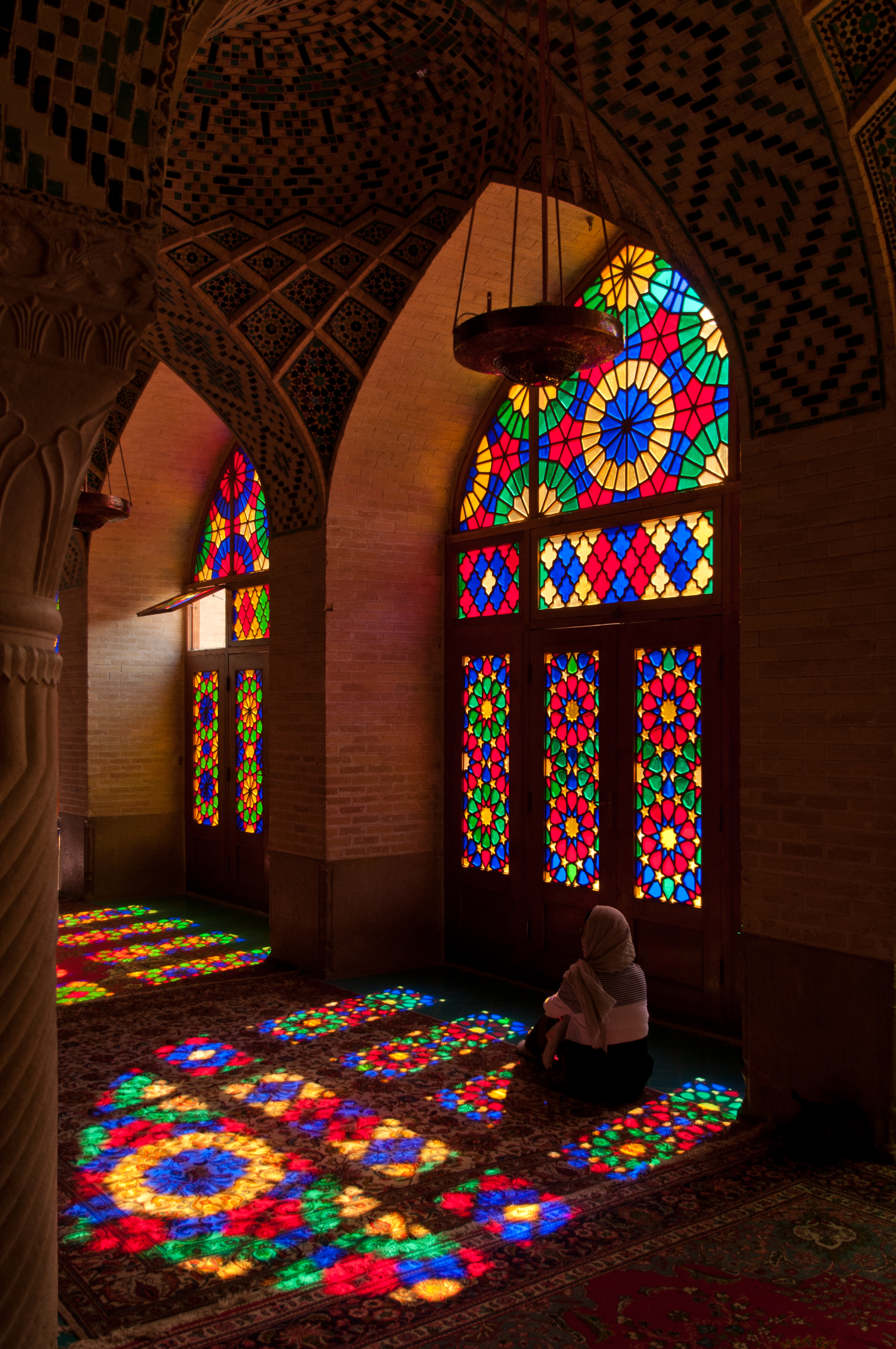
Winter prayer hall interior

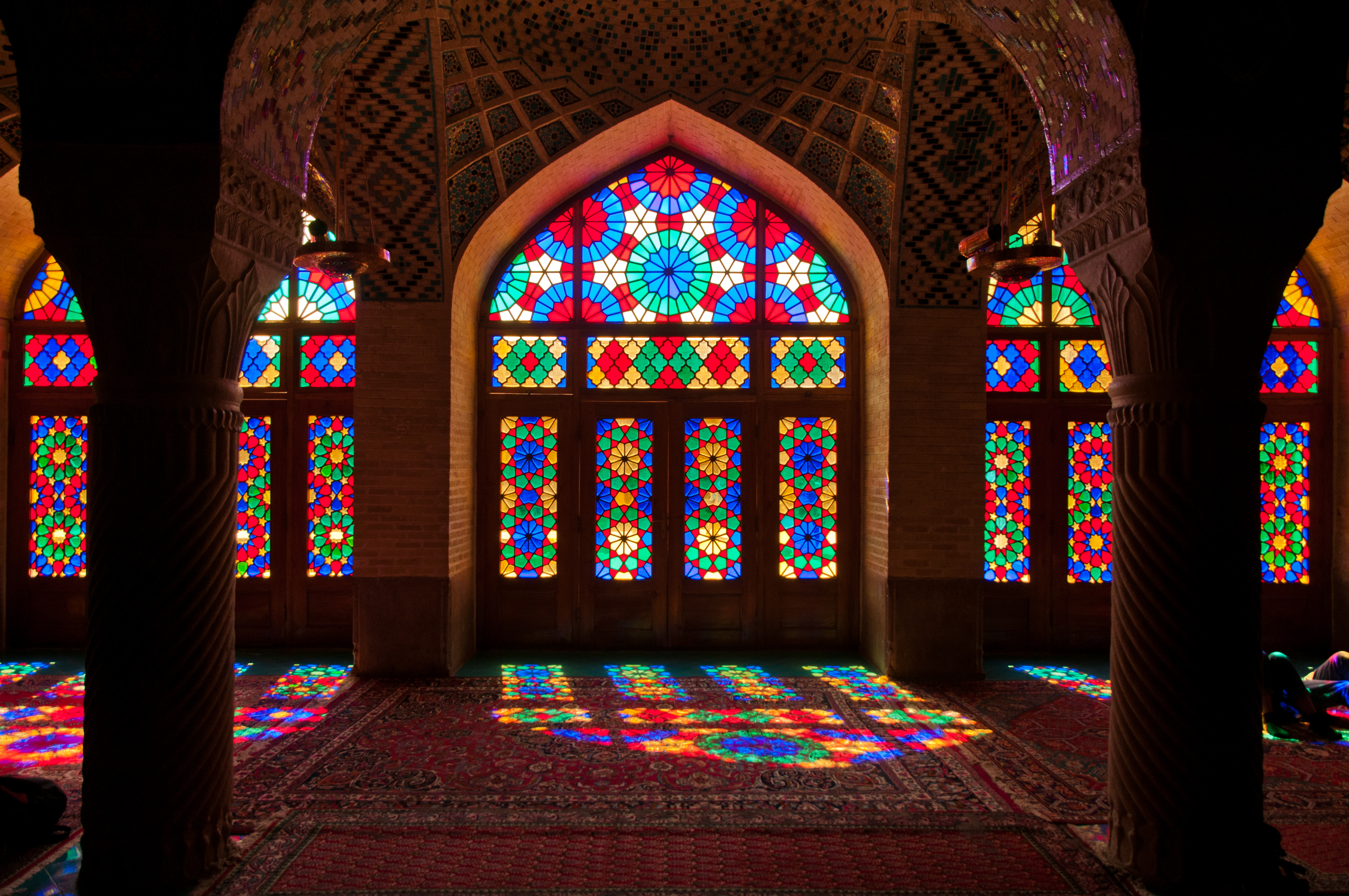
Winter prayer hall interior

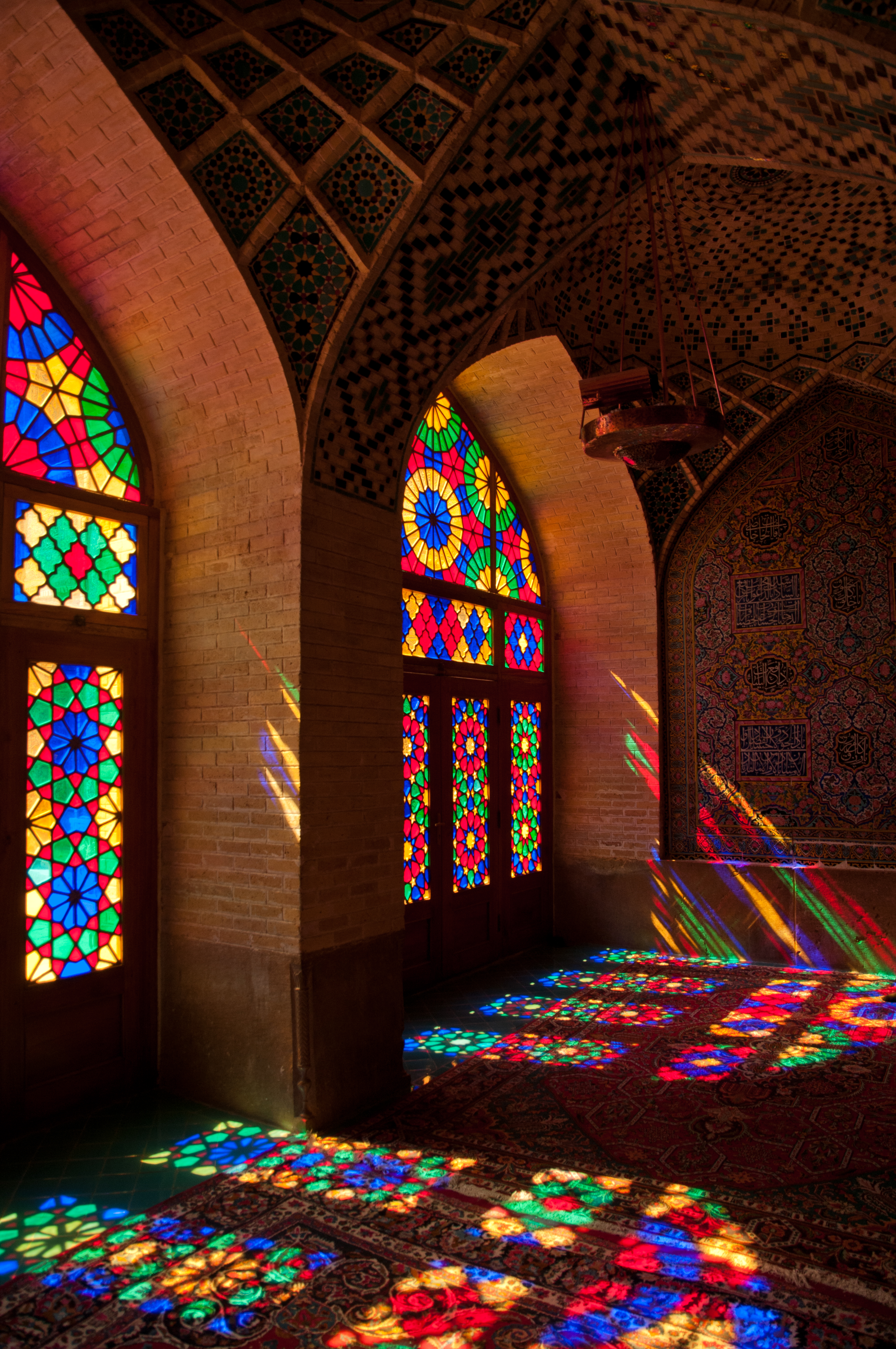
Winter prayer hall interior

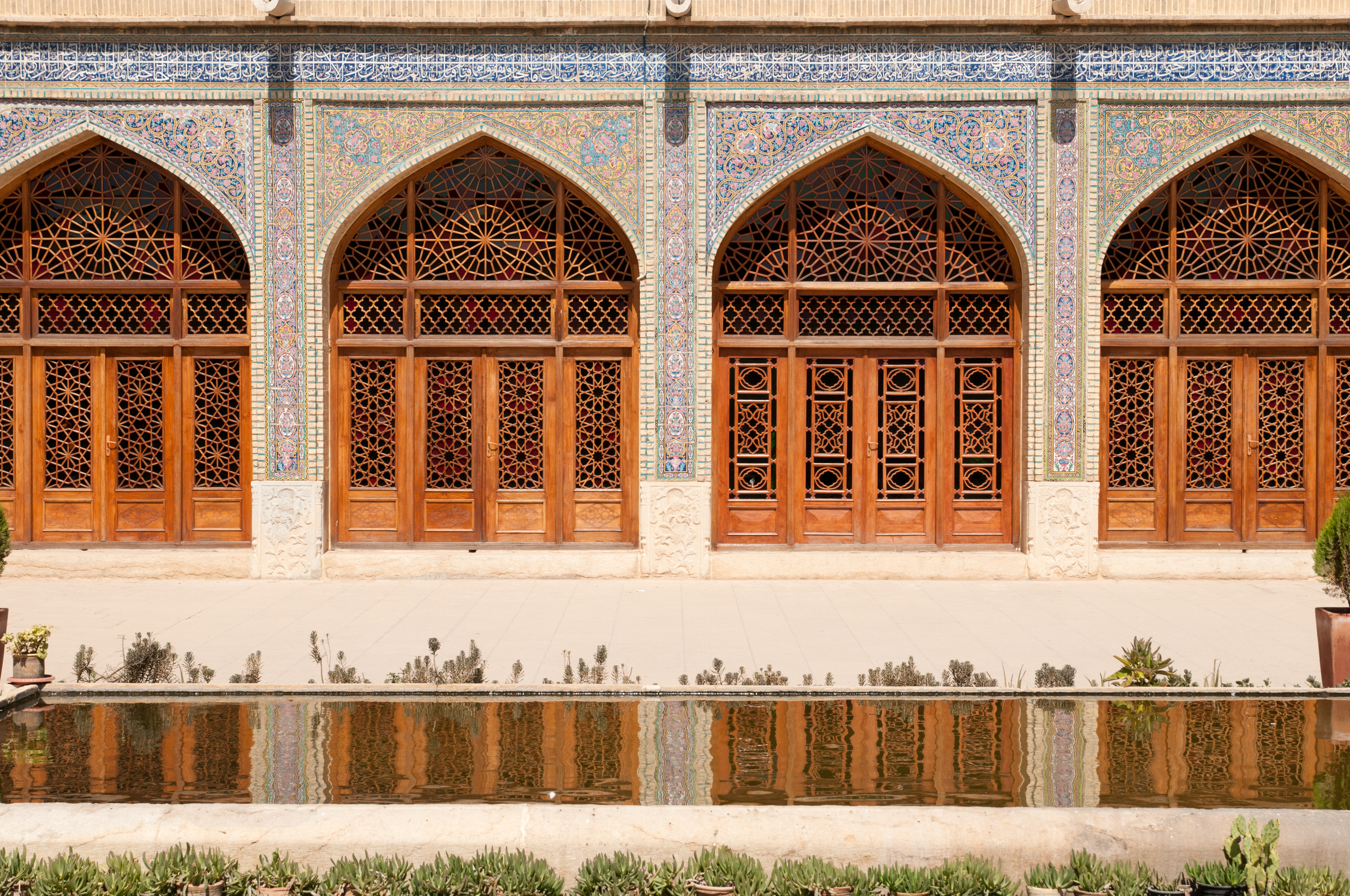
Winter prayer hall exterior

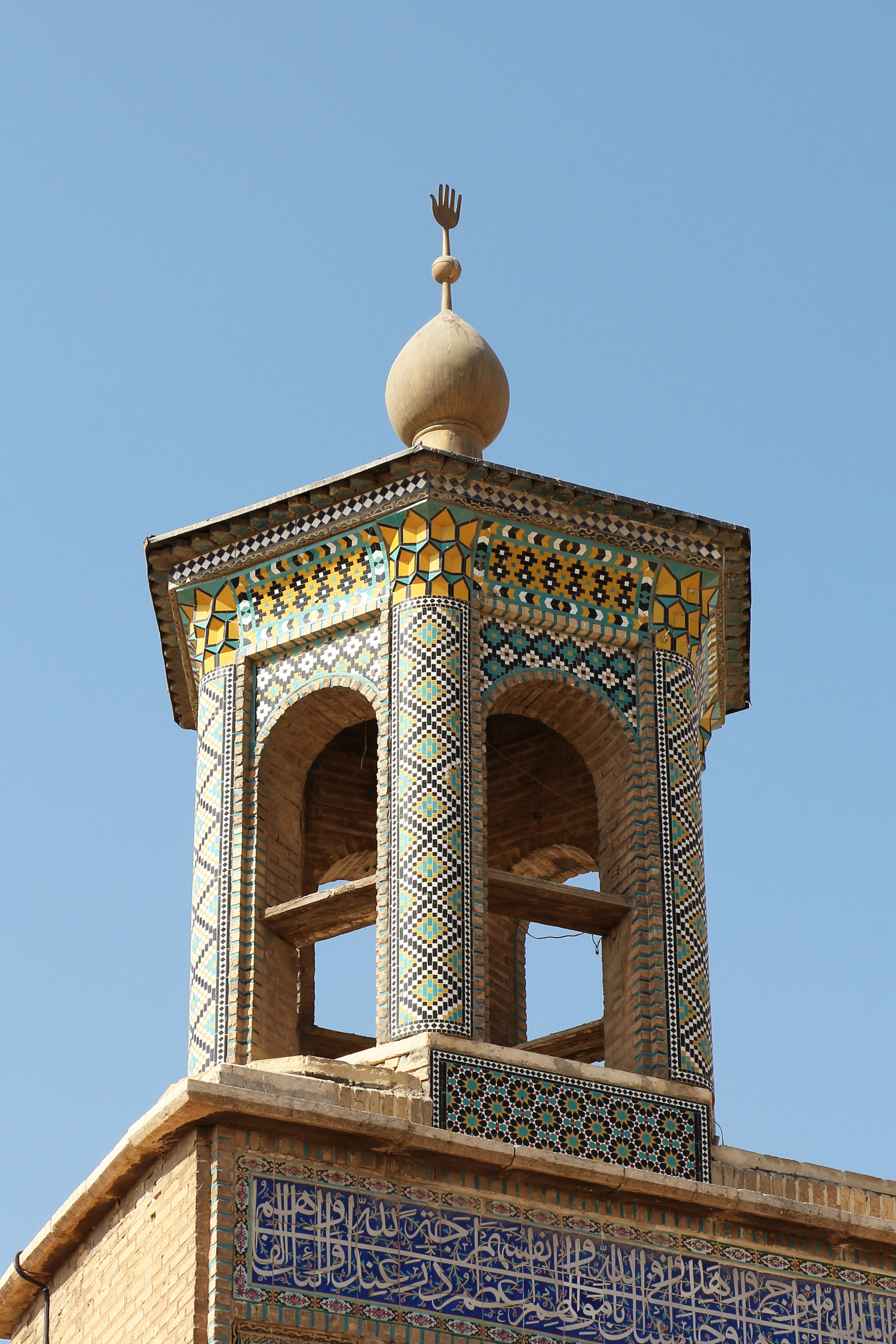
Turret-style minaret

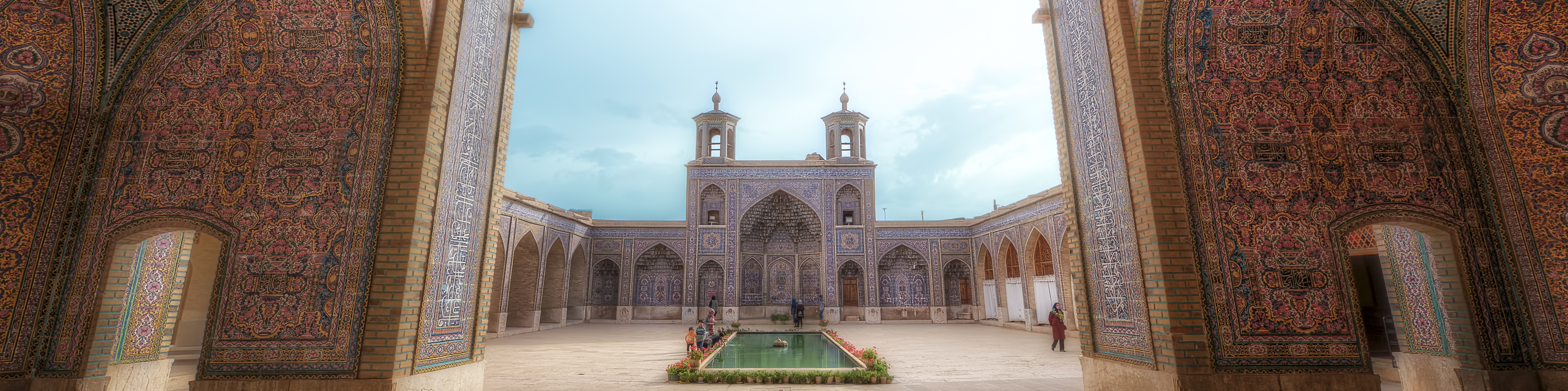
Panoramic exterior view.

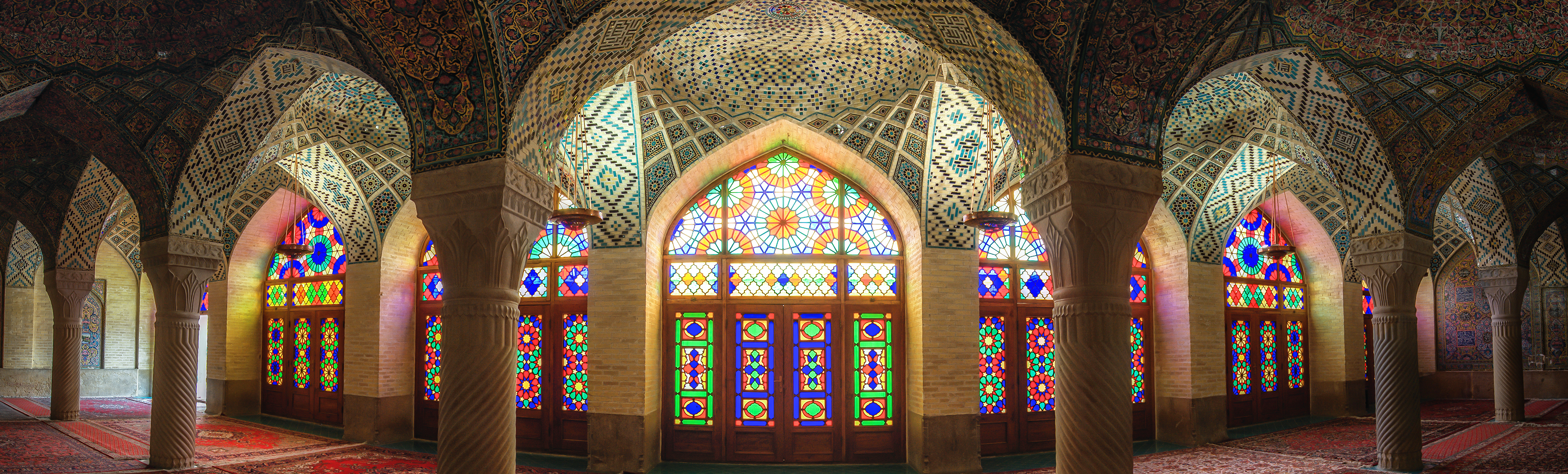
Panoramic interior view.

== See also ==
- Shia Islam in Iran
- List of mosques in Iran
- Architecture of Iran
