= Qavam family =

Iranian aristocratic family

The Ghavam (Qavam) family (Persian: خاندان قوام شیرازی) was an Iranian aristocratic family during the Qajar era (1785–1925). They were descendants of Hajji Ebrahim Shirazi, kalantar of Shiraz. British secret documents and Naser al-Din Shah Qajar believed that the family was Jewish. Due to the family's wealth and political power, it was often said that in Shiraz "before Reza Shah, Qavams were Shah here". The surname Ghavam is borrowed from the honorific title Ghavam-al-saltaneh, granted by the Qajar court, and meaning pillar or continuation of the Kingdom.

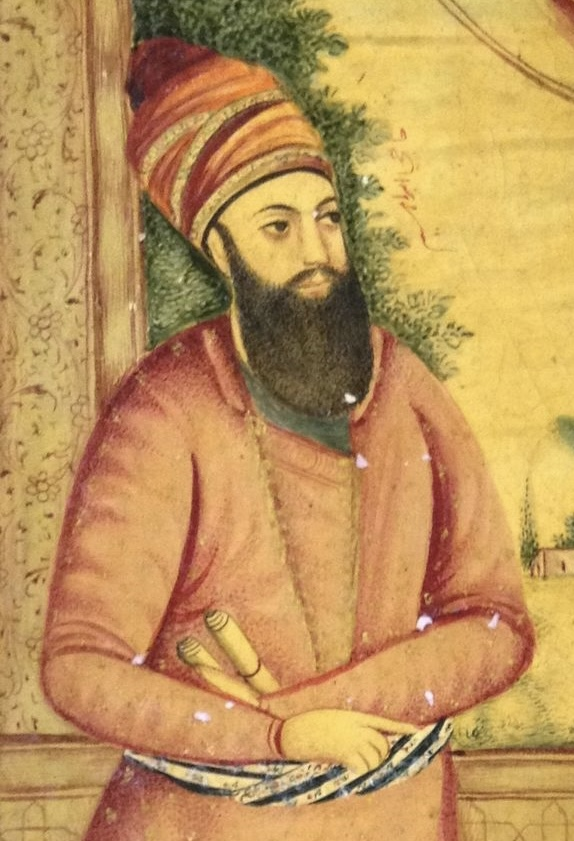
Ebrahim Shirazi was the first influential member of the family.

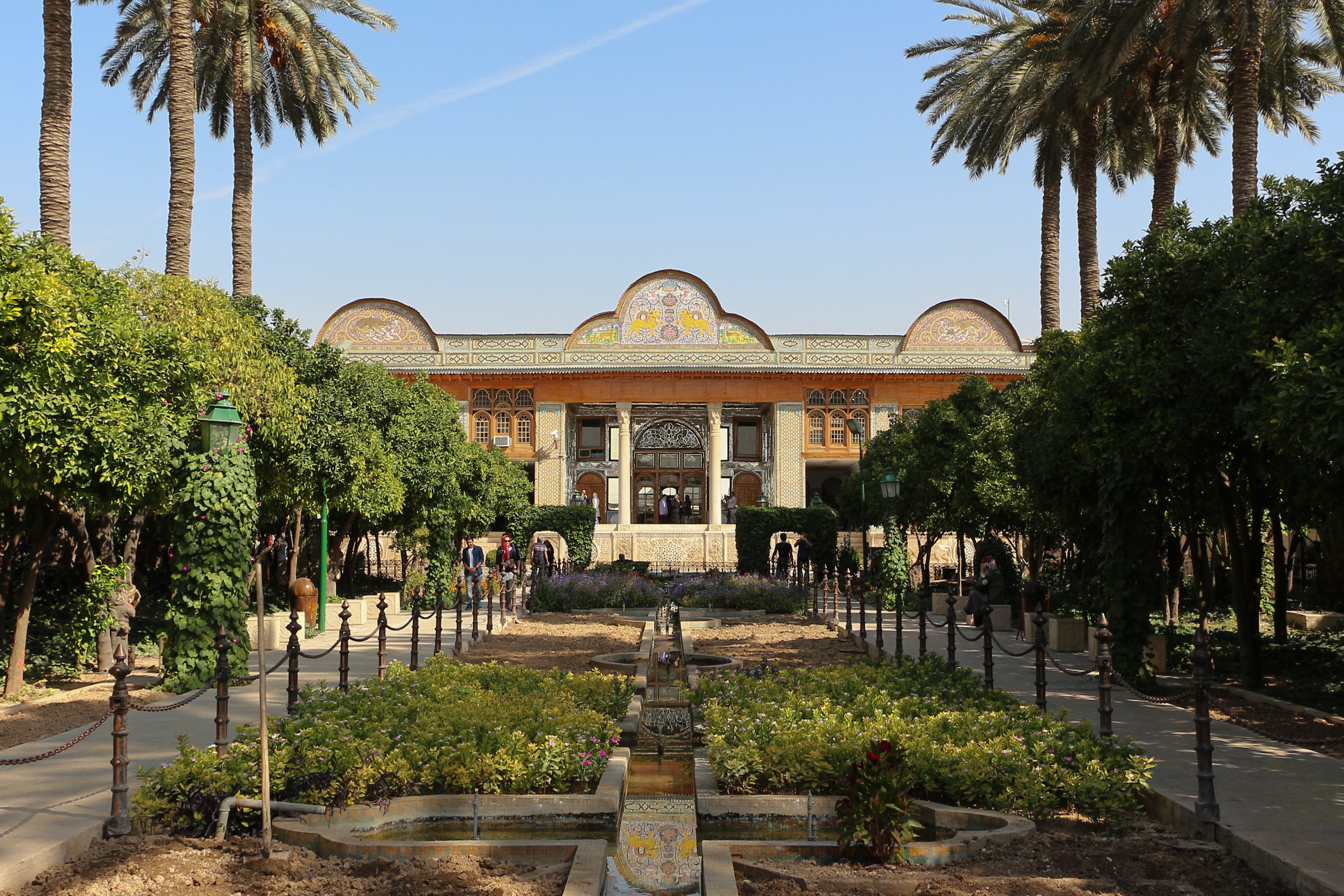
Qavam house in Shiraz built in the 19th century.

== Early years ==
The Ghavam family traces its ancestry to Hajj Ghavam ol Din, a 14th-century Vizier, and a contemporary of Hafez, who is mentioned in his poems. Local tradition portrays the family as Jewish. This claim was confirmed in secret British memoirs of 1890s called Who's Who in Iran.

The first member of the family to reach political influence was Hajj Ebrahim Kalantar Shirazi. He was a Vizier and Kalantar of Fars in Zand government. His decision to betray Lotf Ali Khan Zand influenced the fall of the Zand dynasty and the rise of the Qajar dynasty. Naser al-Din Shah Qajar addressed him when he met with the representatives of Alliance Israélite Universelle in Paris by saying,

I shall not forget it was a Jew, Hajj Ebrahim, who helped ascend the Qajars to the throne.

However, Fath-Ali Shah Qajar did not trust Hajj Ebrahim and had him executed in 1801. His fourth son, Ali Akbar Khan, was young and ill and was spared from Shah's revenge. He later returned to Shiraz and gained influence. He became the Kalantar of Fars by Fath Ali Shah in 1812. He was awarded the title Qavam ol-Molk (Pillar of the kingdom) in 1830, which became the family's last name. In 1864, he became the administrator of Imam Reza shrine at Mashhad. Hajj Ali Akbar Khan was survived by his fourth son Ali Mohammad Khan who also inherited the title Ghavam ol-Molk. In total five members of the family held that title before it was abolished by Reza Shah in the 1930s. Ebrahim Khan, Ghavam ol-Molk V was exiled by Reza Shah to Tehran. Fath Ali Khan, Saheb Divan, another son of first Ghavam went to Tehran in 1830 and married a daughter of Fath Ali Shah and became an influential figure in the government. He became governor of many provinces. Another son, Nasir ol-Molk, remained in Fars and served as governor of Bushehr, Lar and Bandar Abbas.

Thus the three major branches of the Qavam family are:

- Ghavams who are in Tehran and are sons and daughters of Ebrahim Ghavam
- Ghavams who are descendants of Nasir ol-Molk
- Saheb Divanis, who are descendants of Saheb Divan from Shiraz

Ebrahim Ghavam was exiled, but remained powerful. His son, Ali Qavam, married Princess Ashraf Pahlavi. However this marriage was forced upon Ashraf by Reza Shah in order to gain British favor. When Iran was invaded by the allies, Ghavam tried to distance himself from the Pahlavis. Their son Prince Shahram Pahlavi Nia was the grandson of Reza Shah Pahlavi and Ebrahim Ghavam. Ali Ghavam later divorced Ashraf Pahlavi and married a sister of Asadollad Alam.

Their properties included Ghavam Husseinya, Afif-Abad Garden, Delgosha Garden, Kalantar Garden, Biglerbeigi Garden, Zenat-ol-Molok House, and Narenjestan Qavam. Nasir-ol-Molk Mosque in Shiraz was commissioned by them.

== See also ==
- Ebrahim Kalantar Shirazi
- Mirza Abolhassan Khan Ilchi
