= Saadi Street (Shiraz) =

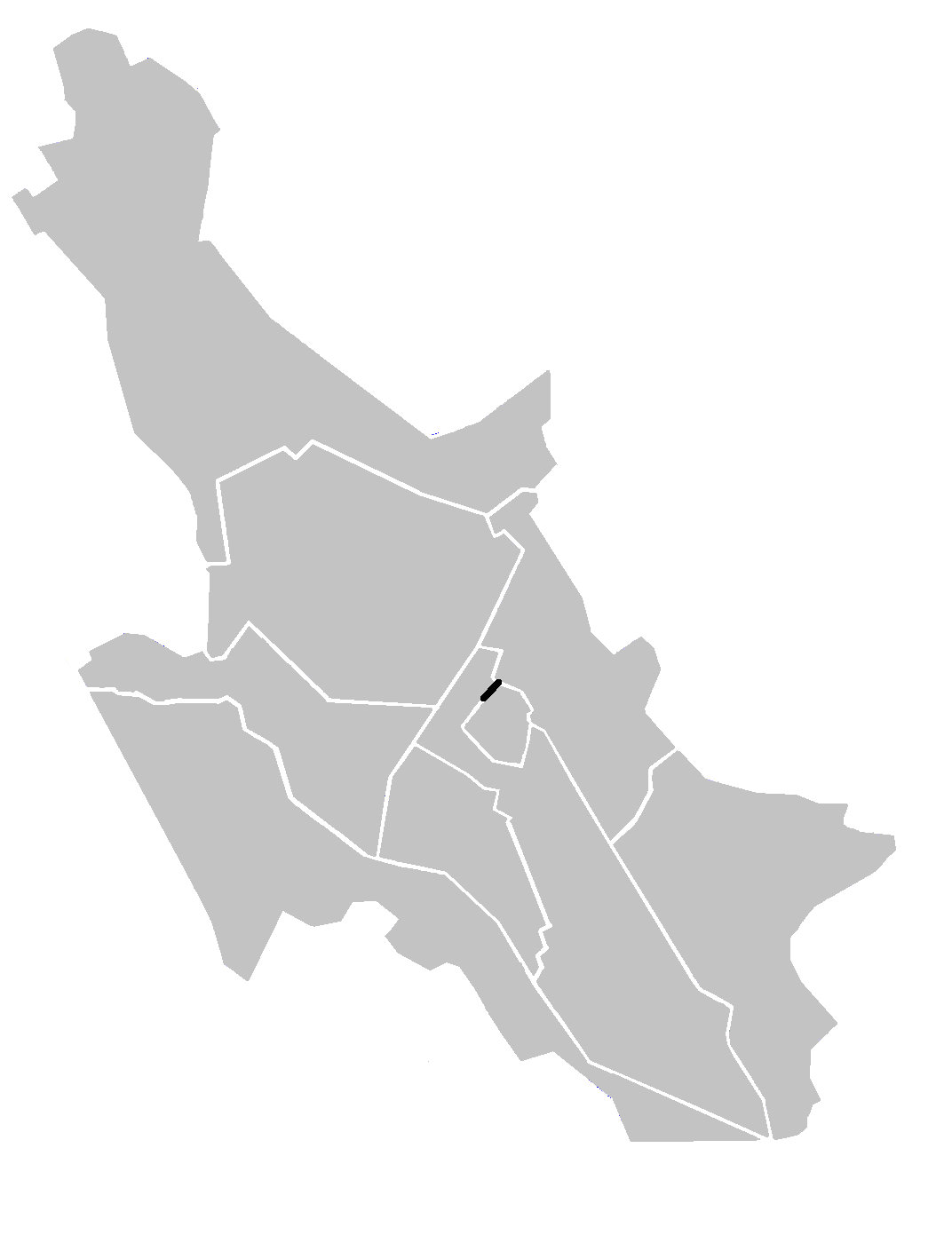
- Native name: خیابان سعدی (Persian)
- Length: 0.50 km (0.31 mi)
- Location: Shiraz, Fars; Iran
- From: Zand Boulevard; Towhid (Dariush) Street
- To: Ferdowsi Street

Saadi Street (Persian: خیابان سعدی) is a street in central part of Shiraz, Iran.

From South to North
Zand Intersection	Zand Boulevard; Towhid (Dariush) Street
	Izadi Street
	Maktabi Street
	Davari Street
	Ferdowsi Street
From North to South
