= Valiasr Square (Shiraz) =

Main square in Shiraz, Fars, Iran

Coordinates: 29.6082°N 52.5587°E

Valiasr Square (Persian: میدان (فلکه) ولیعصر) is one of the main squares in Shiraz, Fars, Iran. Valiasr Square is the terminus of Salman Farsi (Pirnia) Boulevard, Zand Boulevard and Modares Boulevard. There is an urban bus terminal and a subway station which is under construction in this square.

== Transportation ==
=== Streets ===
- Modares Boulevard
- Salman Farsi (Pirnia) Boulevard
- Zand Boulevard

=== Buses ===
- Route 10
- Route 17
- Route 20
- Route 51
- Route 70
- Route 71
- Route 72
- Route 76
- Route 77
- Route 79
- Route 97
- Route 98

=== Metro ===
- Valiasr Metro Station
