= Zand Boulevard =

Boulevard in Shiraz, Iran

Karim Khan Zand Boulevard
- Interactive map of Karim Khan Zand Boulevard
- Native name: بلوار کریم خان زند (Persian)
- Length: 4.7 km (2.9 mi)
- Location: Shiraz, Fars
- East end: Valiasr Square
- West end: Namazi Square

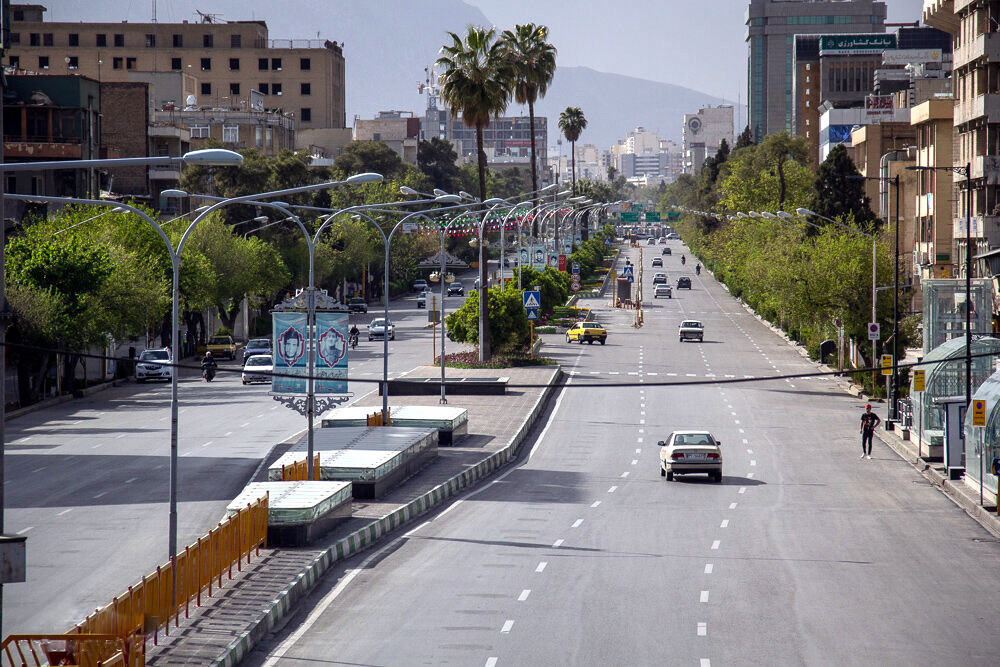

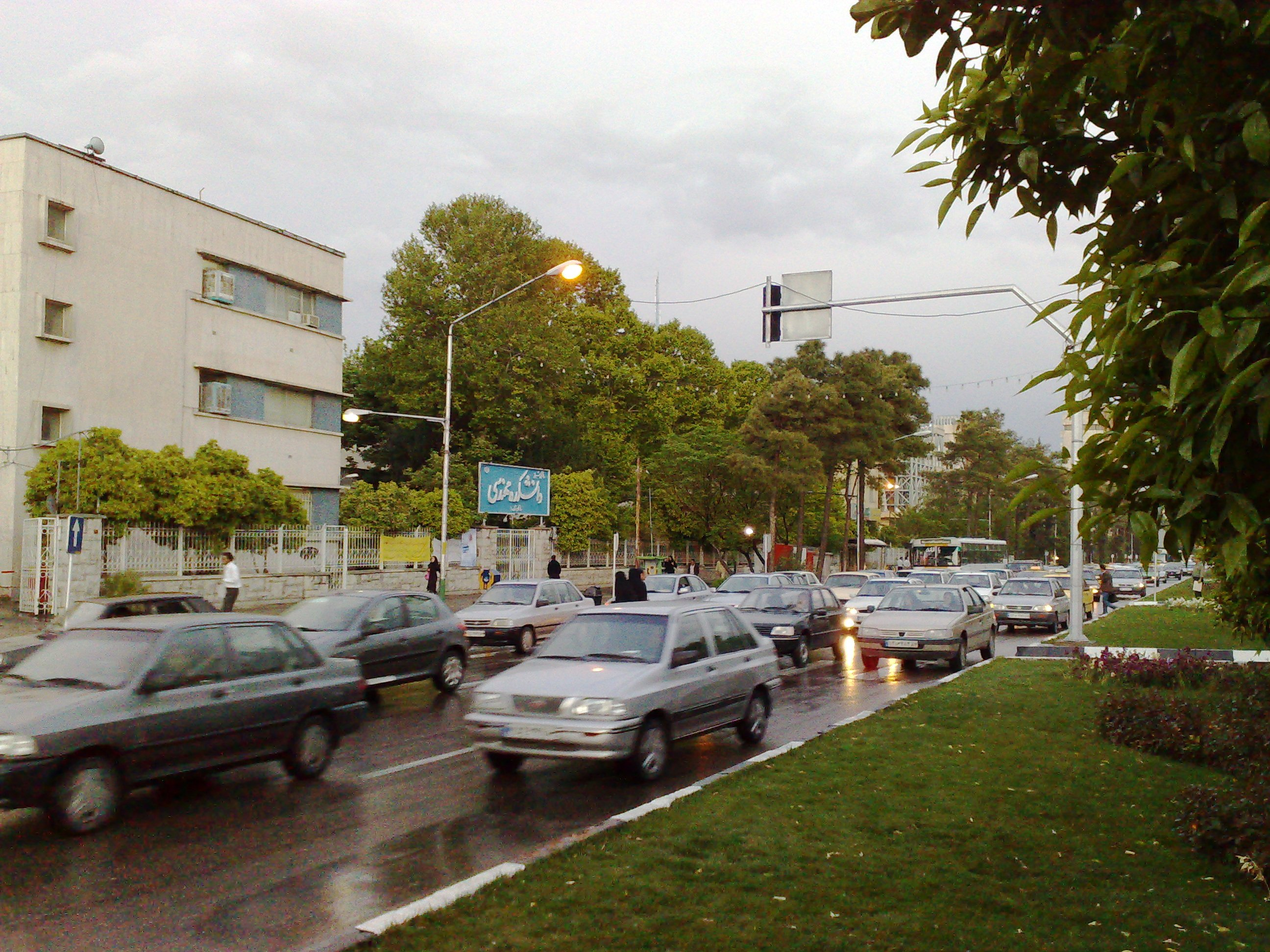

Karim Khan Zand Boulevard is a boulevard in central Shiraz, Iran connecting Valiasr Square to Namazi Square. It passes Shahrdari Square and Emam Hossein (Setad) Square.

From East to West
Valiasr Square	Modares Boulevard; Salman Farsi (Pirnia) Boulevard; Takhti Street
Valiasr Metro Station
	Zeynabieh Boulevard; Keshavarz Street
Vakilorroaya Metro Station
Zand Underpass
Shahrdari Square	Hejrat Street; Piruzi Street
Zand Intersection	Towhid (Dariush) Street; Sa'adi Street
Zandiyeh Metro Station
	Rudaki Street
	Anvari Street
	Khayyam Street
Emam Hossein (Setad) Square	Azadi Boulevard; Enqelab-e Eslami Street
Imam Hossein Metro Station
	Asadabadi (Pustchi) Street
	Faqihi (Suratgar) Street
	7 Tir (20 Metri) Street
	Neshat Street
	Felestin (Baghshah) Street
Namazi Metro Station; Namazi Bus Terminal
Namazi Square	Daneshjoo Boulevard; Mollasadra Street
From West to East
