= Shahrdari Square (Shiraz) =

Square in Shiraz, Iran

Shahrdari (Shohada) Square (Persian: میدان شهرداری) is a square in Shiraz, Iran where Hejrat Street, Piruzi Street and Zand Boulevard meet. The Shiraz Municipality building, Arg of Karim Khan, and the main court of Shiraz are near this location.

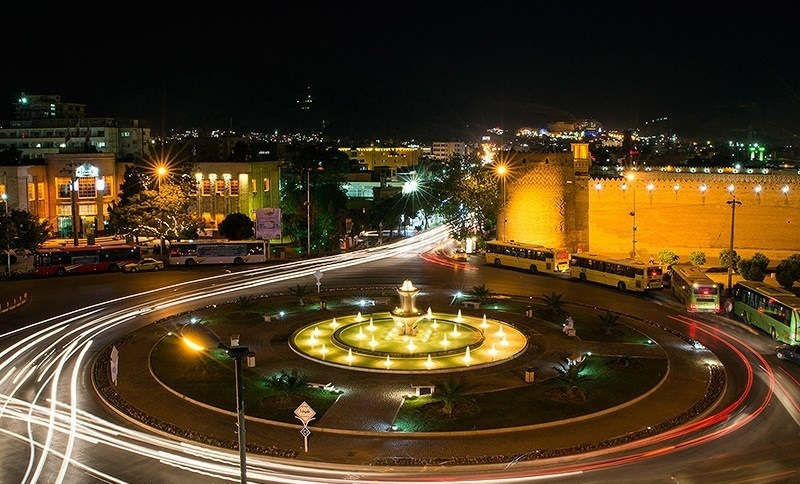

== Transportation ==
=== Streets ===
- Zand Boulevard
- Hejrat Street
- Piruzi Street

=== Buses ===
- Route 1
- Route 2
- Route 14
- Route 35
