= Piruzi Street (Shiraz) =

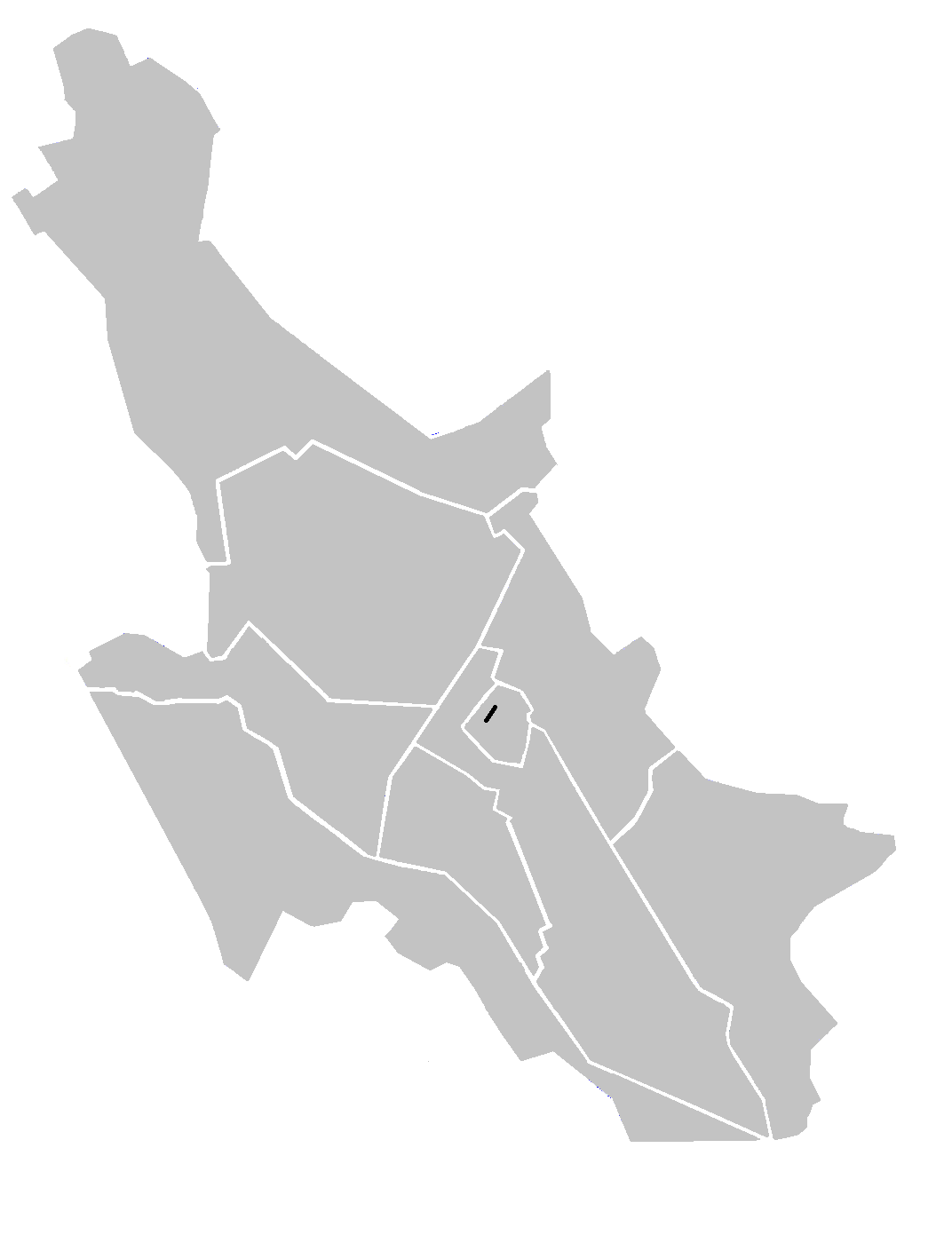
- Native name: خیابان پیروزی (نمازی) (Persian)
- Length: 0.38 km (0.24 mi)
- Location: Shiraz, Fars
- From: Shahrdari Square
- To: Shahid Dastgheib Boulevard; Lotf Ali Khan Street

Piruzi Street (Persian: خیابان پیروزی) locally known as Namazi Street (Persian: خیابان نمازی) is a street in central part of Shiraz.

From North to South
Shahrdari Square	Zand Boulevard; Hejrat Street
	Farhang Street
Namazi Intersection	Shahid Dastgheib Boulevard; Lotf Ali Khan Street
From South to North
