= Shiraz Metro =

Rapid transit system in Shiraz, Iran

Shiraz Metro SURO
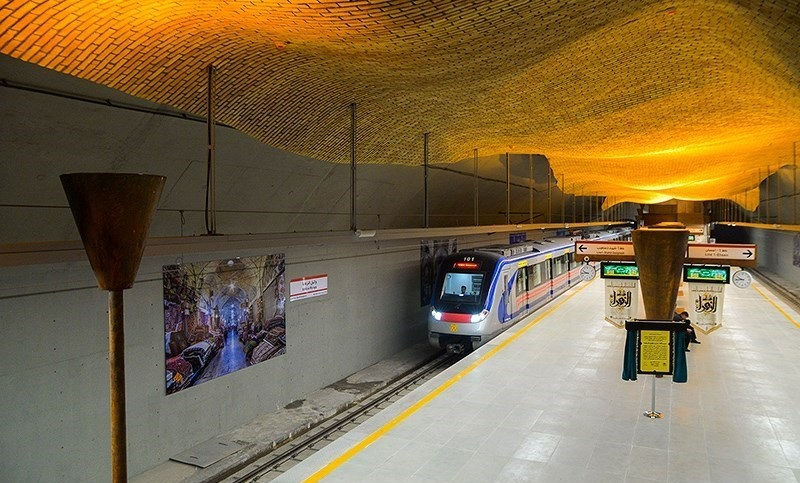

Overview
- Owner: Shiraz Municipality
- Locale: Shiraz, Fars, Iran
- Transit type: Rapid transit
- Number of lines: 6 (2 active)
- Number of stations: 27
- Daily ridership: 100,000 (2018) 25,000 (During Covid-2020)
- Annual ridership: 18,000,000 (2018)
- Website: https://metro.shiraz.ir/

Operation
- Began operation: 11 October 2014; 12 years ago
- Operator: Shiraz Urban Railway Organization
- Number of vehicles: 14 trains
- Train length: 5-cars
- Headway: 15 minutes

Technical
- System length: 28.1 km (17.5 mi)
- Track gauge: 1,435 mm (4 ft 8 1/2 in)
- Electrification: 1.5 kV DC overhead line

The Shiraz Metro (Persian: متروی شیراز, romanized: Metro-yé Shiraz) is the rapid transit system in Shiraz, Fars, Iran, operated by Shiraz Urban Railway Organization. Construction began in 2001, and service in the first line officially commenced on 11 October 2014.

== Lines ==
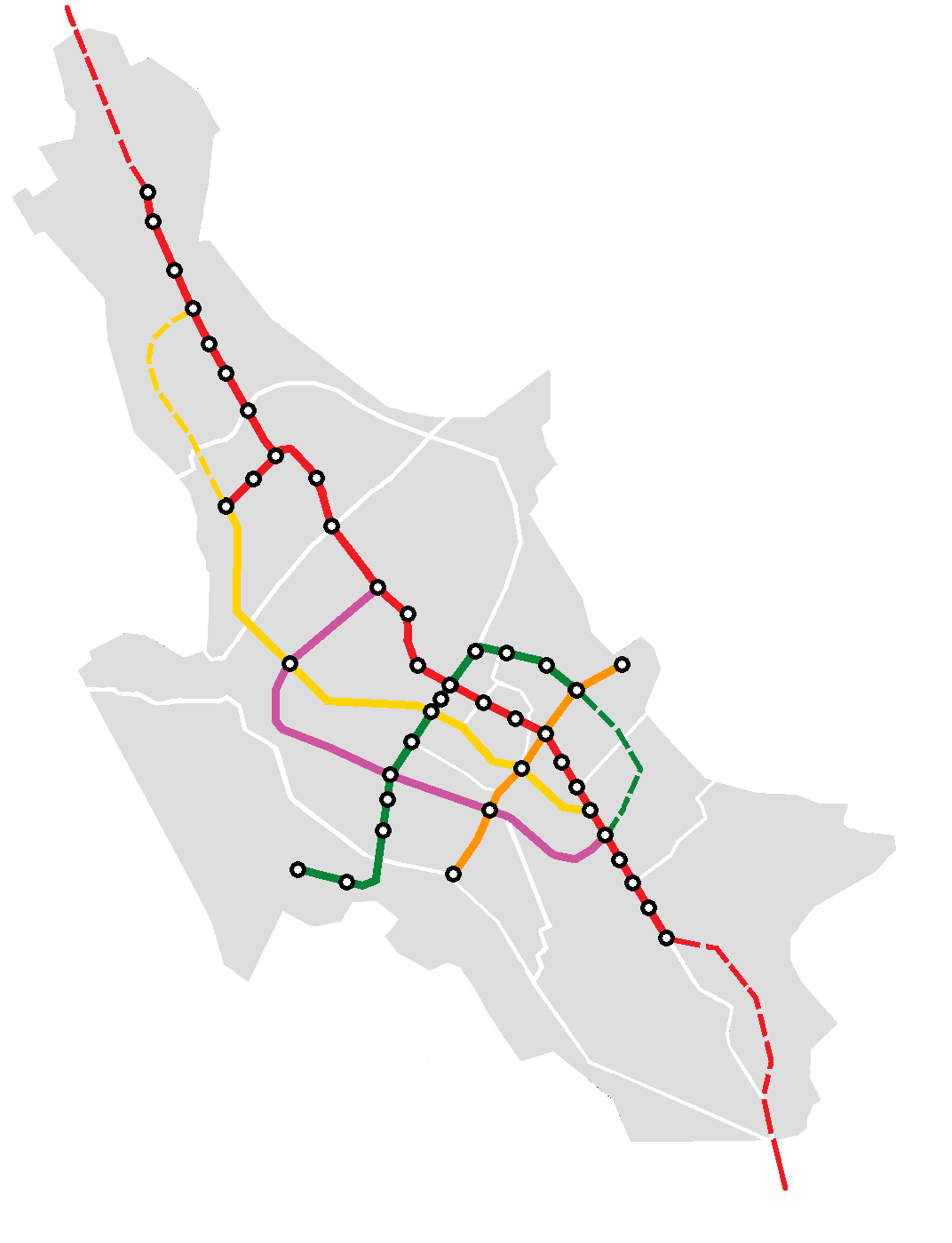
Planned network

The Shiraz Metro is planned to consist of 6 lines. As of 2023, Lines 1 and 2 are operating, Lines 3 and 4 are under construction, and Lines 5 and 6 are undergoing design and planning.

Line Number	Year First Opened	Expected Year of Extension	Length (km)	Total No. of Stations	Type	Condition
1	2014	2020	22.5	20	Metro	Active
2	2023	TBA	12.5	13	Metro	Active
3	TBA	TBA	10	8	Metro	Under construction
4	TBA	TBA	TBA	TBA	Metro	Under construction
5	TBA	TBA	TBA	TBA	Metro	Design phase
6	TBA	TBA	TBA	TBA	Metro	Primary design phase
Current total			32.5	23		

=== Line 1 ===
Constructions for Line 1 were started in 2001, and the first phase for this line was officially commenced by Vice-president Eshaq Jahangiri on 11 October 2014. The first phase runs for 11 kilometres between Ehsan Sq. in the north-western part of the city and Namazi Sq. in downtown with eight stations in between. Line 1 runs over the ground surface between Mirza-yé Shirazi and Shahed stations. The second phase was recently commenced and service is now operational all the way to Shahid Dastgheyb station on Allah Square, located just by the city airport in the south-eastern part of the city. This has extended Line 1 to 24.5 kilometres with 19 underground and 1 surface stations in between.

At the 13.5-kilometre (8.4 mi) southern end of Line 1, two separate tunnels, each with a diameter of 6 metres (20 ft), were constructed, with the rest was built as a double track cut-and-cover tunnel. Stations in shallow underground sections have side platforms, while deep-level stations have island platforms.

Shiraz Line 1 stations
Name	connections	Condition	Opened
Shahid Dastgheyb		Active	2017
Shahid Doran		Active	2017
Forsat-e Shirazi		Active	2018
Janbazan		Active	2018
Ghadir		Active	2018
Razi		Active	2017
Fazilat		Active	2017
Kaveh		Active	2018
Valiasr		Active	2017
Vakilorroaya		Active	2020
Zandiyeh		Active	2015
Imam Hossein		Active	2019
Namazi		Active	2014
Shahid Avini		Active	2017
Shahid Motahari		Active	2017
Qasrodasht		Active	2014
Shahed		Active	2015
Mirza-ye Shirazi		Active	2015
Shari'ati		Active	2014
Ehsan		Active	2014

=== Line 2 ===
The 15-kilometre (9.3 mi) Line 2 officially opened on 8 February 2023, with 3 stations (5.6-kilometre (3.5 mi)) as the first phase. It intersects with Line 1 at Imam Hossein Sq. on 31 August of the same year, another station was opened, making the total active stations of this line, 4.

Line 2 runs to Mian Rood and Aadel Abad via Enghelab Street and Basij Square. There are two separate tunnels, each with 7 metre in diameter, at the depth of 15 metres. Among the 13 planned stations, 2 of them will be on the surface.

Shiraz Line 2 stations
Name	connections	Condition	Opened
Shokoufeh		Under construction	
Ghahramanan		Active	2023
Adelabad		Active	2023
Dowlat		Active	2024
Rahmat		Active	2024
Basij		Active	2023
Esteghlal		Active	2026
15-e Khordad		Under construction	
Imam Hossein		Active	2023
Azadi		Under construction	
Atlasi		Under construction	
Hafezieh		Under construction	
Sa'adieh		Under construction	

=== Line 3 (to Sadra) ===
The eight-station, 10-kilometre (6.2 mi) Line 3 is under construction. First station will start from Mirza-ye Shirazi Metro Station in Line 1 and connects to Sadra, Fars, new city in northwest of Shiraz.

Shiraz Line 3 stations
Name	connections	Condition	Opened
Mirza-ye Shirazi		Under construction	
Milad		Under construction	
Sanaye'e		Under construction	
Dr. Hesabi		Under construction	
Beheshti		Under construction	
Afarinesh		Under construction	
Golestan		Under construction	
Rah Ahan		Under construction	

=== Line 4 ===
The 18-kilometre (11 mi) Line 4 connects Ehsan to Razi by passing Farhanshahr, Pasdaran, and Esteghlal boulevards. The first phase, connecting Razi to Esteghlal will have 8 stations.

Shiraz Line 3- Phase 1 stations
Name	connections	Condition	Opened
Razi		Under construction	
Isar		Under construction	
Shahrdari		Under construction	
Zeynabieh		Under construction	
Astaneh		Under construction	
Shahzadeh Ghasem		Under construction	
Darvazeh Kazerun		Under construction	
Esteghlal		Under construction	

=== Future Lines ===
Lines 5 and 6 are in the design stage.

=== Rolling stock ===
Line 1 is being operated using a fleet of 27 five-car 1.5 kV DC overhead electric train-sets which were supplied by the Chinese CNR Corporation and a local partner (IRICO), under a contract awarded in November 2010.

=== Fares and Tickets ===
Most of the public transportation fares in urban area in Iran can be paid by smart card or cash/token. The smart card can be used for buses and taxi and sometimes other services and even purchases. The CityWay smart card service is provided by Shar Bank and can be purchased at subway station and automatically recharged. As of summer 2023 Shiraz subway single fare by smart card is 12,000 Rials (1,200 Iranian Toman, ~ US$0.02 as US$ rate is about 49,500 Tomans) or 20,000 Rials (~ US$0.04) for cash purchase. Shiraz City Council in Sept 2023 approved a raise of single fare by smart card to 18,000 Rials and 30,000 Rials for cash purchase.

Time table of Shiraz Metro fares/prices:

2022–2023: Single fares by smart card 12,000 Rials (1,200 Tomans) and by cash/token 20,000 Rials

2021–2022: Single fares by smart card 9,000 Rials (900 Tomans) and by cash/token 15,000 Rials

2018–2019: Single fares by smart card 7,000 Rials (700 Tomans) and by cash/token 10,000 Rials

2017–2018: Single fares by smart card 5,000 Rials (500 Tomans) and by cash/token 6,000 Rials

2014–2015: Single fares 5,000 Rials (500 Tomans- ~ US$0.14 as US$ rate was about 3,500 Tomans) and double fares 8,000 Rials on the first year of work of Shiraz metro.

== Gallery ==
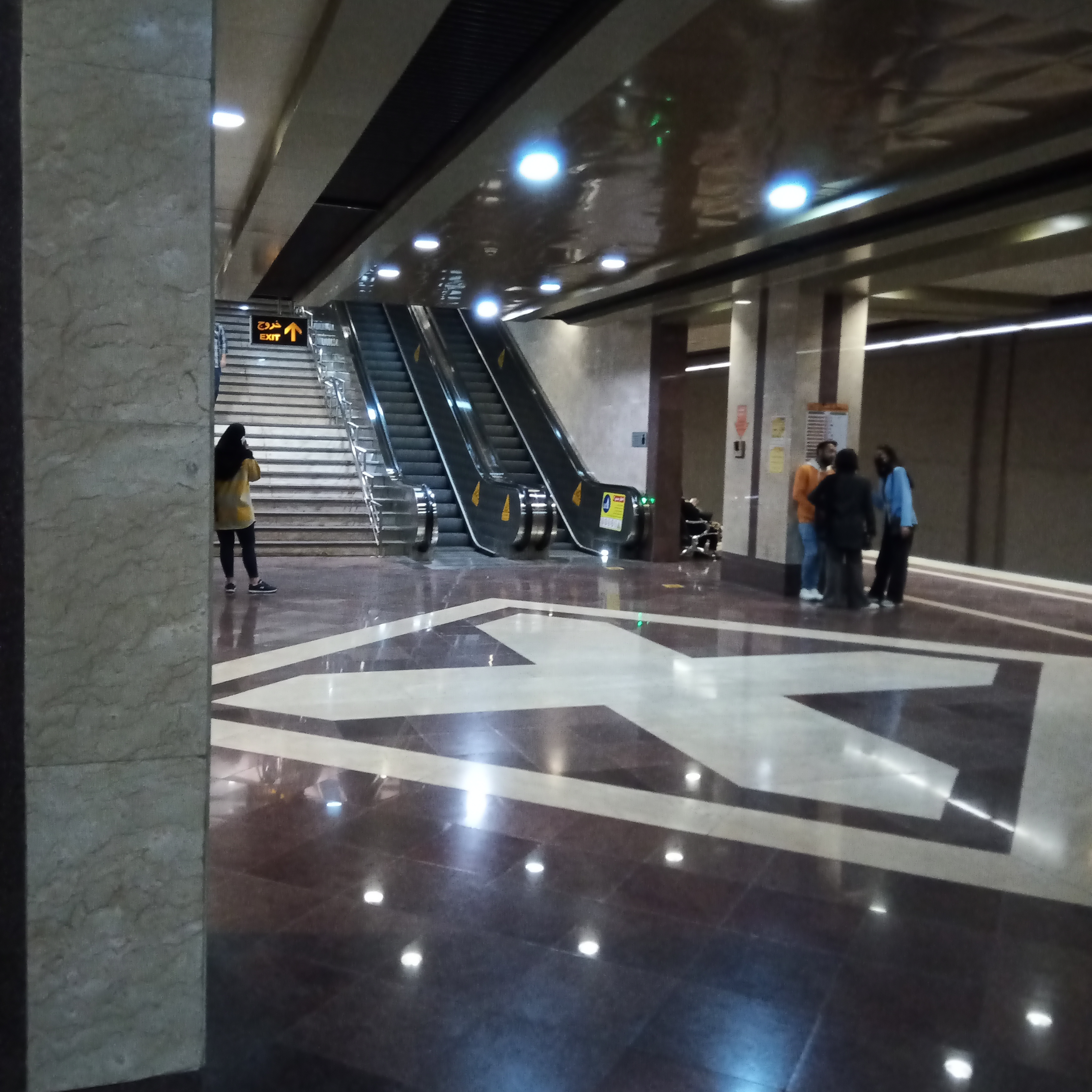
Shiraz Metro-Namazi Station-Esclators and Stairs

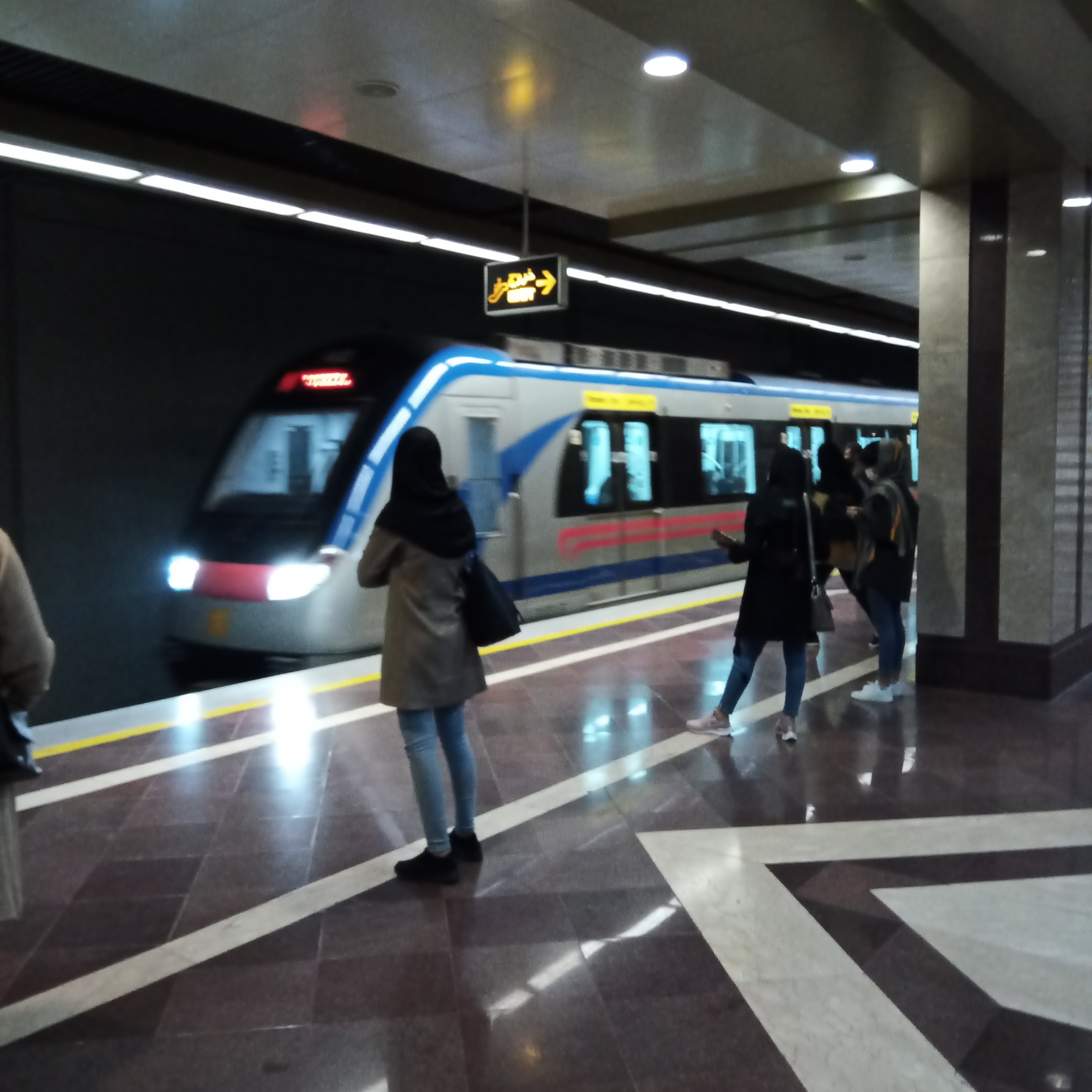
Shiraz Metro-Namazi Station-Passengers

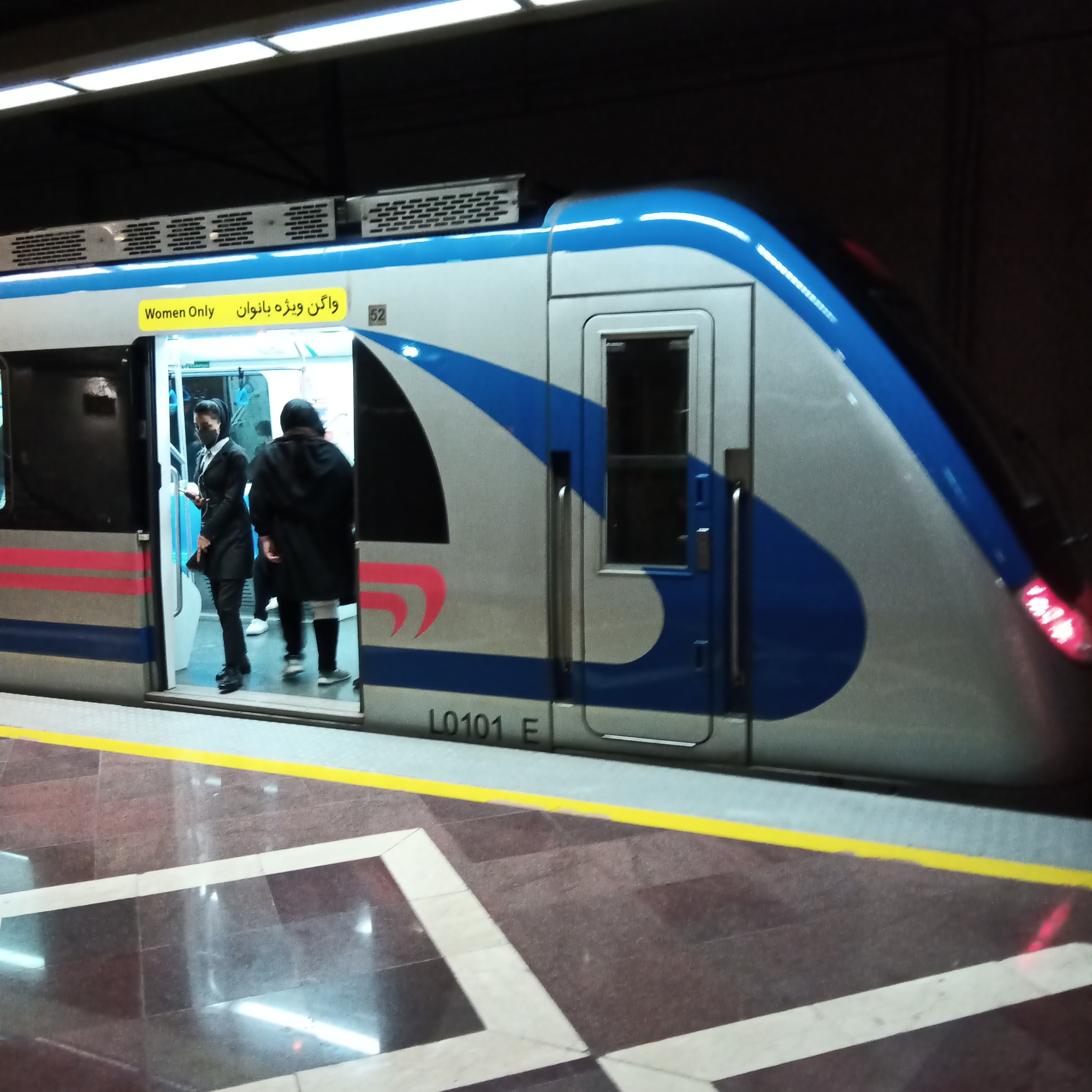
Shiraz Metro Namazi Station Passengers

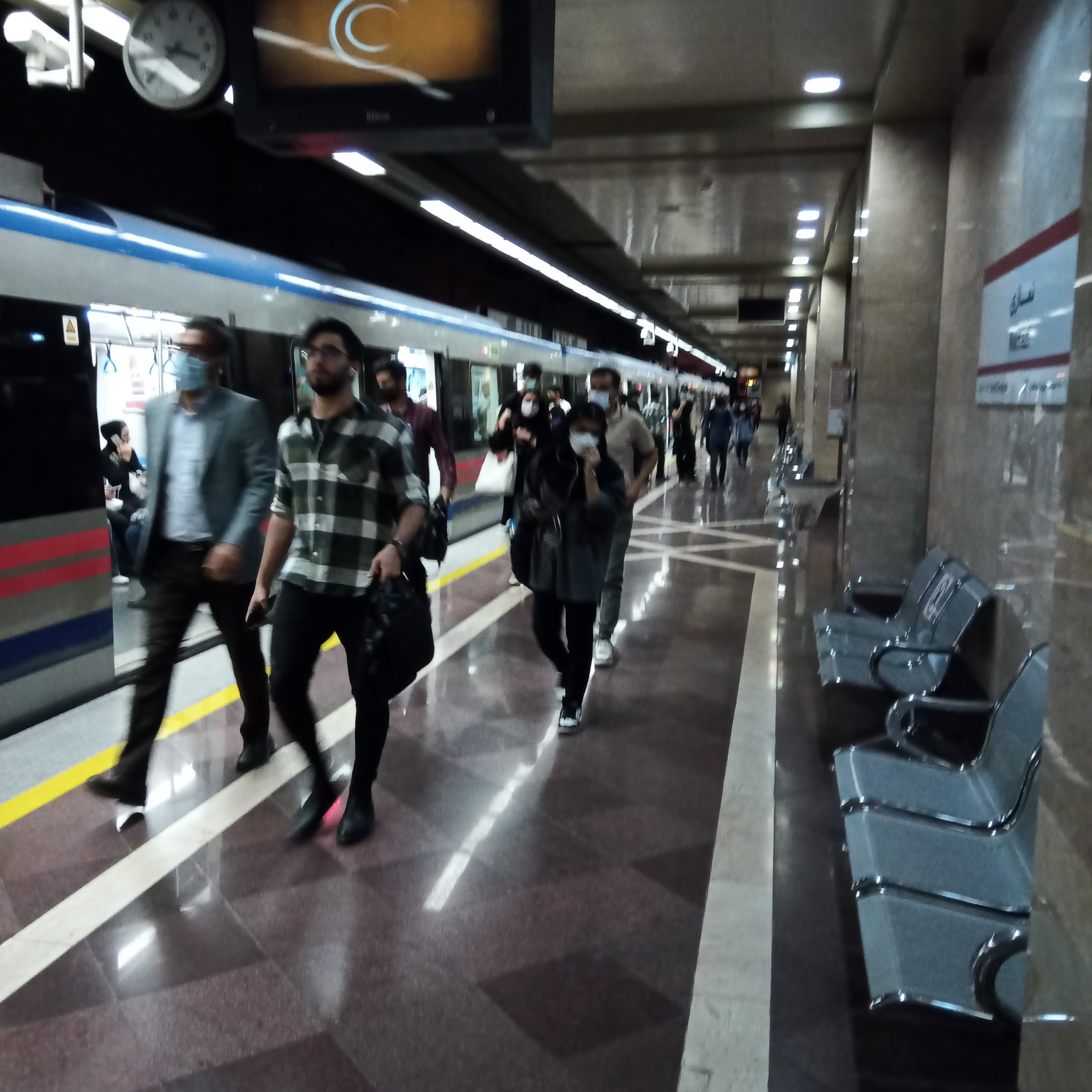
Shiraz Metro-Namazi Station-Passengers during COVID-19- April 2022

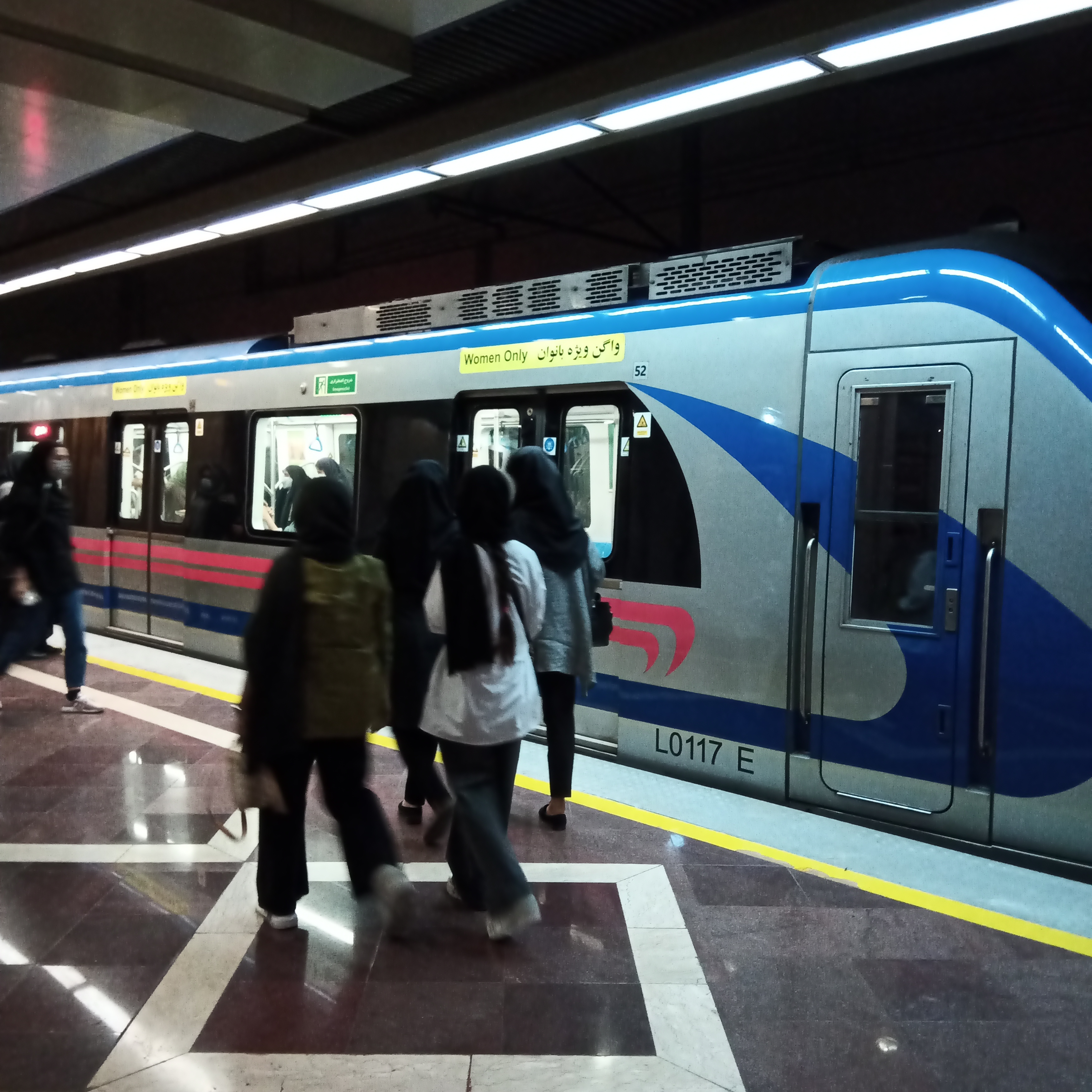
Shiraz Metro-Namazi Station-Passengers

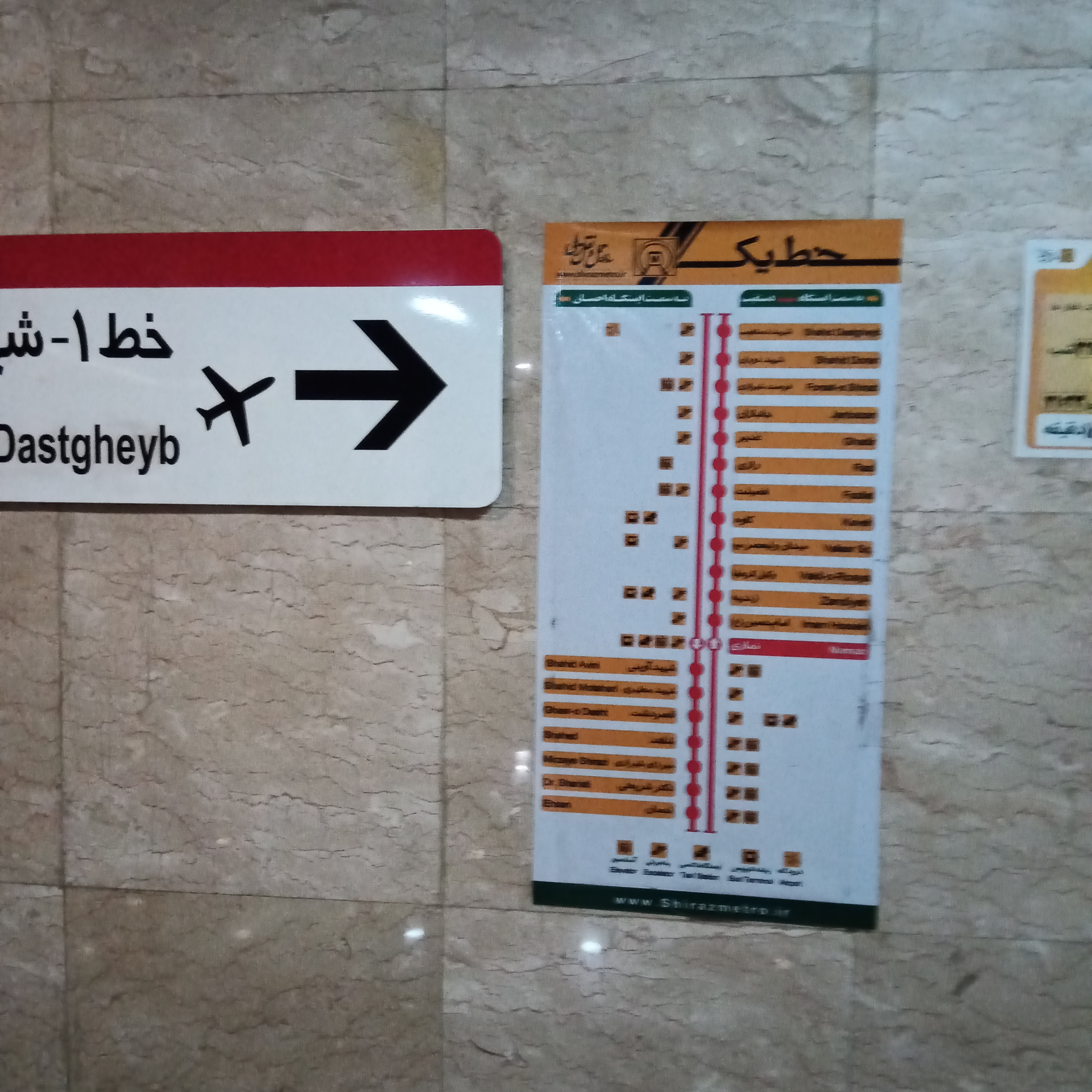
Shiraz Metro-Namazi Station-Route Map

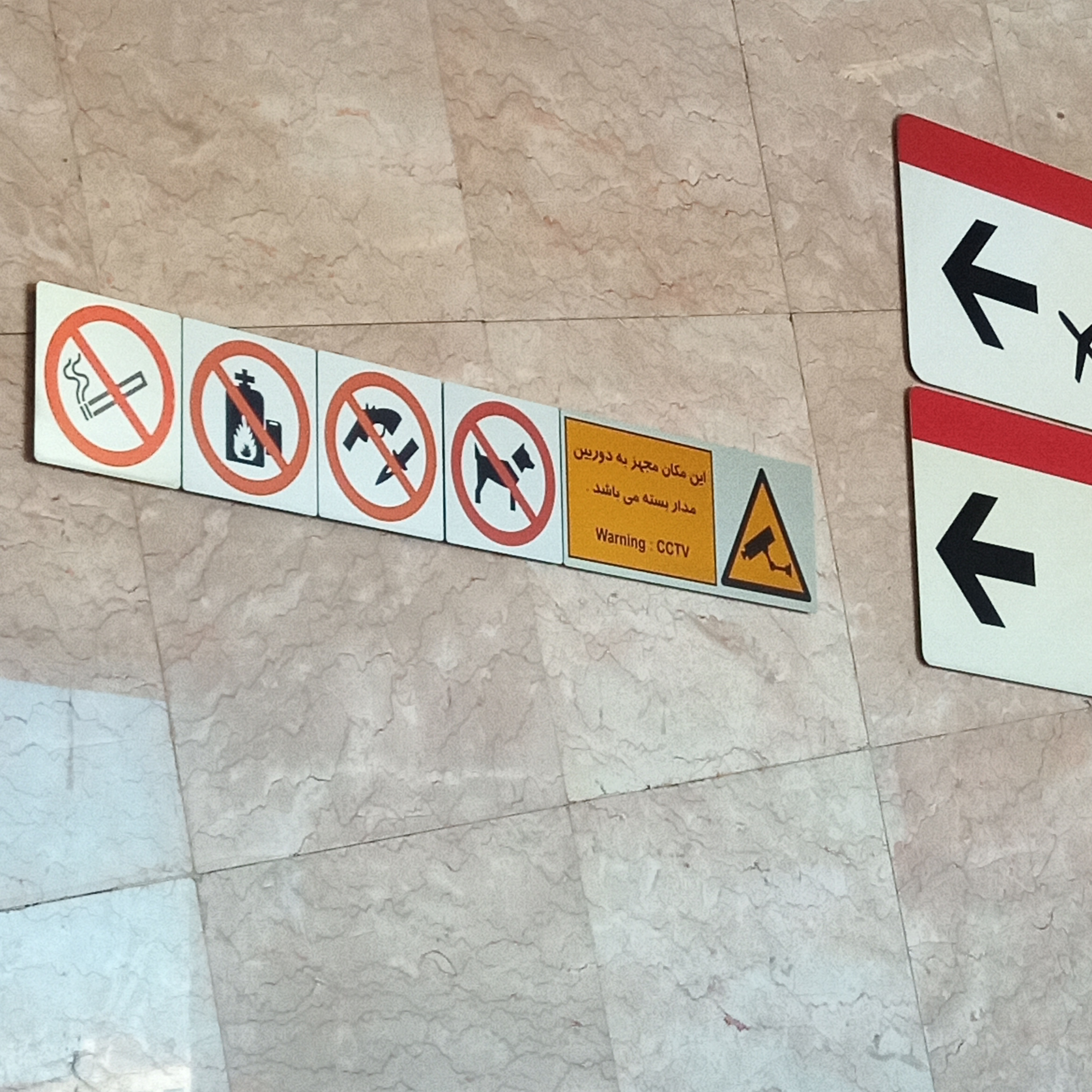
Shiraz Metro-Namazi Station-Sings

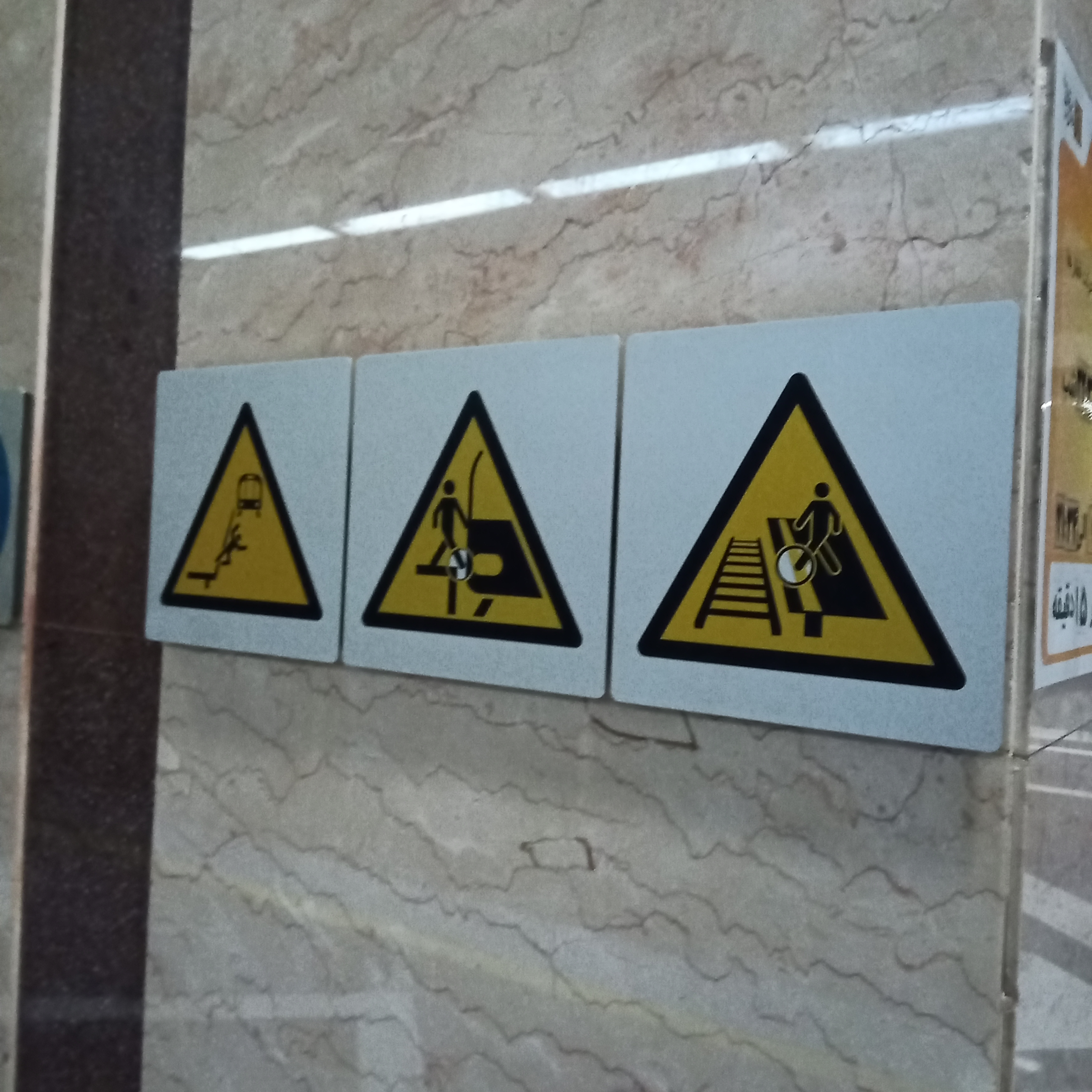
Shiraz Metro-Namazi Station-Sings

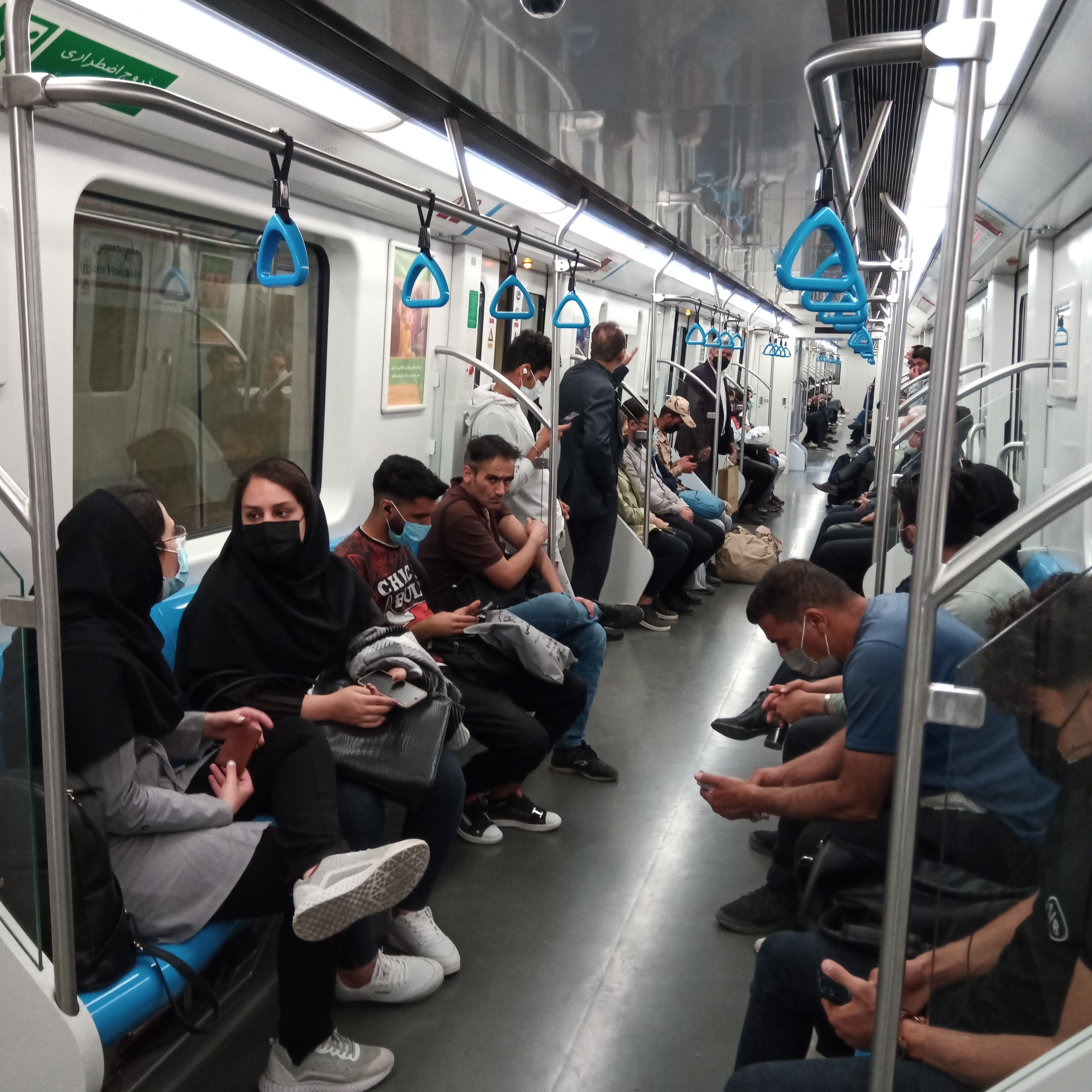
Shiraz Metro-Passengers during COVID-19, March 2022

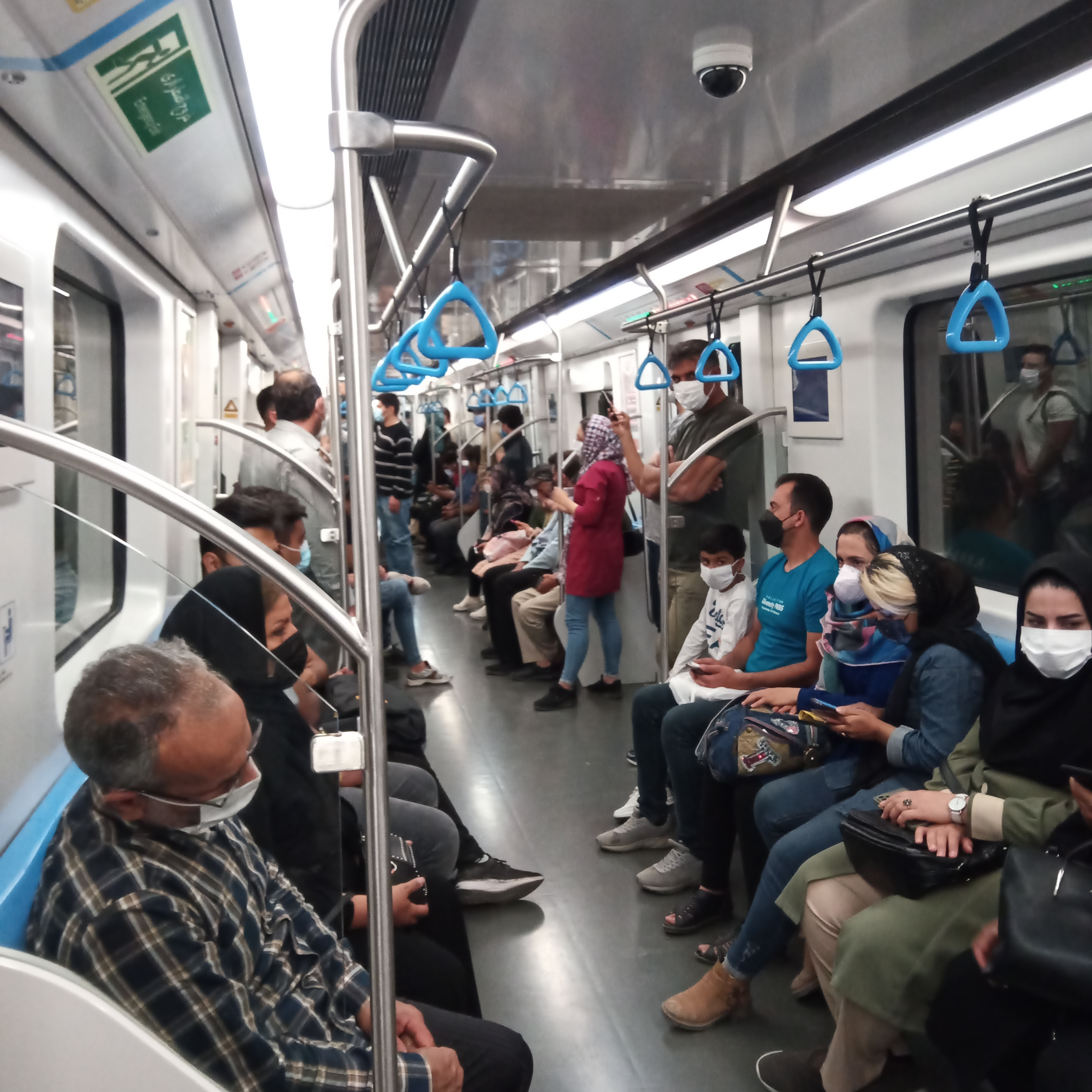
Shiraz Metro-Passengers during COVID-19, April 2022

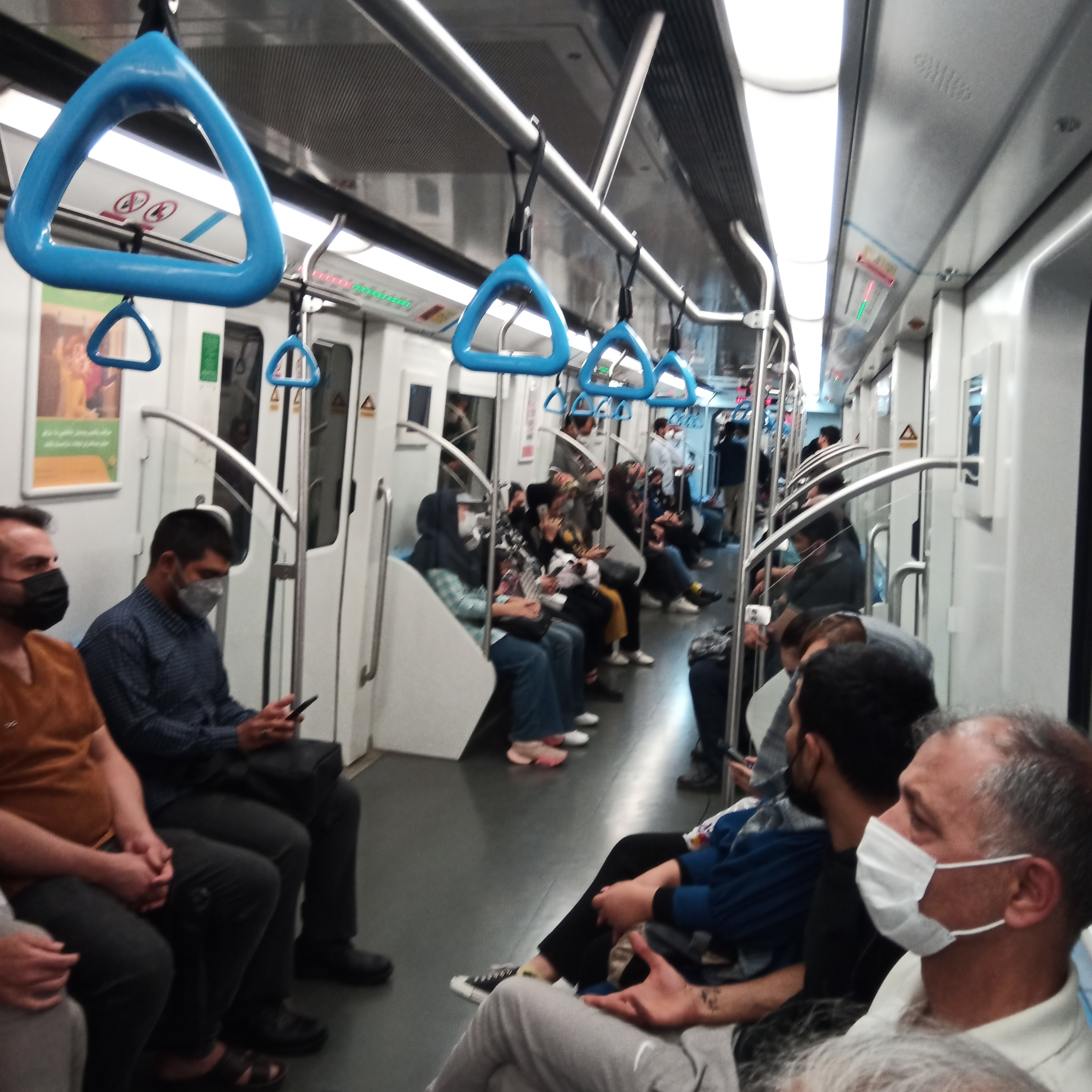
Shiraz Metro-Passengers during COVID-19, April 2022

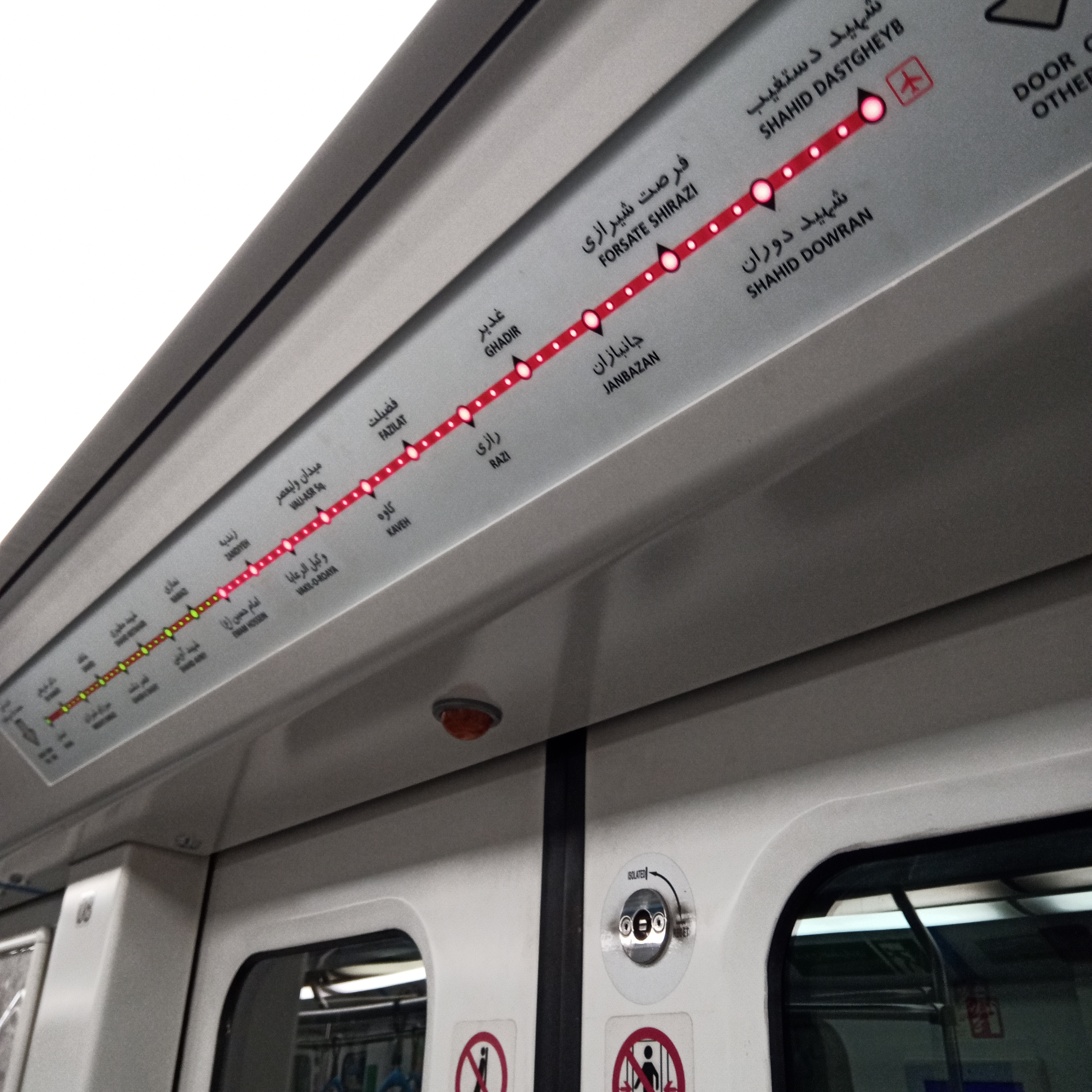
Shiraz Metro-Inside Route Map

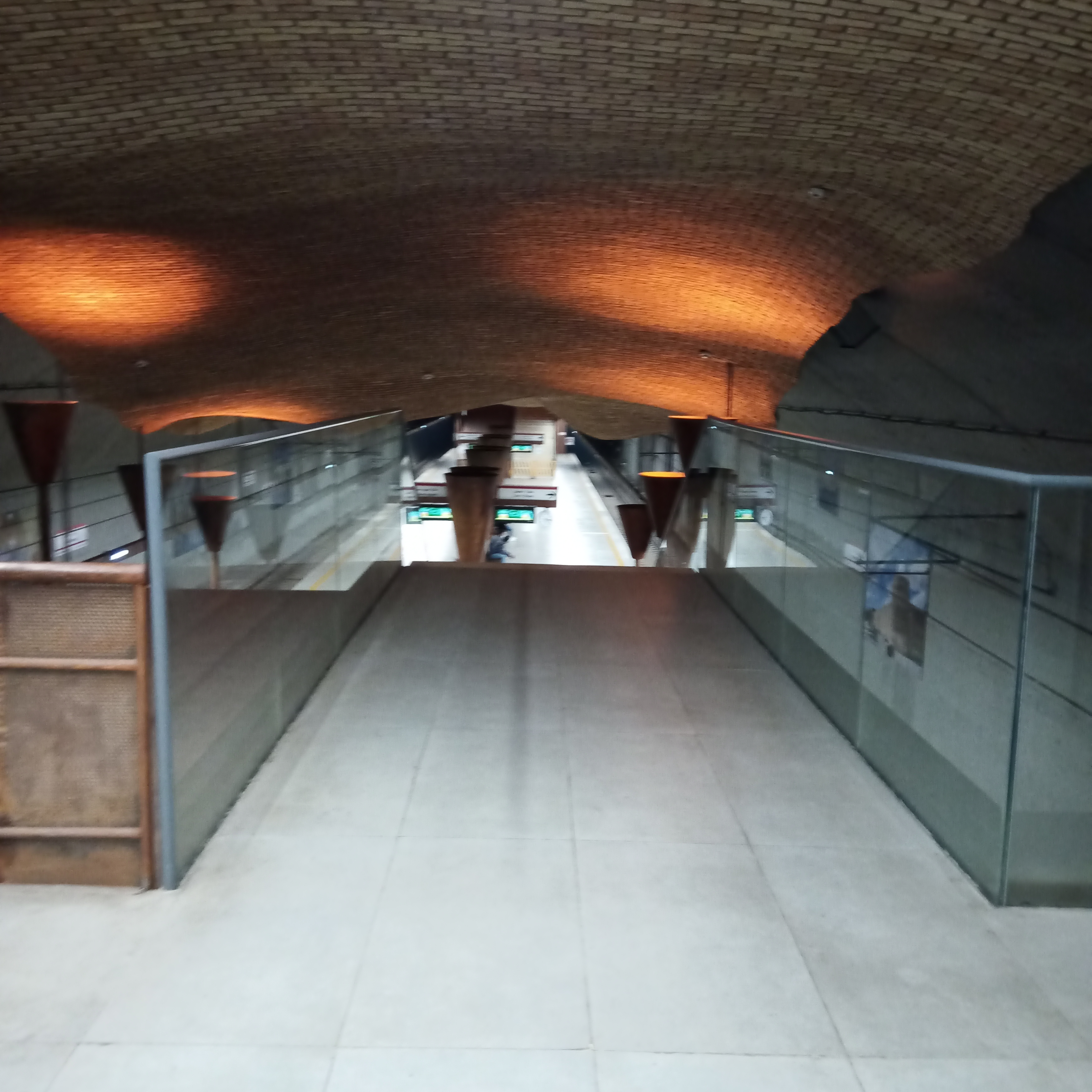
Shiraz Metro-Vakilo Roaya Station

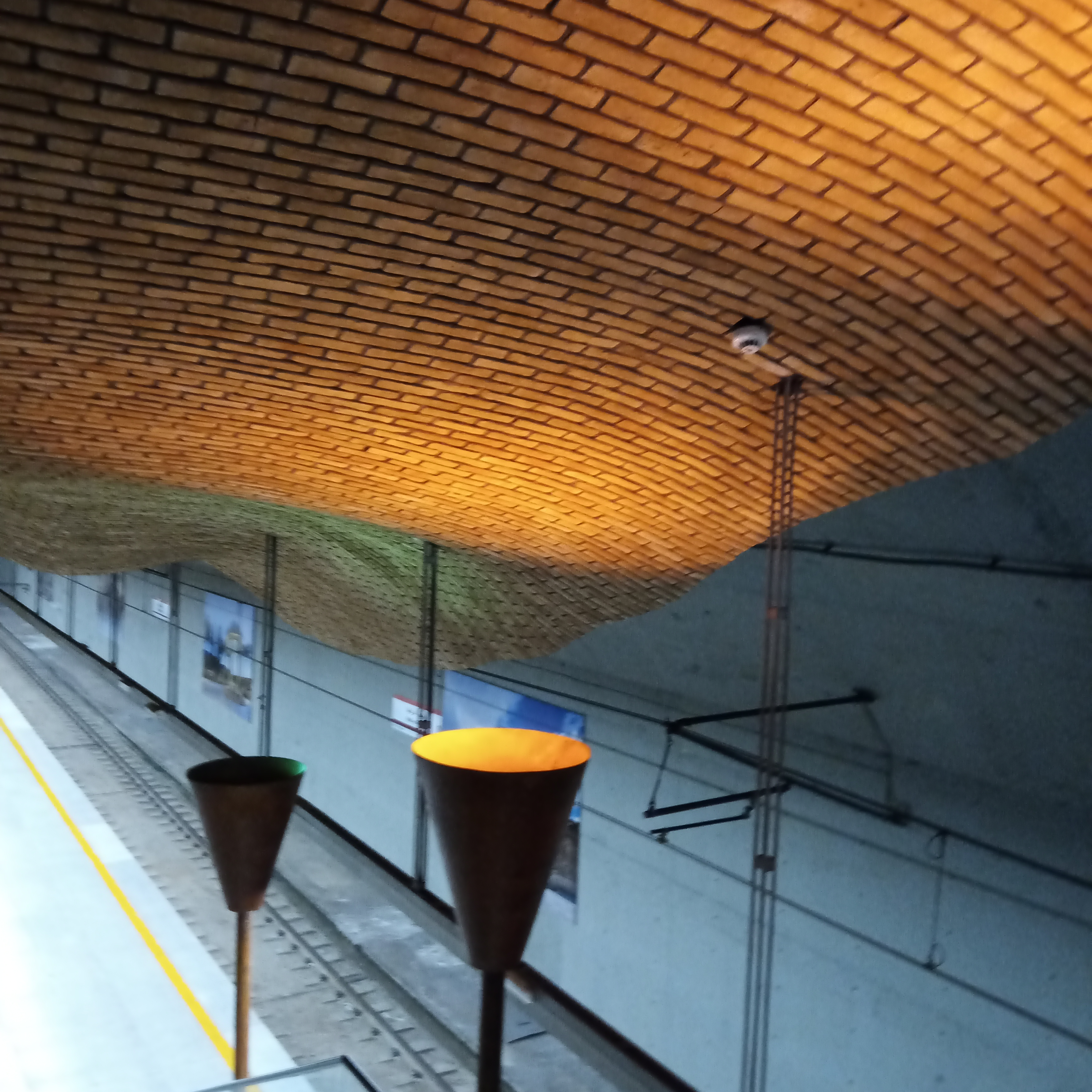
Shiraz Metro-Vakilo Roaya Station

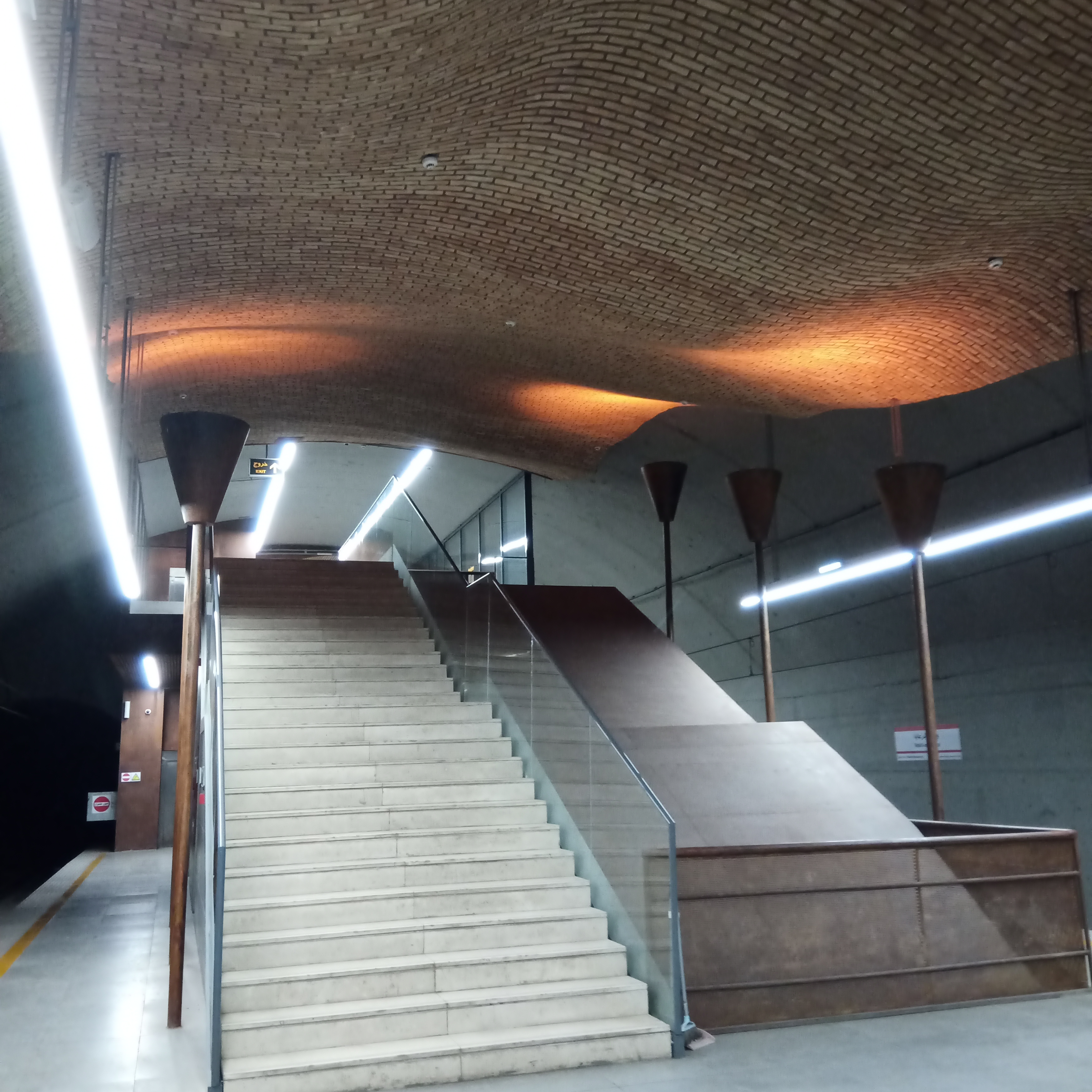
Shiraz Metro-Vakilo Roaya Station

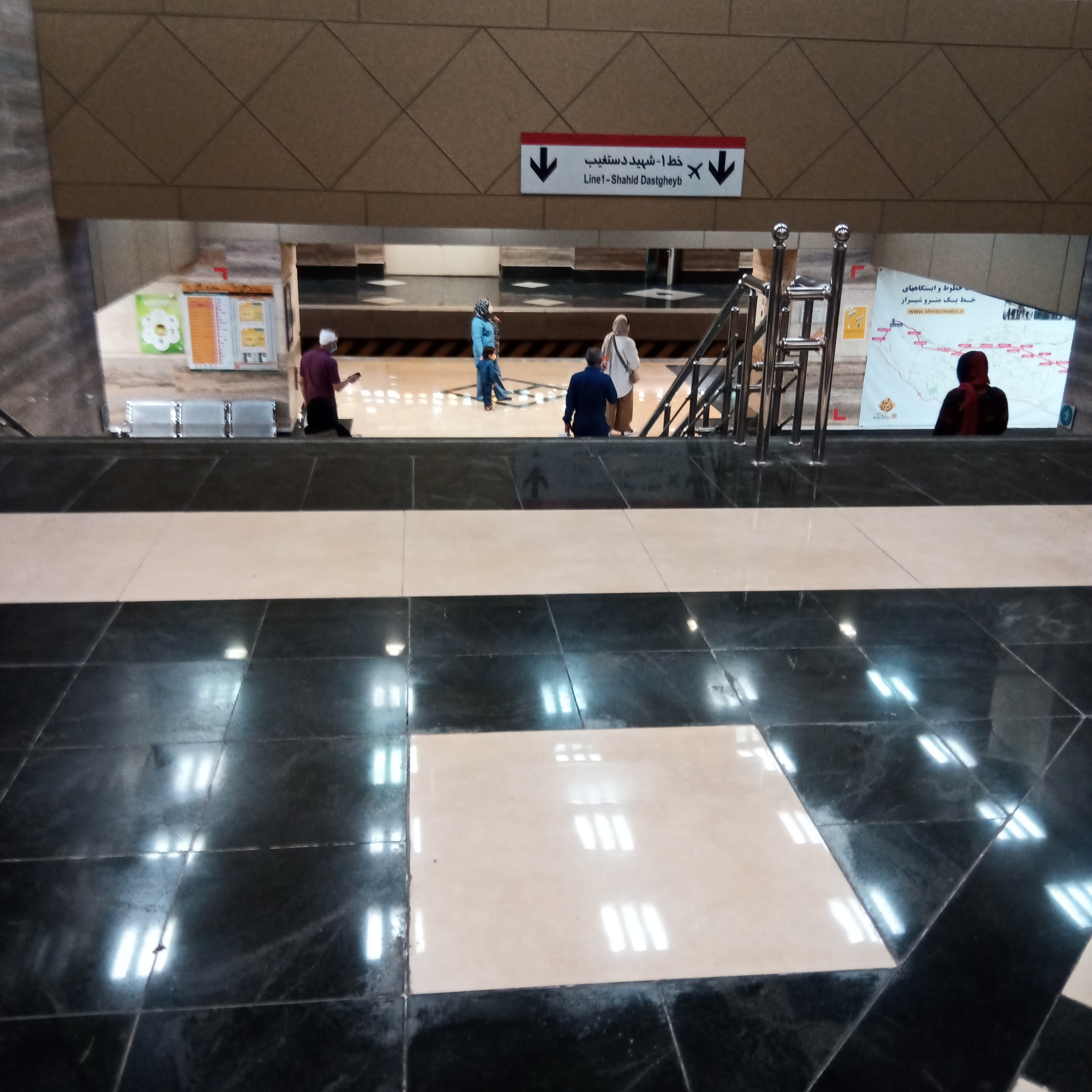
Shiraz Metro-Mirzaye Shirazi Station

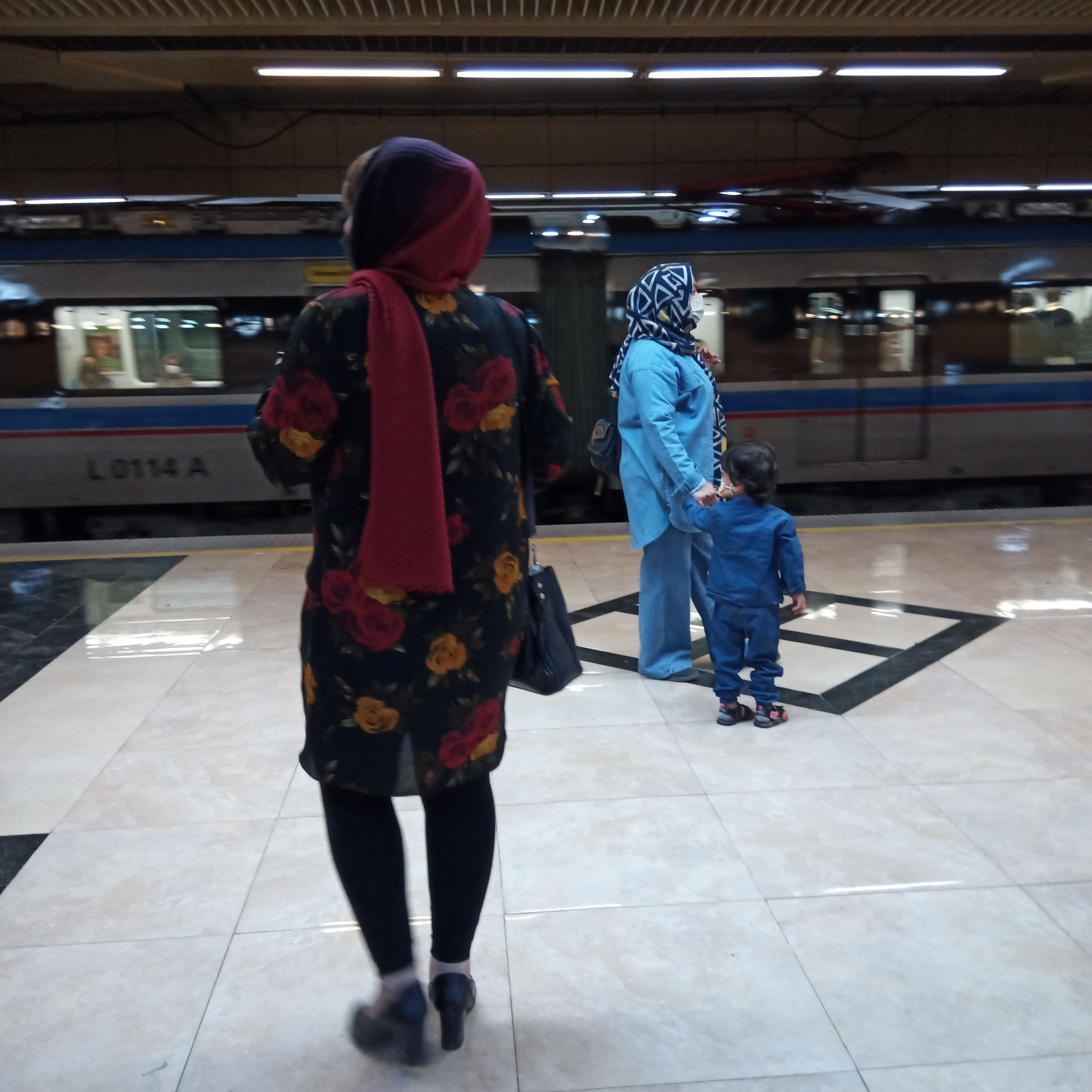
Shiraz Metro-Mirzaye Shirazi Station-Passengers during COVID-19, April 2022

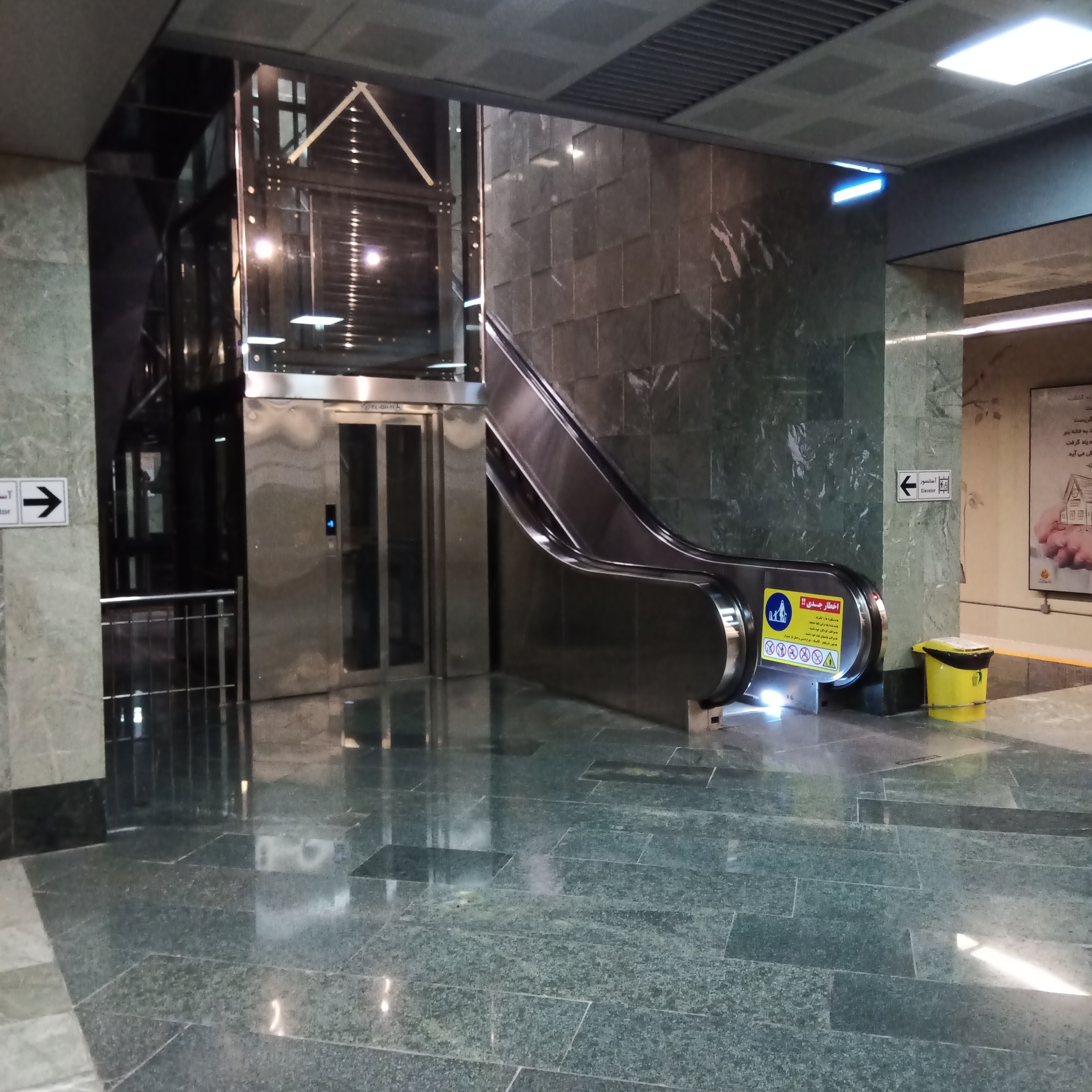
Shiraz Metro-Ghadeer Station

== See also ==
- Rapid transit in Iran
