= Mehdi Qoli Khan Qajar =

Khan of Erivan from 1805 to 1806

Khan of Erivan
- Reign: 1805–1806
- Predecessor: Mohammad Khan Qajar
- Successor: Ahmad Khan Moqaddam
- Monarch: Fath-Ali Shah Qajar
- Father: Mohammad Zaman Khan

Mehdi Qoli Khan Qajar (Persian: مهدی قلی خان قاجار) was an Iranian military commander, who served as the khan (governor) of the Erivan Khanate from 1805 to 1806.

== Biography ==
He belonged to the Qavanlu branch of the Qajar tribe. He was the son of Mohammad Zaman Khan and nephew of Mostafa Khan Qavanlu-Qajar, a commander under Agha Mohammad Khan Qajar, the first Qajar shah (king) of Iran. Mehdi Qoli Khan was one of the most skilled commanders of the crown prince Abbas Mirza, and participated in the Russo-Persian War of 1804–1813.

In 1805, Mehdi Qoli Khan was appointed as the khan (governor) of the Erivan Khanate by Fath-Ali Shah Qajar (r. 1797–1834). Mehdi Qoli Khan started to treat the minorities (Armenians and Kurds) badly after blaming the Russian successes on them. The Russian general Ivan Gudovich was concerned about leaving Tiflis unprotected and prohibited Major-General A. Nesvetov from carrying out his plan to invade Erivan, but the general discontent and the decline of Iranian-Ottoman relations could have easily given the Russians a reason to attack. As a result of Gudovich's orders, the Russians did not take advantage of the opportunity.

Due to Mehdi Qoli Khan's ineffectiveness, the shah had him replaced with Ahmad Khan Moqaddam, the beglarbeg (governor-general) of Tabriz and Khoy.

== Sources ==
- Behrooz, Maziar (2023). Iran at War: Interactions with the Modern World and the Struggle with Imperial Russia. I.B. Tauris. ISBN 978-0755637379.
- Bournoutian, George (1976). The Khanate of Erevan Under Qajar Rule: 1795–1828. University of California. ISBN 978-0939214181.
- Bournoutian, George (2021). From the Kur to the Aras: A Military History of Russia's Move into the South Caucasus and the First Russo-Iranian War, 1801–1813. Brill. ISBN 978-9004445154.
- Negahban, Farzin (2008). "Āghā Muḥammad Khān Qājār". In Madelung, Wilferd; Daftary, Farhad (eds.). Encyclopaedia Islamica Online. Brill Online. ISSN 1875-9831.

Preceded by Mohammad Khan Qajar of Erivan	Khan of the Erivan Khanate; 1805–1806	Succeeded by Ahmad Khan Moqaddam
