= Hasan Ali Khan Qajar =

Khan of Erivan from 1755 to 1759

Khan of Erivan
- Reign: 1755 – 1759
- Predecessor: Khalil Khan Uzbek
- Successor: Hoseyn Ali Khan
- Born: Yerevan, Erivan Khanate
- Died: 1759; Yerevan, Erivan Khanate
- Father: Khalil Khan
- Religion: Shia Islam

Hasan Ali Khan Qajar (Persian: حسن علی خان قاجار) was the khan (governor) of the Erivan Khanate from 1755 to 1769.

== Biography ==
He was born in Yerevan in a family of Khalil khan and belonged to the Qovanlu branch of the Qajar tribe.

Hasan Ali Khan became the head of the Erivan Khanate in 1755 after the uprising of the people, during which the past Khalil Khan Uzbek was overthrown. Sources confirm that already in 1755 the power in the Erivan Khanate belonged to Hasan Ali-Khan Qajar, a representative of the local Qajar dynasty. According to Ivan Chopin, with the beginning of the reign of Hasan Ali Khan Qajar, power in the Erivan Khanate began to be hereditary.

During the reign of Hasan Ali Khan Qajar, the campaigns of the king of Kartli-Kakheti against the Erivan Khanate became more frequent. As a result of these destructive campaigns, the Erivan Khanate since 1759 was forced to pay tribute annually to the treasury of Heraclius II.

Having foreseen the intentions of Heraclius II, the khan of Erivan invited Ahmad Khan Bayat of Maku to protect the city, who expressed his readiness to support the people of Erivan at the request of Shahbaz Khan of Khoy.

Hasan Ali Khan Qajar died of illness in 1759 in Yerevan. He was succeeded by his brother Hoseyn Ali as Khan of Erivan.

== See also ==
- Hoseyn Ali Khan
- Erivan Khanate
- Erivan Governorate

== Sources ==
- Chopin, Ivan (1852). Исторический памятник состояния армянской области в эпоху ее присоединения к Российской империи. St. Petersburg. p. 161.
- Chingizoglu, Anvar (2008). Qacarlar və Qacar kəndi — Qajar village and Qajars. Baku: Şuşa. p. 344.
- Qarayev, Elçin (2010). Erivan Khanate (1747–1828). Baku: Avropa. pp. 39–40.
- Yerevantsi, Simeon. Ջամբռ: Գիրք, որ կոչի յիշակարան արձանացռւցիչ, հայելի եւ պարռւնակող բնավից որպիսռւթեանց Սրբոյ Աթոռոյս, եւ իւրոյ շրջակայից վանօրէիցն. Vagharshapat: ՌՀԻԳ. p. 136.
