= Hossein Khan Sardar =

Iranian commander (c. 1742–1831)

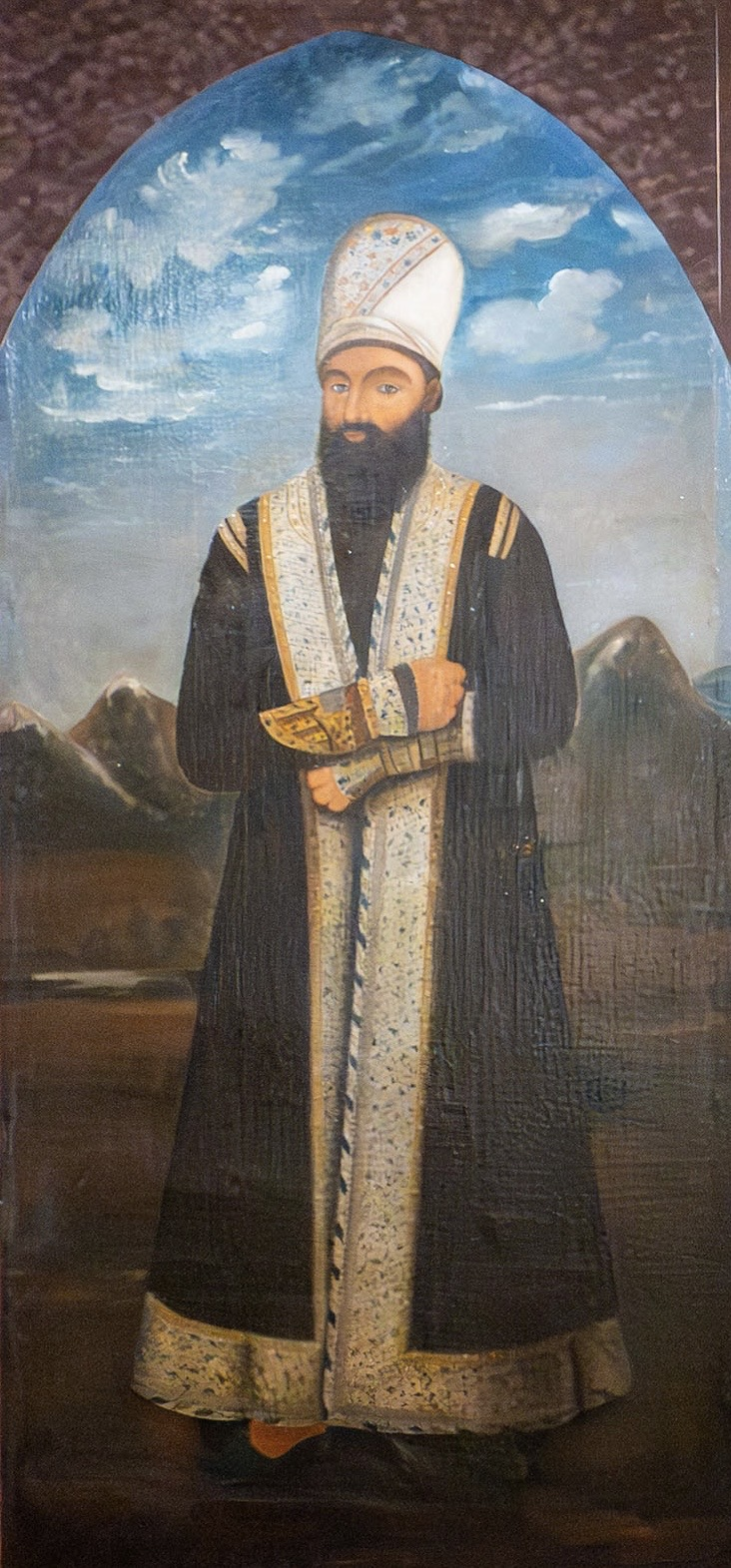
- Portrait of Hossein Khan by Mirza Kadym Irevani

Governor of Khorasan
- In office 1802–1807
- Monarch: Fath-Ali Shah Qajar

Governor of Erivan
- In office 1807–1828
- Monarch: Fath-Ali Shah Qajar
- Preceded by: Ahmad Khan Moqaddam
- Succeeded by: Office abolished

Personal details
- Born: c. 1742 Afsharid Iran
- Died: 1831 (aged 90) Qajar Iran
- Children: Mohammadqoli
- Parent: Mohammad Khan Qajar (father)
- Relatives: Hasan Khan Sari Aslan (brother)

Military service
- Allegiance: Qajar Iran
- Battles/wars: Russo-Persian Wars; Russo-Persian War (1804–1813); Siege of Erivan (1808); Battle of Akhalkalaki; Russo-Persian War (1826–1828); Battle of Oshakan; Capture of Erivan

Hossein Qoli Khan Qajar Sardar Iravani (Persian: حسین قلی خان قاجار سردار ایروانی) was a statesman and commander in Qajar Iran, who was the last khan (governor) of the Erivan Khanate from 1807 to 1828.

A member of the Qajar tribe and a close relative of the Qajar dynasty, Hossein Qoli was the son of Mohammad Khan Qajar of Erivan, who governed the Erivan Khanate from 1784 to 1805. Hossein Qoli is first mentioned in 1795, as an official and member of the household of his close friend, the crown prince Baba Khan (later known by his regnal name of Fath-Ali Shah Qajar) in the city of Shiraz. Following the death of Agha Mohammad Khan Qajar in 1797, Hossein Qoli played a key role in helping Baba Khan secure the throne, thus being granted numerous rewards, such as tuyuls (land grants) and marriage into the royal family.

Hossein Qoli served as a guardian of the northern passageways to Tehran from Qazvin until 1802, when he was appointed governor of the eastern province of Khorasan, which he brought stability to over the course of five years. In 1807, he was sent to the Caucasus to participate in the war with Russia. He was soon afterwards appointed the governor of the Erivan Khanate, where he was given free rein due to Fath-Ali Shah's confidence in him. The war ended with the Treaty of Golestan in 1813, in which the Iranians agreed to cede all of their Caucasian territory with the exception of Erivan and Nakhichevan.

In 1826, another war between Iran and Russia erupted, which concluded in 1828 with another Iranian defeat. By agreeing to the Treaty of Turkmenchay, Iran also lost Erivan and Nakhichevan. Hossein Qoli, in contrast to the other khans in the Caucasus, avoided making a deal with the Russians and was able to hinder their plans for twenty years. Article XII of the Treaty of Turkmenchay, which specifically denied him and his brother the ability to sell or trade their property in Erivan—a right guaranteed to everyone else—was a clear indication of Russia's irritation. Hossein Qoli died in 1831 at the age of 90. Iranian accounts state that he was respected by Fath-Ali Shah and died in good health. But according to Armenian and Western accounts, he died in an impoverished and depressed state in a stable.

== Background ==
Hossein Qoli belonged to the Qovanlu branch of the Turkic Qajar tribe and was a close relative of the royal Qajar dynasty of Iran. His father was Mohammad Khan Qajar of Erivan, who governed the Erivan Khanate from 1784 to 1805. Hossein Qoli was born c. 1742, but his place of birth is unknown. It may have been in the city of Qazvin due to his (infrequent) use of the title of "Qazvini". However, his title is most likely related to his later victory against Sadeq Khan Shaqaqi near Qazvin and his later post there. During this period, Iran was ruled by Nader Shah (r. 1736–1747) of the Afsharid dynasty.

== Career ==
=== Consolidating the rule of the crown prince ===
Except for being held as a hostage in the center of Iran, there is no documented history of his youth. The first mention of him is in 1795, as a member of the household of his close friend, the crown prince Baba Khan (later known by his regnal name of Fath-Ali Shah Qajar) in the city of Shiraz. There he was an official who served as the yuzbashi ("head of the household slaves"). The assassination of Agha Mohammad Khan in Shusha in 1797 gave rise to a number of pretenders to the throne, Sadeq Khan Shaqaqi being the most significant. With the support of the Turkmens in the north, he marched towards the Iranian capital of Tehran. However, Baba Khan, being escorted by Hossein Qoli, arrived in Tehran first.

After having assembled an army there, he appointed Hossein Qoli as its leader, and also gave him the title of khan. Hossein Qoli subsequently helped Baba Khan become shah by defeating Sadeq Khan Shaqaqi in the battle of Qazvin. During the same year, Hossein Qoli suppressed a Zand rebellion caused by Muhammad Khan in the city of Isfahan. Following that, he defeated Nader Shah's grandson Nader Mirza, who was attempting to restore the power of the Afshars in the Khorasan province. By 1800, all of Fath-Ali Shah's rivals had been defeated by Hossein Qoli, and thus the position of the dynasty was secure.

The traveller von Freygang, when describing Hossein Qoli, stated that "the khan by his boldness had raised the reigning Shah to the throne" and that "he enjoyed his master's full confidence". Fath-Ali Shah rewarded Hossein Qoli's commitment by not only giving him multiple tuyuls (land grants) but also by marrying his sister, giving his 29th daughter in marriage to Hossein Qoli's son Mohammadqoli, and asking one of Hossein Qoli's daughters to be the wife of his son and heir apparent, Abbas Mirza. Hossein Qoli served as a guardian of the northern passageways to Tehran from Qazvin until 1802. During that year, Khorasan saw factional conflict once more, with small Afshar clans notably opposing the shah. To put an end to the uprising, Fath-Ali Shah named Hossein Qoli as the province's governor. By putting the leaders in jail and blinding some of them under Fath Ali Shah's decree, Hossein Qoli was able to bring about stability over the course of five years.

Hossein Qoli's status and popularity grew along with his income. He used a portion of that income to build mosques, caravansaries, and baths in the regions under his rule. He soon became one of the richest men in Iran as a result of his fortune. Some of his family members received promotions as well, such as his brother Hasan Khan Sari Aslan, who received his former office of yuzbashi.

=== Assignment to the Caucasus ===
Within a short period of time, the Russian expansion replaced internal conflicts as the main threat to the throne. War had erupted between Iran and Russia in 1804, when the Russians seized the city of Ganja, which had been governed by the Ganja Khanate of Iran. Hossein Qoli was given a commission by Fath-Ali Shah in 1807 to defend the Caucasus from Russian encroachment and was given the title of sardar (commander-in-chief). Fath-Ali Shah had been powerless to stop the Russian progress in the Caucasus and had considered the khans in the Caucasus to be unreliable. In order to help the khan of Karabakh, Ibrahim Khalil Khan, who was under siege by a Russian army led by General Ivan Gudovich, Hossein Qoli rushed to the place. Being too late, Hossein Qoli instead marched towards Shirvan, where he attempted to thwart the attempt of its khan Mostafa Khan to cooperate with the Russians. He was unable to accomplish his goal there due to the presence of powerful Russian forces, and he was forced to flee towards Erivan.

=== Governorship of Erivan ===
==== First war with Russia ====
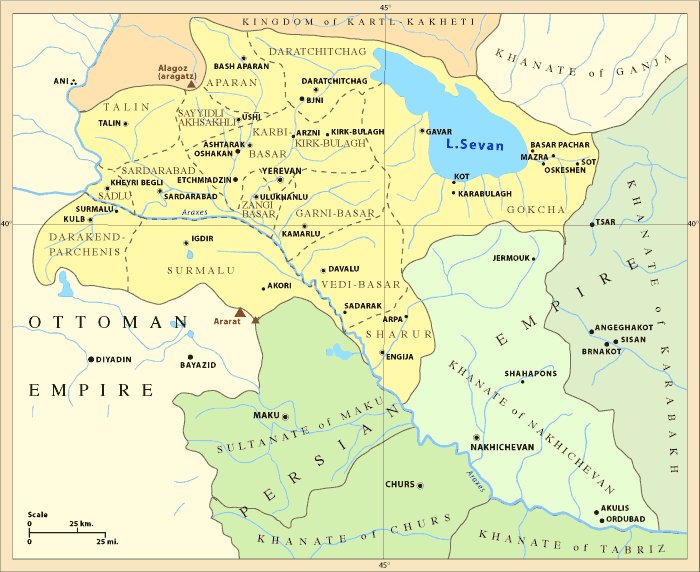
Map of the Erivan Khanate (yellow color) and its surroundings in c. 1800

It would be greatly difficult for the Russians to proceed into northern Iran if the Iranians were able to hold the region of Erivan, an important invasion route. Fath-Ali Shah appointed Hossein Qoli as its governor in the same year as a result of a number of Iranian defeats. He thought Hossein Qoli would be able to stop the Russian advance and build on his previous victories. Despite being well recognized for its formidable walls, Erivan's stronghold was additionally fortified and supplied to survive a protracted siege. In 1808, Hossein Qoli was joined by Hasan Khan as support against the approaching Russian invasion by Gudovich, which the brothers successfully repelled. Following their defeat, the Russians took some time before attempting another significant operation outside of Georgia. Gudovich, being cautious, refused to agree to yet another plan devised by his inexperienced officers. With the exception of Hosein Qoli's sporadic raids, all sides held their positions, a deadlock developed.

In 1809, Britain and Iran made an alliance, with the British guaranteeing that until all Russian forces had left Iranian territory or peace was made, they would supply Iran with a 200,000 toman annual stipend as well as a sizeable amount of military hardware. Britain wanted to maintain Iran politically and economically stable so that India could use it as a defensive stronghold. Later, Erivan's defenses were strengthened by British engineers and military experts, who also helped build the fortress of Sardarabad near Erivan, and Abbasabad in the Nakhichevan Khanate.

As the focal point of offensive and defensive operations against Russian forces in the Southern Caucasus, the Erivan Khanate grew in importance. A strong Iranian stronghold was established in the area as a result of this and the nearby presence of the main Iranian army at Tabriz. Additionally, Russian resources were diverted to other fronts by the Russo-Turkish War of 1806–1812, the French invasion of Russia, and the repeated clashes with Muslim tribes in Daghestan. As a result, the Erivan Khanate was not under immediate danger from Russia for almost twenty years.

In response to the assistance offered by Sherif Pasha of Akhaltsikhe, Hossein Qoli was in August 1810 sent there as the head of a 7,000-man army with orders to assault Georgia via Shuregol. He had recruited members of the Karapapakh tribe while en route, increasing the size of his army to 10,000. He traveled to Akhalkalaki at the end of August, where he encountered the Georgian prince Alexander, who told him that the Georgians were prepared to make an uprising against Russia and were only awaiting the presence of the Iranian army. However, Hossein Qoli did not believe him, and thus waited for Sherif Pasha to arrive with his 17,000 soldiers. Hosein Qoli Khan told Abbas Mirza that he would go back to Erivan if Sherif Pasha did not appear before the weather would get cold.

The Russian general Alexander Tormasov resolved to attack Hossein Qoli as soon as he realized Sherif Pasha had not mobilized his forces. The Russians unexpectedly attacked the Iranian camp on September 17 about three in the morning. The Iranians were taken by surprise and either fell into the fort's surrounding trench or ran into each other. Hossein Qoli and Prince Alexander left in their nightshirts amid the ensuing mayhem. After a three-hour fight, two khans and 700 men had been killed, whilst Esmail Khan and eleven begs were taken hostage. Many tents, horses, and other pieces of equipment were also taken by the Russians, while many horses were seized by the escaping Karapapakh tribesmen.

In 1812, the Russians made peace with the Ottoman Empire, and with the withdrawal of French forces, men that were urgently required on the Caucasian front could be transferred. By 1813, the Russian armies were once more on the offensive and had won several battles. The British were now fighting alongside Russia against France, and thus stopped helping Iran, instead advising them to make peace with Russia.

Fath-Ali Shah and Abbas Mirza were pressed to reach an agreement with Russia by the British diplomat Gore Ouseley, who in return promised to assist Iran diplomatically in regaining some of its lost territory beyond the Aras River in addition to continuing the subsidies and the arms supply. If the Iranians refused, he cautioned them that Britain would no longer help Iran in the future. Lacking other opinions, Iran agreed to make peace with Russia, signing the Treaty of Golestan in 1813, in which the Russians received the Iranian lands of Baku, Ganja, Shakki, Quba, Shirvan, Karabakh, and parts of Talish. Moreover, Iran also had to abandon its claims over Georgia.

The treaty's territorial arrangements were unclear, for example, in Talish, where it was left up to the mutually appointed administrators to "determine what mountains, rivers, lakes, villages, and fields shall mark the line of frontier." If one of the participants to the treaty felt that the other party had "infringed on" territorial possessions claimed in accordance with the status quo principle, even the limits laid forth in the treaty could be changed. This essentially ensured that territorial conflicts would persist after the treaty's authorization. The region between Lake Gokcha and Erivan remained one of the most disputable.

==== Second war with Russia ====
Map of the Erivan Khanate in 1820, showing Lake Gokcha to the east and Bash Aparan to the north

In early 1825, the northern bank of Gokcha, which the Iranians believed to be a part of their realm, was seized by the Russians under the orders of Aleksey Petrovich Yermolov, the governor of Georgia. The Russian army soon advanced further, capturing Balagh-lu as well. The Iranians knew that these locations might be used as a staging ground for an attack on Erivan, therefore the significance of this went far beyond the sites themselves. Although Yermolov conceded that this was Iranian territory, he defended his action by claiming that Iran was clinging to a large portion of Karabakh. The Russians also constructed a small fort on the frontier with Erivan, which Abbas Mirza protested against. In the middle of 1825, the fort was attacked by the troops of Hossein Qoli.

On 8 July, the Russians captured the town of Bash Aparan in the northern Erivan Khanate, deep within Iranian territory. The Iranian American historian Maziar Behrooz considers the start of the war of 1826–1828. In Fath-Ali Shah's court, two factions had developed during the course of building policy toward Russia. One faction advocated for peace with Russia, and the other for war. Both were heavily lobbying Fath-Ali Shah and Abbas Mirza. The first question at hand was what to do if Russia did not stop their occupation of Gokcha and Balagh-lu. The state of the Muslim minority under Russian authority and, lastly, whether and to what extent Russia had been weakened as a result of its internal crises, were secondary concerns. To advise Fath-Ali Shah and formulate a course of action in this matter, the Council of Soltaniyeh gathered. The peace party at Fath-Ali Shah's court was ultimately outmanoeuvred and the final decision was to launch full-scale warfare against the Russians.

Despite Abbas Mirza's soldiers appearing to be unprepared for a large fight, Iran's entry into the war in the summer of 1826 started out successfully. This was due to two factors. Yermolov was initially embroiled in a struggle in Chechnya despite advocating for war; as a result, his men were unprepared for the war and were incapable to meet the approaching challenge. Second, with the support of their previous khans, the Muslim populace rose against Russians, as they had grown tired of being oppressed. In Shirvan, Ganja, Talish, Shakki and Karabakh (aside from Shusha), the stationed Russian troops were either driven out by the rebels or Iranian forces, or withdrew themselves. It is uncertain if rebellions occurred or were suppressed in Quba, Baku, Derbent and Georgia. Between 28 and 30 July, the Russian army fought an intense battle against Hossein Qoli, who conquered Pambak and Shuregol in northern Erivan. Meanwhile, Hasan Khan made attacks further north, forcing the Russians to withdraw to Tiflis. Between 1 and 3 August, Bash Aparan was recovered by Hossein Qoli, who then started fighting the Russians at Gyumri.

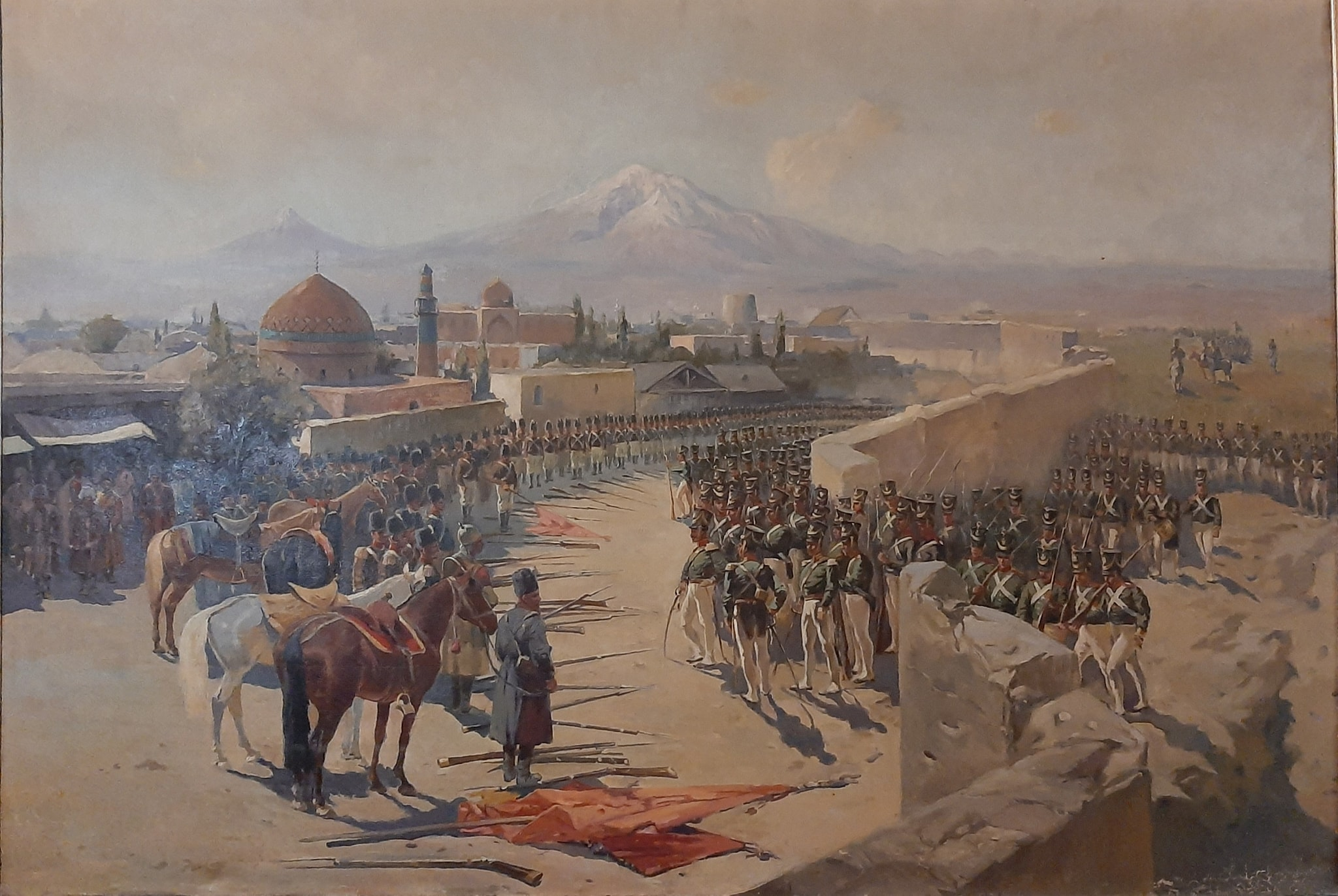
Russian entry into Erivan in 1827, painted by Franz Roubaud

By 1827, Abbas Mirza was losing the war and he had to shift from attacking to defending. A fourteen-day raid south of the River Aras was carried out by Madatov in January. Etchmiadzin surrendered in April, while Abbasabad and Ordubad, two fortresses in Nakhichevan, came under siege in July. On 7 July, Paskevich defeated Abbas Mirza, who had come to aid them, and both fortresses gave up. September saw the surrender of the impenetrable citadel of Erivan following a siege and intense bombardment, as well as Sardarabad. Using eight 24-pounder heavy guns and four 4-inch mortars, Paskevich destroyed the stronghold walls of Erivan. Sardar escaped Erivan before it was taken, but other commanders including Hasan Khan, Hamzeh Khan Anzali and Mahmud Khan Maqsudilu, were taken prisoner and moved to Tiflis.

On 2 February 1828, Abbas Mirza signed the Treaty of Turkmenchay, thus ceding Erivan and Nakhichevan as well as agreeing to significant war reparations and other concessions. Hossein Qoli, in contrast to the other khans in the Caucasus, avoided making a deal with the Russians and was able to hinder their plans for twenty years. Article XII of the Treaty of Turkmenchay, which specifically denied him and his brother the ability to sell or trade their property in Erivan—a right guaranteed to everyone else—was a clear indication of Russia's irritation.

Hossein Qoli died in 1831 at the age of 90. Iranian accounts state that he was respected by Fath-Ali Shah and died in good health. But according to Armenian and Western accounts, he died in an impoverished and depressed state in a stable.

== Administration ==
Other than Erivan, there is almost no information on Hossein Qoli's methods of rule. During his governorship of Erivan, he oversaw both the civil administration and military of the province.

To counter his ambitious heirs, notably Abbas Mirza, Fath-Ali Shah used Hossein Qoli as a balancing influence. Fath-Ali Shah was aware that Hossein Qoli was loyal to him and would not leave him for any proposal from the princes. Hossein Qoli, who was posted to the north of Abbas Mirza's domains, was thus given free rein by him. Hossein Qoli's authority was powerful enough to prevent the usual outbreak of violence between the settled and nomadic groups. Turkmen were typically chosen for the infantry, and Kurds for the cavalry. Nearly half of the province's inhabitants were nomads. These nomads received special rights (such as reduced taxes, privileges, pasture liberties, grants of land, and salaries) in exchange for staying clear of the villages and restraining their members from bothering the settled population. These nomads were given their own territories, which were managed by their clan leaders.

Throughout his twenty-year reign, Hossein Qoli made an effort to gain the support of the populace, particularly the Armenians. At the Etchmiadzin Cathedral outside of Erivan, Catholicos Daniel—the legitimate head of the Armenian Church—was restored after Catholicos David seized his position. Hossein Qoli maintained a friendly relationship with Melik Sahak Aqamal, the secular leader of the Armenians in the Erivan khanate, and played a key role in arranging the marriage of Isaac's daughter with Alexander.

== Legacy and assessment ==
Hossein Qoli was regarded by visitors as one of the richest and most powerful chiefs in Iran, having authority equal to Abbas Mirza's. According to the modern historian Muriel Aktin, "even the Russians respected him as a soldier."

One of the few notable Iranian nobles who was exempt from the requirement to depart Tehran with court prisoners was Hossein Qoli.

== Sources ==
- Atkin, Muriel (1980). Russia and Iran, 1780–1828. University of Minnesota Press. ISBN 978-0816609246.
- Aktin, Muriel (2018). "The Early Stages of Russo–Iranian Relations". In Matthee, Rudi; Andreeva, Elena (eds.). Russians in Iran: Diplomacy and Power in the Qajar Era and Beyond. I.B. Tauris. pp. 11–23. ISBN 978-1-78673-336-8.
- Behrooz, Maziar (2023). Iran at War: Interactions with the Modern World and the Struggle with Imperial Russia. I.B. Tauris. ISBN 978-0755637379.
- Bournoutian, George (1976). "Husayn Qulī Khān Qazvīnī, Sardār of Erevan: A Portrait of a Qajar Administrator". Iranian Studies. 9 (2/3). Cambridge University Press: 163–179. doi:10.1080/00210867608701513. JSTOR 4310229. (registration required)
- Bournoutian, George (1992). The Khanate of Erevan Under Qajar Rule: 1795–1828. Mazda Publishers. ISBN 978-0939214181.
- Bournoutian, George (2004). "Ḥosaynqoli Sardār-e Iravāni". In Yarshater, Ehsan (ed.). Encyclopædia Iranica. Vol. XII/5: Homosexuality III–Human migration II. London and New York: Routledge & Kegan Paul. pp. 519–520. ISBN 978-0-933273-79-5.
- Bournoutian, George (2016). "Prelude to War: The Russian Siege and Storming of the Fortress of Ganjeh, 1803–4". Iranian Studies. 50 (1). Taylor & Francis: 107–124. doi:10.1080/00210862.2016.1159779. S2CID 163302882.
- Bournoutian, George (2021). From the Kur to the Aras: A Military History of Russia's Move into the South Caucasus and the First Russo-Iranian War, 1801–1813. Brill. ISBN 978-9004445154.
- Daniel, Elton L. (2001). "Golestān Treaty". In Yarshater, Ehsan (ed.). Encyclopædia Iranica. Vol. XI/1: Giōni–Golšani. London and New York: Routledge & Kegan Paul. pp. 86–90. ISBN 978-0-933273-60-3.
- Pourjavady, Reza (2023). "Russo-Iranian wars 1804-13 and 1826-8". Christian-Muslim Relations. A Bibliographical History Volume 20. Iran, Afghanistan and the Caucasus (1800-1914). Brill.
- Tucker, Ernest (2012). "Afshārids". In Fleet, Kate; Krämer, Gudrun; Matringe, Denis; Nawas, John; Rowson, Everett (eds.). Encyclopaedia of Islam (3rd ed.). Brill Online. ISSN 1873-9830.
