= Siege of Erivan (1808) =

Siege during the Russo-Persian War in 1808

- Part of the Russo-Persian War of 1804–1813
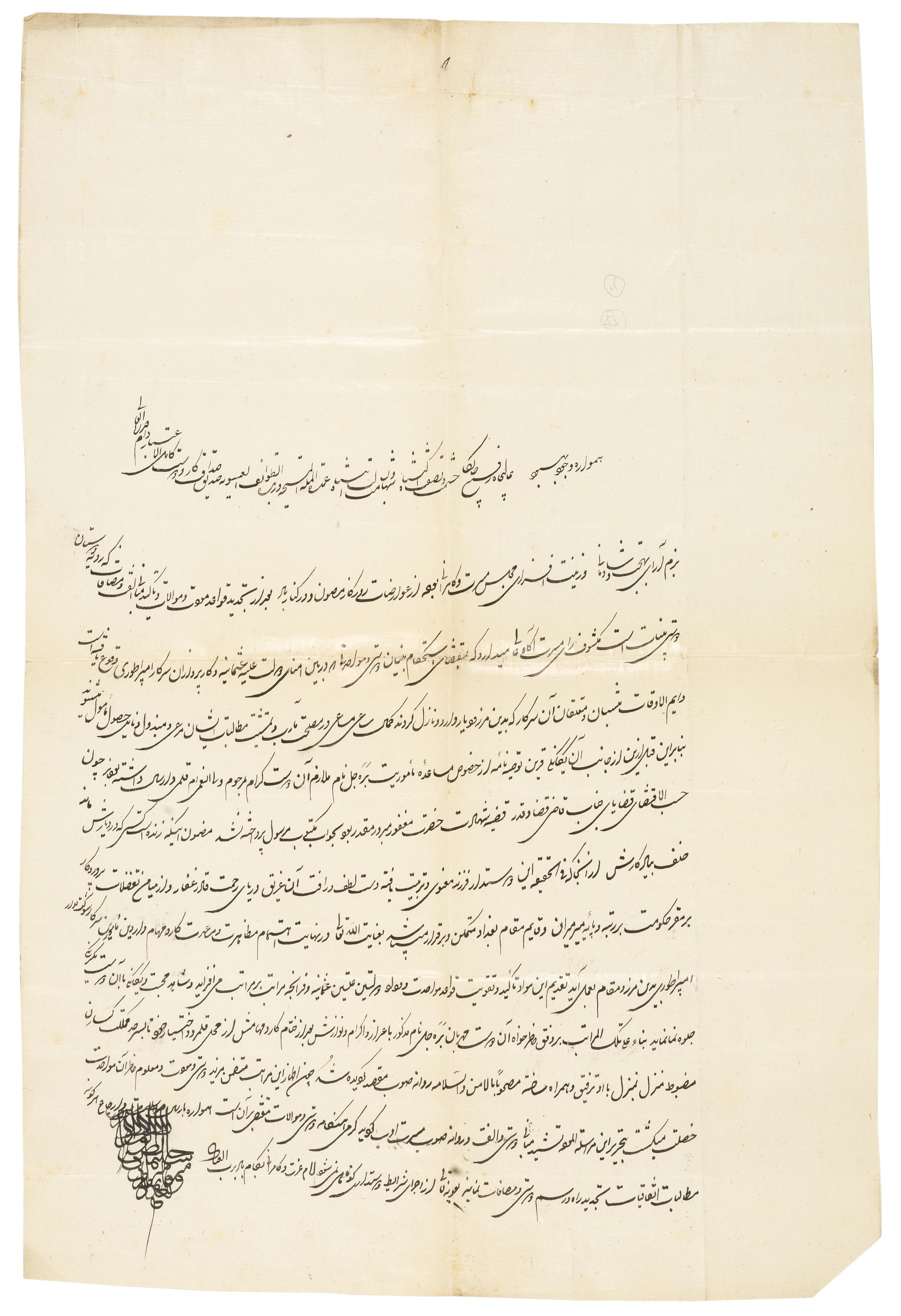
- Firman of Fath-Ali Shah Qajar to General Gardane wherein, amongst others, suggested military operations against the Russians are written, and an indication that the Shah expects Gardane to report shortly an end to hostilities and the capture of Field Marshal Gudovich, December 1808, dated November-December 1808
Date	October–November 1808
Location	Erivan, Qajar Iran (present-day Yerevan, Armenia)
Result	Iranian victory

Belligerents
Qajar Iran: Erivan Khanate	(Russia) Russian Empire

Commanders and leaders
Abbas Mirza; Hossein Sardar; Hasan Qajar	(Russian Empire) Ivan Gudovich

Strength
Unknown	Unknown

Casualties and losses
Unknown	3,000 casualties c. 1,000 killed

The siege of Erivan took place in October and November 1808, during the Russo-Persian War of 1804–1813. As in 1804, the Iranians successfully defended the city and forced the Russians to withdraw.

The Russian campaign, launched late in the season and poorly conceived and executed, failed after a six-week siege of the Iranian fortress of Erivan. The Russians had suffered 3,000 casualties with almost 1,000 deaths.

Russian field marshal Ivan Gudovich tried to excuse his defeat by claiming that French military officers had helped the Iranians, but Gudovich's superiors, as modern historian Alexander Mikaberidze explains, "knew better". Tsar Alexander I was severely dissatisfied; when he heard about Gudovich's failure, he named his expedition as "stupid", and without any sort of compassion, sent him into retirement.

== Sources ==
- Atkin, Muriel (1980). Russia and Iran, 1780-1828. University of Minnesota Press. ISBN 978-0816609246.
- Behrooz, Maziar (2013). "From confidence to apprehension: early Iranian interaction with Russia". In Cronin, Stephanie (ed.). Iranian-Russian Encounters: Empires and Revolutions Since 1800. Routledge. ISBN 978-0415624336.
- Kettenhofen, Erich; Bournoutian, George A.; Hewsen, Robert H. (1998). "EREVAN". Encyclopaedia Iranica. Vol. VIII, Fasc. 5. pp. 542–551.
- Mikaberidze, Alexander (2020). The Napoleonic Wars: A Global History. Oxford University Press. ISBN 978-0199951062.
