= Erivan Khanate =

Iranian khanate (1747–1828)

Erivan Khanate خانات ایروان Khānāt-e Iravān
- 1736–1828
- The Erivan Khanate in 1820
- Status: Khanate; Under Iranian suzerainty
- Capital: Yerevan
- Common languages: Persian (official), Armenian, Azerbaijani, Kurdish
- History
  - Established: 1736
  - Disestablished: 1828
| Preceded by | Succeeded by |
| Afsharid Iran | Armenian Oblast |

The Erivan Khanate (Note: Also spelled as "Iravan Khanate" or "Erevan Khanate") (Persian: خانات ایروان, romanized: Khānāt-e Iravān), also known as Chokhur-e Sa'd, (Note: The comparable administrative entity of the Safavid era, the Erivan Province, was also known as Chokhur-e Sa'd.) was a khanate (i.e., province) that was established in Afsharid Iran in the 18th century. It covered an area of roughly 19,500 km^{2}, and corresponded to most of present-day central Armenia, the Iğdır Province and the Kars Province's Kağızman district in present-day Turkey and the Sharur and Sadarak districts of the Nakhchivan Autonomous Republic of present-day Azerbaijan.

Following the death of Nader Shah in 1747, Iranian authority over the territories north of the Aras River was greatly weakened, and the Erivan Khanate became a tributary of King Heraclius II of Georgia. This arrangement persisted after Karim Khan Zand nominally restored Iranian authority in the South Caucasus. The Georgian king attacked the khanate multiple times when the khan attempted to avoid paying tribute. Like some of the other khans of the Caucasus, Mohammad Khan of Erivan sought to make contact with Russia after 1783, when Georgia became a Russian protectorate. In 1794–95, Agha Mohammad Khan Qajar campaigned to restore central authority in the region and received the submission of the khan of Erivan.

The provincial capital of Erivan was a center of the Iranian defenses in the Caucasus during the Russo-Iranian Wars of the 19th century. As a result of the Iranian defeat in the last Russo-Iranian War, it was occupied by Russian troops in 1827 and then ceded to the Russian Empire in 1828 in accordance with the Treaty of Turkmenchay. Immediately following this, the territories of the former Erivan Khanate and the neighboring Nakhchivan Khanate were merged to form the Armenian Oblast of the Russian Empire.

== History ==
=== Administration ===
Under Iranian rule, the kings (shahs) appointed various governors to preside over their domains, thus creating an administrative center. These governors usually carried the title of khan or beglarbeg, as well as the title of sardar ("chief"). Prior to the establishment of the khanate (i.e., province), the Iranians had used the Erivan Province (also known as Chokhur-e Sa'd) to govern roughly the same area. Both the Safavid-era province and the administrative entity of the Zand and Qajar eras were alternatively known by the name of Chokhur-e Sa'd. (Note: The name Chokhur-e Sa'd (چخور سعد) derives from the name of a 14th-century Turkic tribal leader, Amir Sa'd, whose followers were called Sa'dlu and settled in the plain of Surmalu and nearby areas in the territory of the future Erivan Khanate. Thus, the area where they settled was called Chokhur-e Sa'd (the first word is Azerbaijani çuxur 'pit, hole'), meaning 'Sa'd's pit/hole' or 'vale of Sa'd'. The term initially designated a much smaller area than the territory of the future province. The contemporary Armenian equivalent of this name was Sahata pos 'Sa'd's pit' or Yerkirn Sahatu 'Sa'd's land'. In 16th-17th-century Persian sources, Chokhur-e Sa'd was poetically reinterpreted as meaning 'happy pit'.)

The khans of Erivan enjoyed greater powers during their period of semi-independence from 1747 to 1795. Nominally, the khans were confirmed in their position by the Georgian king, to whom they paid tribute (see below), although in fact the office of khan had become hereditary. According to historian V. R. Grigoryan, in the second half of the 18th century the khans of Erivan "had almost royal powers", having taken control of all of the former divan lands (state lands administered by the chancery). Additonally, the tribute paid to the Georgian king was smaller than the taxes which had previously been paid to the shahs. However, another source cites the Armenian catholicos Simeon's statement made in 1765 that the khanate was obligated to pay heavy taxes both to the Zand ruler Karim Khan and to the Georgian king.

In the Qajar era, members of the royal Qajar dynasty were appointed as governors of the Erivan Khanate, until the Russian occupation in 1828. The heads of the provincial government of the Erivan Khanate were thus directly related to the central ruling dynasty. Administratively, the khanate was divided into fifteen administrative districts called mahals with Persian as its official language. The local bureaucracy was modeled on that of the central government, located in Tehran.

Together with the Nakchivan Khanate, the area made up part of Iranian Armenia (also known as Persian Armenia). (Note: Ordubad was added by the central government to the Nakhchivan Khanate in the early 19th century.) The Erivan Khanate made up the bulk of Iranian Armenia. The remaining fringes of historic Armenia under Iranian rule were part of the khanates of Karabakh and Ganja as well as the Kingdom of Kartli-Kakheti.

=== Afshar and Zand periods ===
After recovering the Iranian territories in the Caucasus from the Ottomans in 1735, Nader Shah (r. 1736–1747) organized the region into four khanates: Erivan, Nakhchivan (formerly a part of Chokhur-e Sa'd), Karabakh, and Ganja. According to the Armenian catholicos and historian Abraham III (r. 1734–1737), at the time of Nader's coronation at the Mughan plain the khan of Erivan was Mohammad Qoli (a Muslim of Armenian origin), who had been appointed by Tahmasp II (r. 1722–1732); but Nader soon appointed Pir Mohammad Khan from Herat as Khan of Erivan. Another contemporary source says that Nader appointed a trusted captain from his own bodyguard, Mohammad Reza Beg Khorasani, as governor of Erivan.

Nader's assassination in 1747 was followed by fifteen years of disorder in the region, which allowed some of the Turkic tribes in Iranian Armenia to reassert themselves. The Qajar tribe was strengthened in Erivan, Ganja, and Nakhichevan, while the Javanshir tribe took control of Karabakh. The Georgian king Heraclius II and the Javanshir khan of Karabakh Panah Ali allied with each other and divided Iranian Armenia into their own protectorates. According to some modern Azerbaijani historians, after Nader's death a local lord named Mir Mehdi Khan took power in Erivan and, in 1748, annexed some territory from the khanate of Urmia. (Note: Qarayev 2010 cites in this connection a Russian military report from 27 April 1748 which tells of a Mehdi Khan who joined the revolt of the people of Erivan against his own superior Amir Aslan Khan.)

In 1749, a vassal of the Afghan warlord Azad Khan named Mohammad Khan attacked the Erivan Khanate and besieged Erivan while plundering the surrounding territory. The khan of Erivan appealed to Heraclius of Kakheti and his father King Teimuraz II, offering to become their tributary in exchange for their assistance. Heraclius and Teimuraz defeated Mohammad Khan and drove him out of the Erivan Khanate. After this, the khan of Erivan was obligated to pay a yearly tribute to the Georgian kings. (According to another version, it was after an invasion by Azad Khan himself that this agreement was made.) The khan often tried to escape this obligation, and Heraclius campaigned against the Erivan Khanate several times to exact tribute. In June 1752, Azad Khan invaded the khanate and began plundering the country. Heraclius II arrived with an army and defeated Azad's forces at the battle of Kirk-Bulagh.

Historians give differing chronologies of the khans of Erivan in this period. According to one study, a certain Hoseyn Khan was Khan of Erivan in 1749 (when Mohammad Khan invaded), followed by Hasan Ali Khan Qajar in 1750. Then, an appointee of Heraclius II named Abdullah Khan reigned from 1750 to 1752. Azad Khan then called Abdullah Khan to a meeting and arrested him, replacing him with Hasan Ali Khan. The same year, Hasan Ali Khan was replaced by Khalil Khan, who was put in power by Azad Khan and reigned until 1755. During this time, the Erivan Khanate seems to have been under the effective rule of Azad Khan. In 1755, Hasan Ali Khan came to power for a third time, after which the position of khan remained hereditary for about half a century. Hasan Ali reigned until he was succeeded by his brother Hoseyn Ali c. 1759–60.

In 1753–54, the Erivan Khanate suffered greatly from raiding by Lezgi tribesman from the North Caucasus. By 1762, Karim Khan Zand had succeeded in reuniting Iran (excluding Khorasan) and reestablishing Iranian suzerainty over the khans of the Caucasus. Karim Khan took hostages from the khans' families to ensure their loyalty, but he did not meddle in Caucasian affairs. In 1765 and 1769, Heraclius II invaded the Erivan Khanate in response to Hoseyn Ali Khan's attempts to terminate payment of tribute. Both times, bloodshed was avoided through the mediation of the Armenian catholicos Simeon of Yerevan, and Heraclius accepted the restoration of the khanate's tributary status. Karim Khan's death in 1779 precipitated another power struggle in Iran, again leading to conflict between the rulers in the Caucasus. That year, Heraclius again invaded the Erivan Khanate, devastating the land and taking a large amount of booty and prisoners, although he was unable to capture Erivan Fortress.

=== Qajar period and cession to Russia ===
Hoseyn Ali Khan died in 1783 and was succeeded by his son Gholam Ali, who was assassinated soon after; he was succeeded by his younger brother Mohammad Khan. Like some of the other khans of the Caucasus, Mohammad Khan sought to make contact with Russia in the aftermath of the Treaty of Georgievsk. In 1794–95, Agha Mohammad Khan Qajar campaigned to restore central authority in the region. He received the submission of the khanates and forcibly subjugated Georgia. He had Mohammad Khan arrested and appointed his own brother Ali Qoli Khan to the position, although Agha Mohammad Khan's successor Fath-Ali (r. 1797–1834) reinstated Mohammad Khan after taking the throne. During the Qajar period, the city of Erivan was considered to be quite prosperous. After the Russians annexed Kartli-Kakheti and initiated the Russo-Persian War of 1804–1813, Erivan became, "once more", a center of the Iranian defenses in the Caucasus.

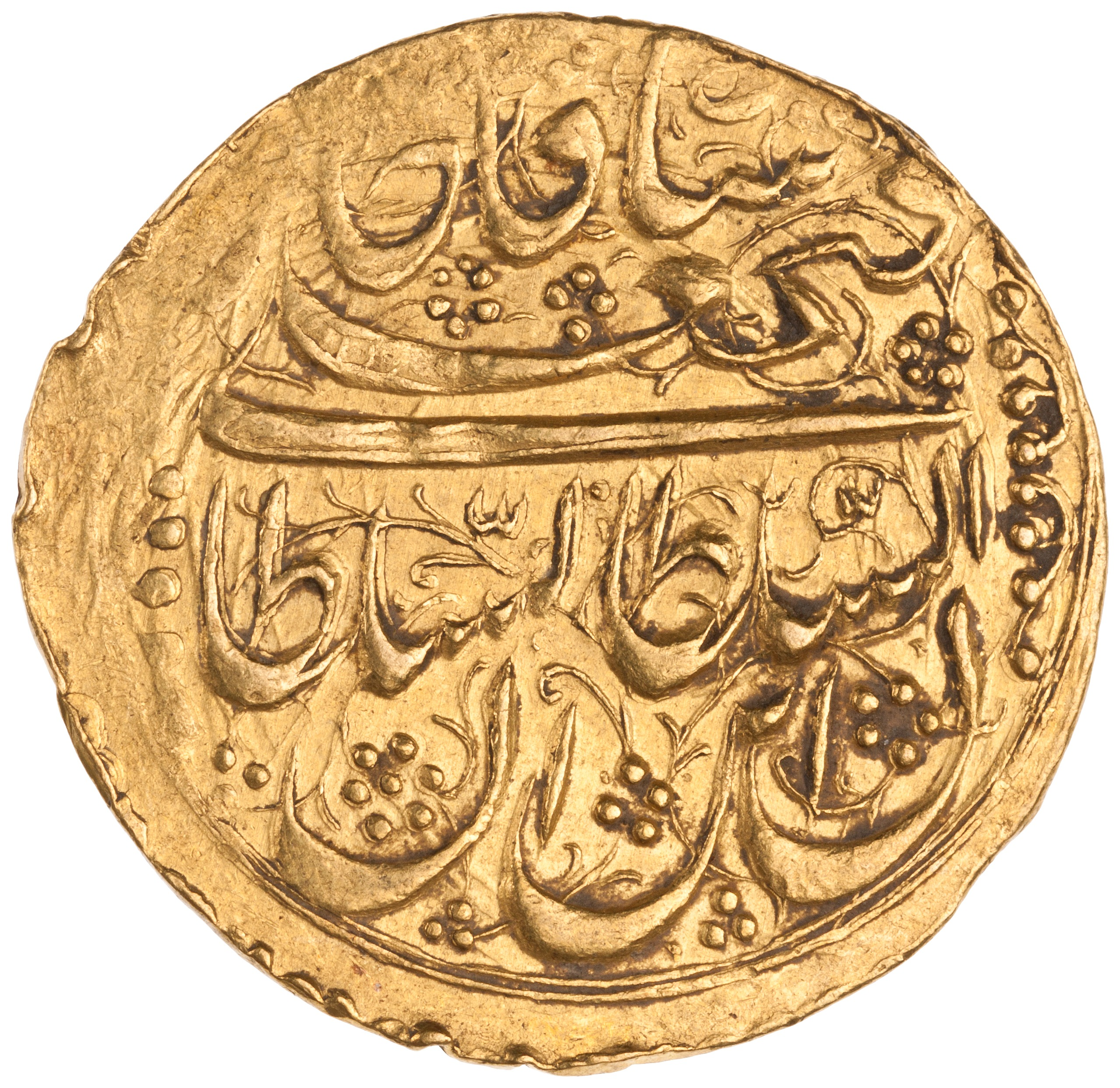
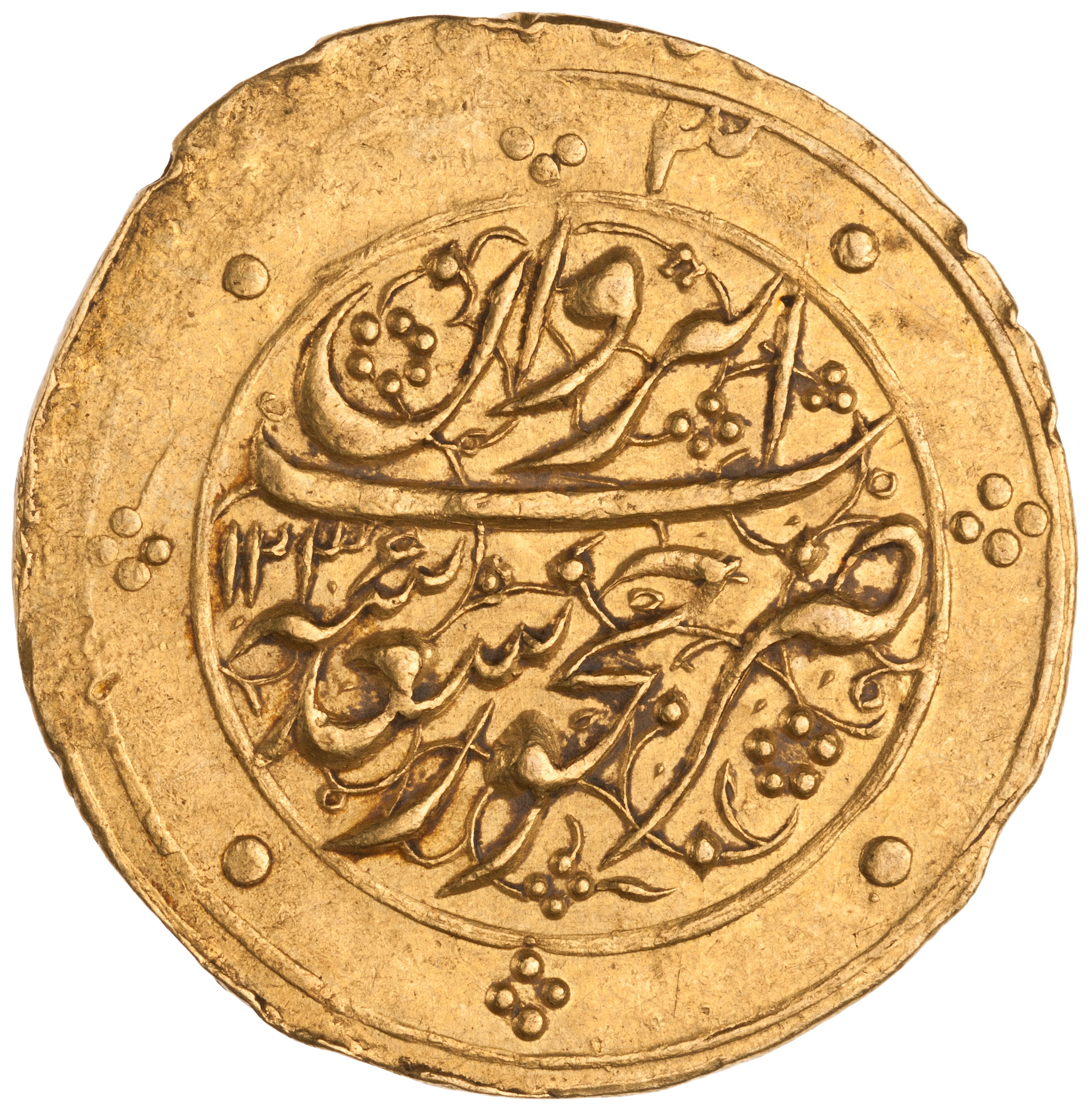
Gold coin of Fath-Ali Shah Qajar, struck at the Erivan mint, dated 1820/1 (obverse to the left, reverse to the right)

In 1804, Russian general Pavel Tsitsianov attacked Erivan, but a "superior" Iranian army, under the command of crown prince Abbas Mirza, repelled the attack. In 1807, the central Iranian government of King Fath-Ali Shah Qajar appointed Hossein Khan Sardar as the new governor (khan) of Erivan, and made him the commander-in-chief (hence, sardar) of the Iranian forces to the north of the river Aras. Hossein Khan Sardar was one of the most important individuals in the government of then incumbent king Fath-Ali Shah Qajar. A capable administrator, his long tenure as governor is considered to be an era of prosperity, during which he made the khanate a model province. His local bureaucracy, modeled on that of the central government in Tehran, was efficient, and restored the confidence of the local Armenians in the Iranian rule.

In 1808, the Russians, now led by general Ivan Gudovich, attacked the city once again; this attempt was repelled as well. By the Treaty of Gulistan (1813), which ended the 1804–1813 war, Iran lost most of its Caucasian territories; Erivan and Tabriz were now the main headquarters of the Iranian efforts to regain the territories lost to Russia.

About a decade later, in violation of the Treaty of Gulistan, the Russians invaded the Erivan Khanate. This sparked the final bout of hostilities between the two: the Russo-Persian War of 1826–1828. In the early stages of this war, the Iranians were successful in recovering many of the territories that were lost in 1813; however, the Russian offensive of 1827, in which the superior Russian artillery played a decisive role, resulted in the Iranians being defeated at Abbasabad, Sardarabad as well Erivan. Erivan was taken by the Russians on 2 October 1827. In February 1828, Iran was forced to sign the Treaty of Turkmenchay, which resulted in the cession of the khanate (as well as the other remaining territories to the north of the Aras River) to the Russians. After the fall of the Soviet Union, the Aras River became and has since remained the border between Iran and Armenia.

== Provincial capital ==
Erivan city was reportedly "quite prosperous" in the Qajar era. It covered roughly one square mile, whereas its direct environs (including gardens) further extended some eighteen miles. The city itself had three mahals, more than 1,700 houses, 850 stores, almost ten mosques, seven churches, ten baths, seven caravanserais, five squares, as well as two bazars and two schools. During the governorship of Hossein Khan Sardar, Erivan's fortifications were reportedly the strongest in the entire country. Its enormous fortress, which was located on "high ground" and was surrounded by thick walls, as well as moats and cannons, helped to prevent the Russian advance for some time. Of the city's two most prominent mosques, one was built in 1687 in the Safavid period, whereas the largest mosque of the city, the Blue Mosque, was built in the 18th century after the establishment of the khanate, and is considered to be a prominent architectural remnant of the era. The palace of the khan was situated nearby one of the mosques.

During Hossein Khan Sardar's governorship, Erivan's population steadily rose. Just before the Russian conquest, its population was approaching 20,000 inhabitants. In contrast, in 1897, some seventy years after the establishment of Russian rule, and with the Armenian resettlements, Erivan only had approximately 14,000 inhabitants. (Note: Reasons behind this were: the large Muslim migration primarily to Iran proper, higher taxes, the rise of Tiflis and Baku as new commercial centers in the region, the "cessation of the war economy" that had been initiated by the Iranians, and, of course, the end of Erivan's strategic importance.)

== Demographics ==
Ethnic map of the Erivan Khanate in 1828.

Per article III of the Treaty of Turkmenchay, the Iranians had to give the tax records of the lost territories in the Caucasus to the Russians. However, these records only represented the families that lived in these territories, as well as tax quotas (būniche), and thus were not an "accurate count" of the number of people that lived in these provinces, including Iranian Armenia.

The Russians therefore immediately conducted a thorough statistical account of the population of the Erivan Khanate, now renamed to the "Armenian Oblast". Ivan Chopin headed the survey team which gathered the administrative census (Kameral'noe Opisanie') for the newly established Russian administration in Erivan. Based on the Persian administrative records of the Erivan Khanate as well as interviews, the Kameral'noe Opisanie' is considered to be "the only accurate source for any statistical or ethnographical data" on the territories that comprised Iranian Armenia, on the situation before and immediately after the Russian conquest.

Muslims (Persian, Turkic groups and Kurds) formed an absolute majority in Iranian Armenia, comprising some 80% of the population, whereas Christian Armenians formed some 20% of the population. (Note: There were also a handful of Georgians, Jews, Circassians, some Russians, as well as some other peoples of the Caucasus; they were not of any statistical significance.) According to the Kameral'noe Opisanie', the settled and semi-settled Muslim population numbered more than 74,000. However, there are flaws regarding this number, as it does not account for the settled and semi-settled Muslims that left immediately after the Iranian defeat. For example, basically the entire Persian ruling elite and the military officer apparatus, "most of whom resided in the administrative centers", migrated to mainland Iran after the defeat. Furthermore, a number of the Turkic and Persian soldiers had perished in the 1826–1828 war, which lead to the Russian conquest of the Erivan and Nakchivan Khanates. According to estimations, some 20,000 Muslims had left Iranian Armenia or were killed during the 1826–1828 war. According to historian George Bournoutian, it can therefore be taken for granted that the combined Persian and Turkic (settled and semi-settled) population of Iranian Armenia amounted some 93,000, instead of 74,000.

The total Muslim population of Iranian Armenia (including semi-settled, nomadic, and settled), prior to the Russian invasion and conquest, amounted "roughly over" 117,000. Some 35,000 of these, were thus not present (i.e. emigration, killed during the war) after the Russians decisively arrived.

Demographic of the Erivan Khanate (1826)
| Ethnic Group | Count |
|---|---|
| Armenians (Note: Number includes the "few Gypsies of Erevan".) | 20,073 |
| Kurds | 25,237 |
| Persian elite/army (Note: The term "Persians" in this specific matter refers to the ruling hierarchy of the khanate, and does not necessarily denote the ethnic composition of the group. There were thus ethnic "Persians" and "Turks" among the ruling "Persian" elite of the khanate.) | 10,000 |
| Turkic groups (settled and semi-settled) (Note: Mentioned as "Turko-tatars" or "Turks". The khanate had a few Persian peasants, all of whom are included in this group.) | 31,588 |
| Turkic groups (nomads) (Note: Mentioned as "Turko-tatars" or "Turks".) | 23,222 |
| Total | 110,120 |

After the Russian administration took hold of Iranian Armenia, the ethnic make-up shifted, and thus for the first time in more than four centuries, ethnic Armenians started to form a majority once again in one part of historic Armenia. Some 35,000 Muslims of over 100,000 emigrated from the region, while some 57,000 Armenians from Iran and Turkey (see also; Russo-Turkish War of 1828–1829) arrived after 1828. Due to these new significant demographic shifts, in 1832, the number of Armenians had matched that of the Muslims. Anyhow, it would be only after the Crimean War and the Russo-Turkish War of 1877–1878, which brought another influx of Turkish Armenians, that ethnic Armenians once again established a solid majority in Eastern Armenia. Nevertheless, the city of Erivan remained having a Muslim majority up to the twentieth century. According to the Brockhaus and Efron Encyclopedic Dictionary, published in the final few decades of the Russian Empire, Russians made up 2%, Armenians 48% and Aderbeijani Tatars (Note: The term "Tatars", employed by the Russians, referred to Turkish-speaking Muslims (Shia and Sunni) of Transcaucasia. Unlike Armenians and Georgians, the Tatars did not have their own alphabet and used the Perso-Arabic script. After 1918 with the establishment of the Azerbaijan Democratic Republic, and "especially during the Soviet era", the Tatar group identified itself as "Azerbaijani". Prior to 1918 the word "Azerbaijan" exclusively referred to the Iranian province of Azarbayjan.) 49% of the population of Erivan in the 1890s. According to the traveler H. F. B. Lynch, the city of Erivan was about 50% Armenian and 50% Muslim in the early 1890s. H. F. B. Lynch thought that some among the Muslims were Persians when he visited the city within the same decade.

=== Persians ===
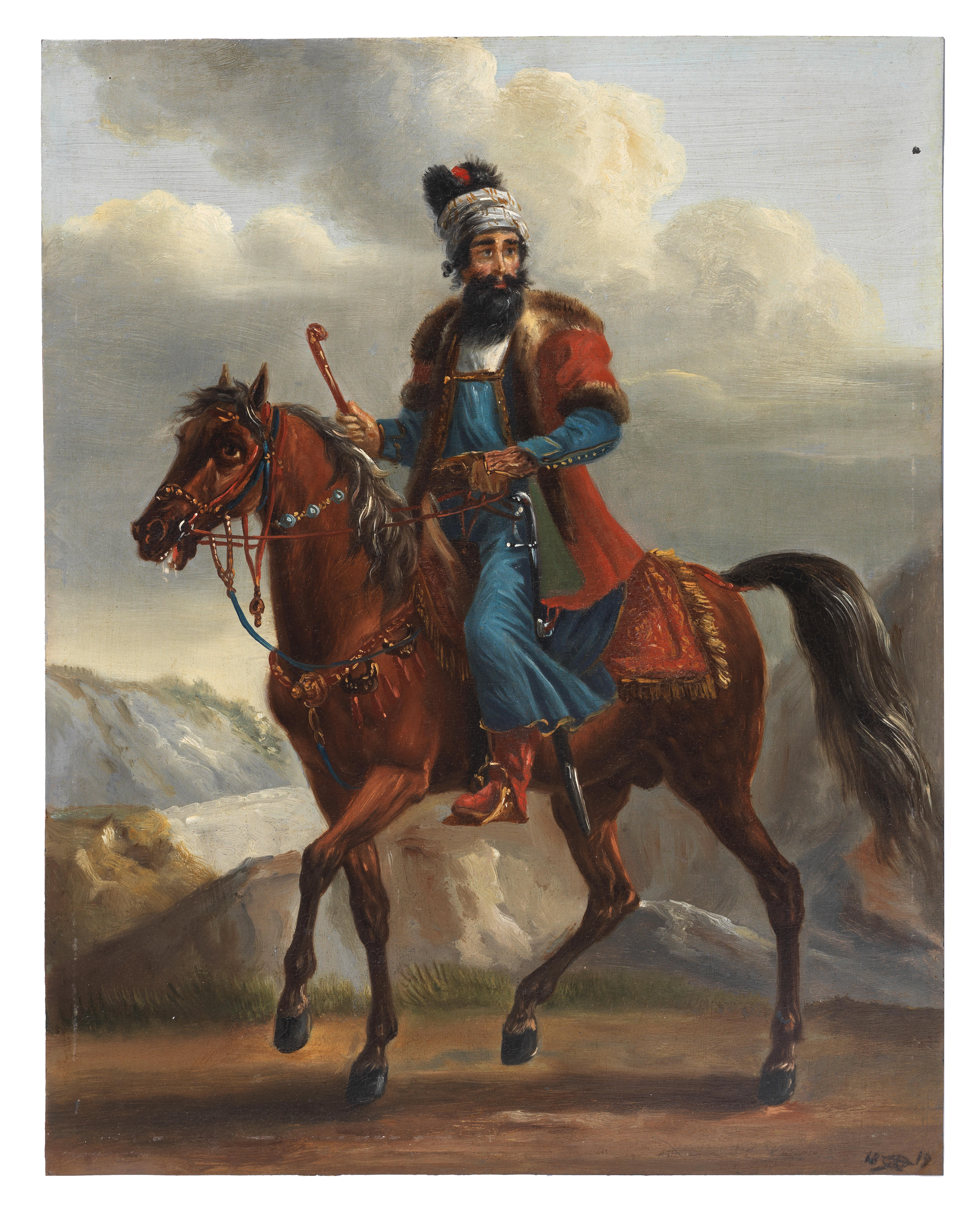
Hajji Mirza Esmail, a hokmran ("civil administrator") of the Erivan Khanate, on horseback. Hajji Mirza Esmail was sent by Fath-Ali Shah to the Erivan Khanate alongside the governor Hossein Khan Sardar. After the signing of the Treaty of Turkmenchay in 1828, he was forced to resign his post, evacuate Erivan and return to mainland Iran. Oil on tin panel, signed by Aleksander Orłowski, dated 1819

The Persians were the elite in the region, and were part of the settled population. The term "Persians" in this specific matter refers to the ruling hierarchy of the khanate, and does not necessarily denote the ethnic composition of the group. There were thus ethnic "Persians" and "Turks" among the ruling "Persian" elite of the khanate. This ruling elite were primarily the members of the governors' household, his close associates, the officer corps, the members of the local Persian bureaucracy, and some of the prosperous merchants. The Persian ruling elite was a minority among the Muslims in the khanate. During the 1826–1828 war, which lead to the Russian conquest, a number of the Persian ruling elite was killed; the remaining number, basically migrated "in toto" to Iran proper after the Russians decisively gained control of the province. (Note: Indeed, in his 1840 review of the statistical data in the "Overview of Russian Domain in the Transcaucasus" published in 1837, in response to the listing of Persians as an ethnic group residing in the Armenian Oblast, Ivan Chopin notes that there were no "Persians" in the province and that the Muslim population there was of either Turkic or Kurdish stock.)

=== Turkics ===
The Turkics (Note: Also variously referred to as "Turko-Tatars" or "Turks".) were the largest group in the khanate, but they were composed of three branches; settled, semi-settled, and nomadic. Similar to the Persian ruling elite, a number of them had perished in the 1826–1828 war against the Russians. The principal settled Turkic groups in the khanate were the Bayat, Kangarlu, Ayrumlu, Ak Koyunlu, Qara Qoyunlu, Qajars, as well as the "Turkified Qazzaqs" (i.e., Karapapakh). A large number of the Turkic groups, numbering some 35,000, were some sort of nomads. Alike the Kurds, some of the Turkic groups had specific areas where they moved to for summer and winter. The Turkic nomads were important to the local Persian governors for their animal husbandry, handicrafts and horses which they provided for the cavalry. The settled Turkics made up a large percentage of the workers in the agricultural sector. Together with the Kurds, the nomadic Turkic groups used about half the territory of the khanate for their pastoral way of life. There was rivalry between the leading Turkic groups. Due to the nomadic nature of many of the Turkic groups, they were located in many of the districts. They were abundantly presented in the central and northern parts of the khanate, where they "controlled the marginal grazing lands". There was a traditional sense of hostility between the Turkic nomads and the Kurds. The Karapapakh and the Ayrumlu were the largest Turkic nomad groups; most of them were resettled in Azerbaijan (historic Azerbaijan, also known as Iranian Azerbaijan) with the help of Abbas Mirza, after 1828.

=== Kurds ===
Regarding the Kurds, the Kameral'noe Opisanie lists more than 10,000 inhabitants (of various tribes), and notes that some 15,000 had migrated after the Russian annexation. The total Kurdish population (pre-war) would therefore amount over 25,000 individuals. The Kurds were nomadic by tradition, similar to a large number of the Turkic groups. Together with the nomadic Turkic groups, the Kurds used about half the territory of the khanate for their pastoral way of life. The Kurds were primarily of three religious affiliations; Sunni, Shia, and Yezidi. There was a traditional sense of hostility between the Kurds and the Turkic nomads.

=== Armenians ===
Christians Armenians formed a minority in the khanate, comprising some 20 percent of the population, and formed no majority in any of the mahals (districts). (Note: There is a chance that the Karbi-basar mahal, with the ecclesiastical center of Uch-Kilisa ("Etchmiadzin") could have had an Armenian majority.) The utter vast majority of the Armenians, some 80% of their total number, were located in the districts (mahals) of Kirk-Bulagh, Karbi-Basar, Surmalu, and Sardarabad. As with other minorities in Western Asia, they lived close to their "religious and administrative centers". There were also Armenians in the provincial capital of Erivan. There were reportedly no Armenians in the Sharur and Sa'dlu districts and only "very few" in Garni-Basar, Gökcha, Aparan, Talin, Sayyidli-Akhsakhli, and Vedi-Basar.

Many events had led to the demise of the Armenian population from the region. Until the mid-fourteenth century, Armenians had constituted a majority in Eastern Armenia. At the close of the fourteenth century, after Timur's campaigns, Islam had become the dominant faith, and Armenians became a minority in Eastern Armenia.

Shah Abbas I's deportation of much of the population from the Armenian Highlands in 1605 was one later event, when as many as 250,000 Armenians were removed from the region. To repopulate the frontier region of his realm, Shah Abbas II (1642–1666) permitted the Turkic Kangarlu tribe to return. Under Nader Shah (r. 1736-1747), when the Armenians suffered excessive taxation and other penalties, many emigrated, particularly to India.

Even though both Muslims and Armenians practiced various professions, it was the Armenians who dominated the trade and professions in the khanate. Thus, they were of major economic significance to the Iranian administration. Although the Armenians sympathised with the Christian Russians, they were indifferent to them as a whole; immediate concerns, both rural and urban Armenians, was limited to socio-economic "well-being". As long as the living conditions in the khanate were considered to be appropriate, the majority of Armenians felt no urge to take any actions. An example of this can be seen in 1808; when the Russians launched another siege in that year, in a 2nd attempt to take the city from the Iranians, the Armenians displayed "general neutrality".

==== Partial Armenian autonomy ====
Armenians in the territory of the Khanate lived under the immediate jurisdiction of the melik of Erivan, a position held by members of the Melik-Aghamalyan family. The melik of Erivan had the sole right to govern the Armenians of the khanate with the authorization of the shah. The inception of the melikdom of Erivan appears only after the end of the last Ottoman–Safavid War in 1639 and seems to have been a part of an overall administrative reorganization in Iranian Armenia after a long period of wars and invasions. The first known member of the family is a certain Melik Gilan but the first certain holder of the title of "melik of Erivan" was Melik Aghamal, and it may be from him that the house had taken its surname. One of his successors, Melik-Hakob-Jan, attended the coronation of Nader Shah in the Mughan plain in 1736.

Under the melik of Erivan were a number of other meliks in the khanate, with each mahal inhabited by Armenians having its own local melik. The meliks of Erivan themselves, especially the last, Melik Sahak II, were among the most important, influential and respected individuals in the khanate and both Christians and Muslims alike sought their advice, protection and intercession. Second in importance only to the khan himself, they alone among the Armenians of Erivan were allowed to wear the dress of an Iranian of rank. The melik of Erivan had full administrative, legislative and judicial authority over Armenians up to the sentence of the death penalty, which only the khan was allowed to impose. The melik exercised a military function as well, because he or his appointee commanded the Armenian infantry contingents in the khan's army. All the other meliks and village headmen (tanuters) of the khanate were subordinate to the melik of Erivan and all the Armenian villages of the khanate were required to pay him an annual tax.

== List of khans ==
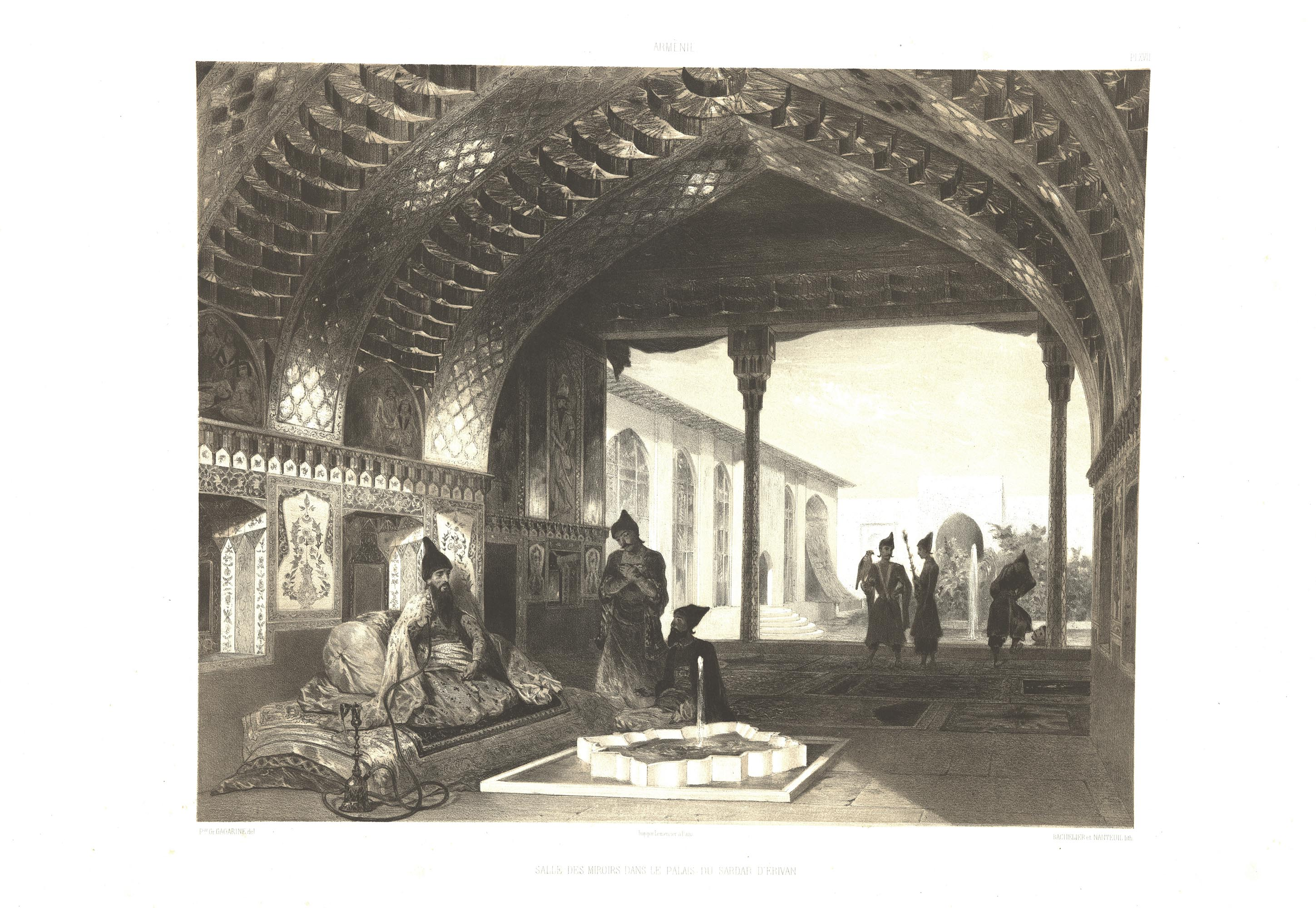
Palace of Erivan khans, early 19th-century painting

- 1736–? Pir Mohammad Khan (Note: The Armenian catholicos and historian Abraham III reports that Pir Mohammad Khan of Herat was appointed Khan of Erivan by Nader Shah at the Mughan plain in 1736.)
- 1747–52 Mir Mehdi Khan
- 1752–55 Khalil Khan Uzbek (Note: A different order is given in a study by Vahagn Hakobyan: a certain Hoseyn Khan was Khan of Erivan in 1749, followed by Hasan Ali Khan in 1750. Then, Abdullah Khan (appointee of Heraclius II of Georgia) reigned from 1750 to 1752. Hasan Ali Khan returned to power in 1752, only to be replaced the same year by Khalil Khan, who reigned until 1755. In 1755, Hasan Ali Khan came to power for a third time and reigned until he was succeeded by his brother Hoseyn Ali.)
- 1755–c. 1759–60 or 1762 Hasan Ali Khan Qajar
- 1762–83 Hoseyn Ali Khan (brother of Hasan Ali)
- 1783–84 Gholam Ali (son of Hasan Ali)
- 1784–1805 Mohammad Khan Qajar
- 1805–06 Mehdi Qoli Khan Qajar
- 1806–07 Ahmad Khan Moqaddam
- 1807–28 Hossein Qoli Khan Qajar

== In Azerbaijani historiography ==
From the mid-2000s, the concept of a "Western Azerbaijan", originally a colloquialism used by some Azerbaijani refugees to refer to the Armenian SSR of the Soviet Union, was merged into renewed interest of the Khanates of the Caucasus, in, what the historian and political scientist Laurence Broers explains as "wide-ranging fetishisation" of the Erivan Khanate as a "historically Azerbaijani entity".

Azerbaijani historiography regards the Erivan Khanate as an "Azerbaijani state" which was populated by autochthonous Azerbaijani Turks, and its soil is sacralised, as Broers adds, "as the burial ground of semi-mythological figures from the Turkic pantheon". In the process of employing historical negationism, it has undergone the same type of transformation within Azerbaijani historiography like the historic entity of Caucasian Albania before it. Within Azerbaijani historiography, the terms "Azerbaijani Turk" and "Muslim" are used interchangeably when dealing with the Erivan Khanate, even though contemporary demographic surveys differentiate "Muslims" into Persians, Shia and Sunni Kurds and Turkic tribes.

Broers regards this phenomenon in Azerbaijan as being part of a "Wide Azerbaijanism", a geopolitical confection emerging "at the meeting point of two previously subdued geographies made relevant by both sovereignty and the Armenian-Azerbaijan conflict" over Nagorno-Karabakh.

According to Broers, catalogues of "lost Azerbaijani heritage" portray an array of "Turkic palimpsest beneath almost every monument and religious site in Armenia – whether Christian or Muslim". Additionally, from around 2007, standard maps of Azerbaijan started to show Turkic toponyms printed in red underneath the Armenian ones on the major part of Armenia which it shows. In terms of rhetoric, as Broers narrates, the Azerbaijani palimpsest beneath Armenia "reaches into the future as a prospective territorial claim". The Armenian capital of Yerevan is particularly focused by this narrative; the Erivan Fortress and Sardar Palace, which had been demolished by the Soviets during their building of the city, have become "widely disseminated symbols of lost Azerbaijani heritage recalling the fetishised contours of a severed body part".

== See also ==
- Mirza Kadym Irevani
- Sardar Iravani
- Treaty of Turkmenchay
- Iranian Armenia (1502–1828)
- Islam in Armenia
- Islam in Azerbaijan

== Sources ==
- Abraham Kretats‘i (1999). The Chronicle of Abraham of Crete. Translated by George A. Bournoutian. Costa Mesa, CA: Mazda Publishers. ISBN 1-56859-082-2.
- Aliyev, Fuad; Hasanov, Urfan (2007) [Orig. published by Azərnəşr in 1997]. İrəvan xanlığı [The Yerevan khanate] (in Azerbaijani). Baku: Şərq-Qərb. ISBN 978-9952-34-166-9.
- Arsenyev, K. K.; Petrushevsky, F. F., eds. (1904). "Ėrivanʹ" Эривань. Ėntsiklopedicheskiĭ slovarʹ Brokgauza i Efrona Энциклопедический словарь Брокгауза и Ефрона [Brockhaus and Efron Encyclopedic Dictionary] (in Russian). Vol. XLI. pp. 14–16.
- Atkin, Muriel (1980). Russia and Iran, 1780–1828. Minneapolis: University of Minnesota Press. ISBN 978-0-8166-0924-6.
- Avery, Peter (1991). "Nādir Shāh and the Afsharīd legacy". In Avery, Peter; Hambly, Gavin R. G.; Melville, Charles Peter (eds.). The Cambridge History of Iran: From Nadir Shah to the Islamic Republic. Vol. 7. Cambridge: Cambridge University Press. pp. 3–62. ISBN 0-521-20095-4.
- Bournoutian, George A. (24–25 April 1980). The Population of Persian Armenia Prior to and Immediately Following its Annexation to the Russian Empire: 1826–1832. Nationalism and Social Change in Transcaucasia. Washington, D.C.: Wilson Center, Kennan Institute for Advanced Russian Studies.
- Bournoutian, George A. (1982). Eastern Armenia in the Last Decades of Persian Rule 1807–1828: A Political and Socioeconomic Study of the Khanate of Erevan on the Eve of the Russian Conquest. Undena Publications. pp. 1–290. ISBN 978-0890031223.
- Bournoutian, George A. (1992). The Khanate of Erevan Under Qajar Rule: 1795–1828. Mazda Publishers. pp. 1–355. ISBN 978-0939214181.
- Bournoutian, George A. (1997). "Eastern Armenia from the Seventeenth Century to the Russian Annexation". In Hovannisian, Richard (ed.). The Armenian People From Ancient to Modern Times, Volume II: Foreign Dominion to Statehood: The Fifteenth Century to the Twentieth Century. Macmillan. pp. 81–107. ISBN 0-333-61974-9.
- Bournoutian, George A. (2001). Armenians and Russia (1626-1796): A Documentary Record. Costa Mesa, California: Mazda Publishers. ISBN 1-56859-132-2.
- Bournoutian, George A. (2004). "Ḥosaynqoli Khan Sardār-e Iravāni". In Yarshater, Ehsan (ed.). Encyclopædia Iranica. Vol. XII/5: Homosexuality III–Human migration II. London and New York: Routledge & Kegan Paul. pp. 519–520. ISBN 978-0-933273-79-5.
- Bournoutian, George A. (2006). A Concise History of the Armenian People (5th ed.). Costa Mesa, California: Mazda Publishers. ISBN 1-56859-141-1.
- Bournoutian, George A. (2016). The 1820 Russian Survey of the Khanate of Shirvan: A Primary Source on the Demography and Economy of an Iranian Province prior to its Annexation by Russia. Gibb Memorial Trust. ISBN 978-1909724808.
- Bournoutian, George (2018). Armenia and Imperial Decline: The Yerevan Province, 1900-1914. Routledge.
- Bournoutian, George (2021). From the Kur to the Aras: A Military History of Russia's Move into the South Caucasus and the First Russo-Iranian War, 1801–1813. Brill. ISBN 978-9004445154.
- Brice, William Charles, ed. (1981). An Historical Atlas of Islam. Leiden: Brill. ISBN 9004061169.
- Broers, Laurence (2019). Armenia and Azerbaijan: Anatomy of a Rivalry. Edinburgh University Press. ISBN 978-1474450522.
- Ch[opin], I. (1840). Nekotorye zamechaniia na knigu Obozrenie rossiĭskikh vladieniĭ za Kavkazom Некоторые замечания на книгу Обозрение российских владений за Кавказом [Some notes on the book Survey of Russian territories beyond the Caucasus] (PDF). Saint Petersburg: Tipografiia A. A. Pliushara.
- Cronin, Stephanie, ed. (2013). Iranian-Russian Encounters: Empires and Revolutions since 1800. Routledge. ISBN 978-0415624336.
- Dowling, Timothy C., ed. (2015). Russia at War: From the Mongol Conquest to Afghanistan, Chechnya, and Beyond. ABC-CLIO. ISBN 978-1598849486.
- Floor, Willem M. (2008). Titles and Emoluments in Safavid Iran: A Third Manual of Safavid Administration, by Mirza Naqi Nasiri. Washington, DC: Mage Publishers. ISBN 978-1933823232.
- Grigoryan, V. R. (1958). Erevani khanutʻyuně 18-rd dari verjum (1780—1800) [The Khanate of Yerevan at the end of the 18th century (1780-1800)] (in Armenian). Yerevan: HSSṚ GA hratarakchʻutʻyun. OCLC 26759710.
- Hakobyan, T. (1971). Erevani patmutʻyuně (1500—1800 tʻtʻ.) [History of Yerevan (1500–1800)] (in Armenian). Erevani hamalsarani hratarakchʻutʻyun. OCLC 582481141.
- Hakobyan, Vahagn (2017). "Erevani khanutʻyuně 1749-1755tʻtʻ.-in" Երևանի խանությունը 1749-1755թթ.-ին [The Erivan Khanate in 1749-1755]. Arevelagitutʻyan hartsʻer = Journal of Oriental Studies (in Armenian) (13): 91–100.
- Hambly, Gavin (1991). "The traditional Iranian city in the Qājār period". In Avery, Peter; Hambly, Gavin; Melville, Charles (eds.). The Cambridge History of Iran. Vol. 7. Cambridge University Press. ISBN 978-0521200950.
- Katouzian, Homa (2003). Iranian History and Politics. Routledge. ISBN 978-0415297547.
- Kettenhofen, Erich; Bournoutian, George A.; Hewsen, Robert H. (1998). "Erevan". In Yarshater, Ehsan (ed.). Encyclopædia Iranica. Vol. VIII/5: English IV–Eršād al-zerāʿa. London and New York: Routledge & Kegan Paul. pp. 542–551. ISBN 978-1-56859-054-7.
- Kostikyan, K. P. (2008). Matenadarani parskeren vaveragrerě: hrovartakner Մատենադարանի պարսկերեն վավերագրերը. հրովարտակներ [Persian Documents of the Matenadaran: Decrees] (in Armenian). Vol. 4. Yerevan: Nairi.
- Lynch, H. F. B. (1901). Armenia: Travels and Studies. Volume I: The Russian Provinces. London: Longmans, Green, and Co.
- Olson, James S., ed. (1994). An Ethnohistorical Dictionary of the Russian and Soviet Empires. Westport, CN: Greenwood. ISBN 0313274975.
- Papazian, H. D. (1960). "Ōtar tirapetutʻyuně Araratyan erkrum (ZhE d.)" [Foreign rule in the Ararat region (15th c.)]. HSSṚ GA Teghekagir Hasarakakan Gitutʻyunneri = Bulletin of the Academy of Sciences of the Armenian SSR: Social Sciences (7–8): 21–40.
- Perry, John R. (2011). "Karim Khan Zand". In Yarshater, Ehsan (ed.). Encyclopædia Iranica. Vol. XV/6: Karim Khan Zand–Kašḡari, Saʿd-al-Din (Online ed.). Encyclopædia Iranica Foundation. pp. 561–564.
- Petrushevsky, Ilya Pavlovich (1949). Ocherki po istorii feodalʹnykh otnosheniĭ v Azerbaĭdzhane i Armenii v XVI — nachale XIX vv Очерки по истории феодальных отношений в Азербайджане и Армении в XVI — начале XIX вв. [Essays on the history of feudal relations in Armenia and Azerbaijan from the 16th century to the beginning of the 19th century] (in Russian). Leningrad: Izd-vo Leningradskogo gos. ordena Lenina univ. im. A. A. Zhdanova.
- Qarayev, Elçin (2010). İrəvan xanlığı (1747-1828) [The Yerevan Khanate (1747-1828)]. Baku: Avropa.
- Swietochowski, Tadeusz (2004). Russian Azerbaijan, 1905-1920: The Shaping of a National Identity in a Muslim Community. Cambridge University Press. ISBN 978-0521522458.
- Voskanian, V. K.; Galustian, Dzh. O.; Martirosian, V. M. (1978). Voskanian, V. K. (ed.). Armiano-russkie otnosheniia vo vtorom tridtsatiletii XVIII veka Армяно-русские отношения во втором тридцатилетии XVIII века (in Russian). Vol. III. Yerevan: Izdatelʹstvo AN Armianskoĭ SSSR.
