= Capture of Erivan =

Victory by Ivan Paskevich (Heritage Georgian)

Capture of Yerevan
- Part of the Russo-Persian War (1826–1828)
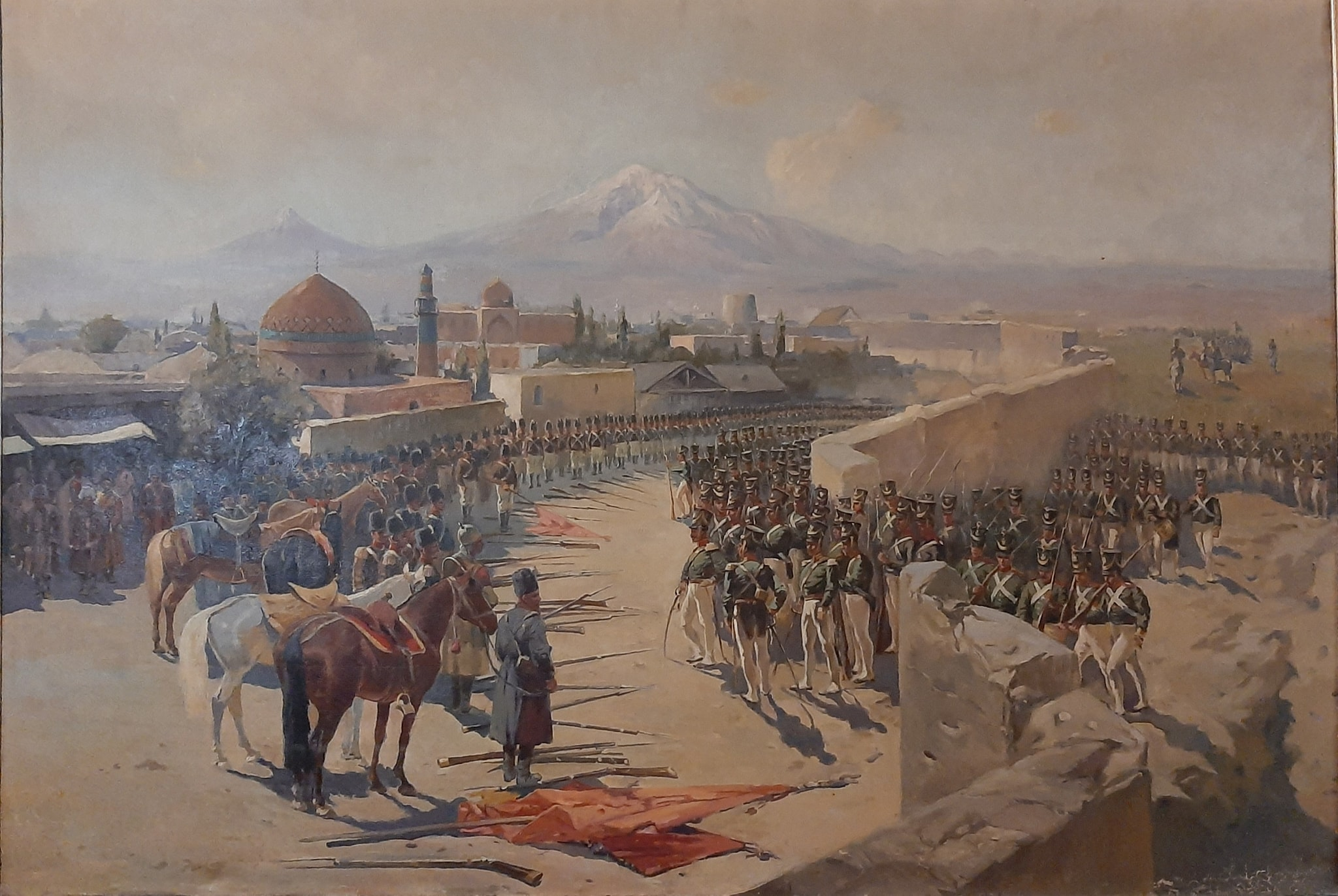
- Franz Roubaud's 1893 painting of the Yerevan Fortress siege in 1827 by the Russian forces under leadership of Ivan Paskevich
Date	1 October 1827
Location	Yerevan, Iran (now Armenia) 40°11′N 44°31′E
Result	Russian victory

Belligerents
(Russia) Russian Empire	Qajar Persia

Commanders and leaders
Ivan Paskevich; Roman Bagration	Abbas Mirza; Hossein Khan Sardar

Strength
8,600	6,000–7,000

Casualties and losses
1 officer and 8 soldiers killed; 2 officers and 44 soldiers wounded	4,000 prisoners

The capture of Erivan (or Erevan/Yerevan; Persian: فتح ایروان, romanized: Fath e Iravān; Russian: Взятие Эривани, romanized: Vzyatie Ėrivani) took place on 1 October 1827, during the Russo-Persian War of 1826–1828. The city fell to the Russians after being besieged for a week and opened up the path for the eventual capture of Tabriz, the second largest city in Iran and an important trading post.

== Background ==
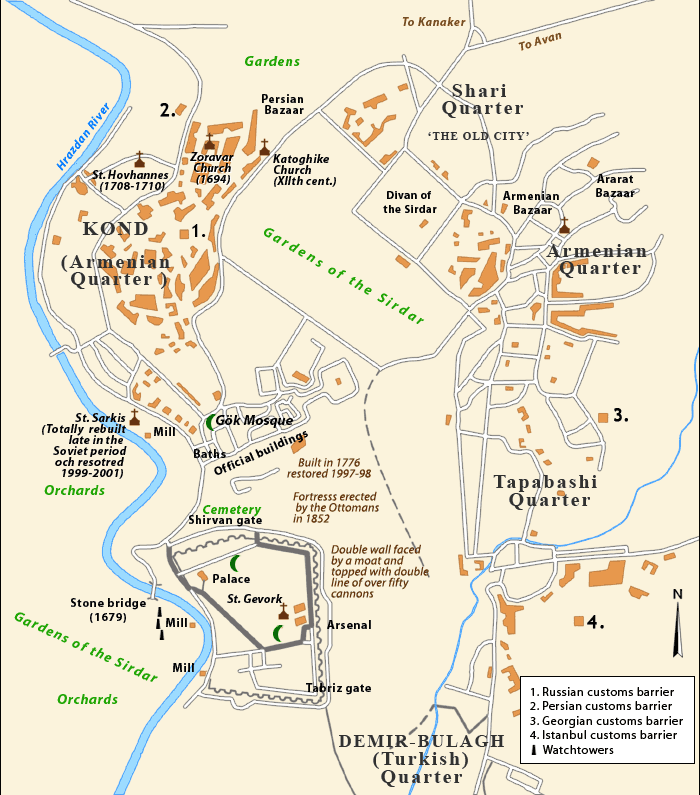
Plan of Yerevan in 1827 year.

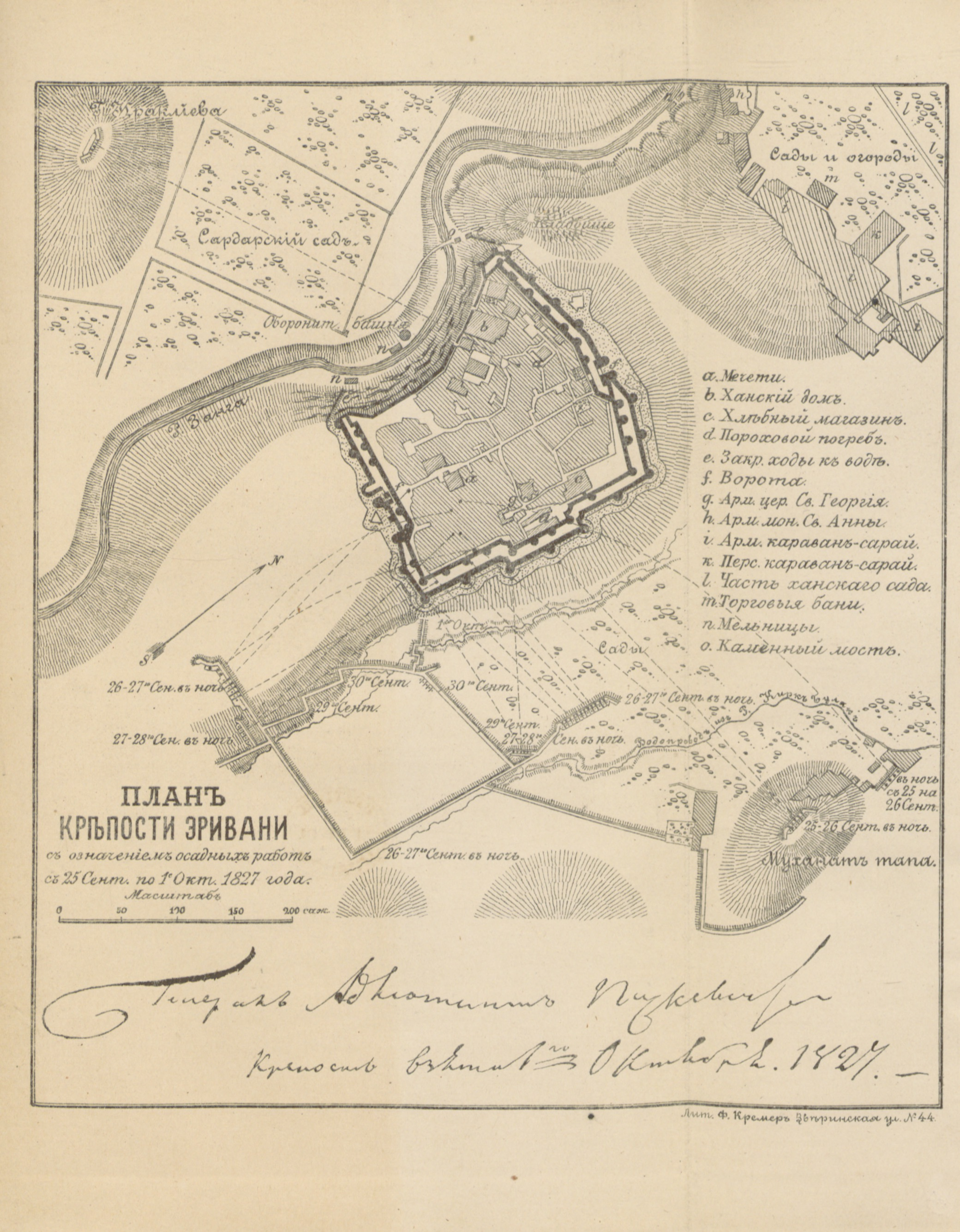
Plan of Erivan Fortress, 1827 by General Paskevich.

== Siege of Yerevan ==
When word reached Paskevich he abandoned any plans to move south and returned to Echmiadzin (5 September). Moving east he captured the fort of Serdar-Abad from the Persians and on 23 September appeared before the walls of Yerevan. Much of the siege work was directed by Pushchin [ru], a former engineer officer who had been reduced to the ranks for involvement with the Decembrists. When the place fell he was promoted to non-commissioned officer. Yerevan fell on 14 October. 4000 prisoners and 49 guns were taken and the Yerevan Khanate became a Russian province.

== Aftermath ==
As a result of the capture of Tabriz, the Shah Fath-Ali Shah Qajar sued for peace which resulted in the signing of the Treaty of Turkmenchay in 1828. Under the treaty, the Erivan Khanate (present-day Armenia) and Nakhichevan Khanate (present-day Azerbaijan) were ceded to the Russian Empire.

== Sources ==
- Kettenhoden, Erich; Bournoutian, George A.; Hewsen, Robert H. (1998). "EREVAN ii. The Persian Khanate.". Encyclopaedia Iranica, Vol. VIII, Fasc. 5. pp. 542–551.
