= Ahmad Khan Moqaddam =

Ahmad Khan Moqaddam (Persian: احمدخان مقدم) was the governor of the Iranian town of Maragheh in the early 19th century. He had been appointed governor during the reign of king (shah) Fath-Ali Shah Qajar (r. 1797–1834), and was the first member of the Moqaddam family to govern the town. His family was supposedly originally tribal leaders from the Caucasus, and had moved to Iran in the late 18th century. However, by the early 19th century, the family was a settled people, possessing a great number of villages.

Ahmad Khan also served as the beglarbeg (governor-general) of Tabriz and Khoy. In 1806, he was installed as the khan (governor) of the Erivan Khanate by the shah. However, a year later, he was replaced by Hossein Khan Sardar. In Maragheh, Ahmad Khan was succeeded by his son Hossein Pasha Khan in c. 1830.

== Sources ==
- Bournoutian, George (2021). From the Kur to the Aras: A Military History of Russia's Move into the South Caucasus and the First Russo-Iranian War, 1801–1813. Brill. ISBN 978-9004445154.
- Good, Mary-Jo Delvecchio (1977). "Social Hierarchy in Provincial Iran: The Case of Qajar Maragheh". Iranian Studies. 10 (3): 129–163. doi:10.1080/00210867708701529. JSTOR 4310267. (registration required)

Unknown	Governor of Maragheh; Early 19th century – 1830	Succeeded by Hossein Pasha Khan
Preceded by Mehdi Qoli Khan Qajar	Khan of the Erivan Khanate; 1806–1807	Succeeded by Hossein Khan Sardar
