= Hoseyn Ali Khan =

Khan of Erivan from 1759 to 1783

Khan of Erivan
- Reign: 1759 – 1783
- Predecessor: Hasan Ali Khan Qajar
- Successor: Gholam Ali-khan
- Died: November 9, 1783; Iravan, Zand Iran
- Issue: Gholam Ali-khan, Mohammad Khan, Sultanat-begum Qajar
- Father: Khalil Khan
- Religion: Twelver Shia Islam

Hoseyn Ali Khan (Persian: حسینعلی خان) was the khan (governor) of the Erivan Khanate from 1759 to 1783 and brother of the previous Hasan Ali Khan.

== Biography ==
He was born in Erivan in a family of khans and belonged to the Qovanlu branch of the Qajar tribe. The last khan, his brother Hasan Ali Khan, who ruled for four years died at the beginning of 1759 and was replaced by Hoseyn Ali Khan.

In domestic policy Hoseyn Ali Khan focused on the economic strengthening of the khanate and in foreign policy he wanted to achieve full independence for his khanate and life in peace with neighboring khanates.

However, in August 1760, the Dagestan troops moved to Yerevan. Hoseyn Ali Khan sent an army against them and in the battle that took place, the Dagestanis having been defeated, but having received additional assistance they reached the Aras river. When the Dagestani troops were returning after the end of the robberies they were suddenly attacked by the Georgian troops and defeated them. This event further strengthened the influence of the Kingdom of Kartli-Kakheti on the Erivan Khanate.

During his reign the borders of the Erivan Khanate were expanded even more and included the Sharur mahal (district).

At the same time Heraclius II of Georgia consistently made military campaigns against the Erevan Khanate in 1759, 1762-1765 and 1778–1779. Hoseyn Ali Khan, who knew the sympathies of the Armenians for Heraclius II after the departure of the Georgian army decided to punish them.

Gevorg Khubov, who witnessed this event, describes the khan's anger towards the Armenians in his memoirs:

The fate of those (Armenians) who remained in the Erevan fortress was deplorable. Thirty of them were severely punished by Hoseyn Ali Khan. Their property was looted and one Armenian was accused of treason and killed. Patriarch Simon was very angry seeing the fate of his people. He asked for forgiveness from these unfortunates, then the khan complied with his request and replaced the punishment with a fine.

Most of the fine was paid by patriarch Simon himself and some people began to suspect the patriarch of treason. According to archival materials, six monks of the Etchmiadzin Cathedral also were killed on the orders of Hoseyn Ali Khan.

However, having strengthened his power Hoseyn Ali Khan refused to pay taxes to the Georgian king. This led to the attack of Heraclius II on Yerevan with a large army in 1765. Due to the small number of his forces Hoseyn Ali Khan again agreed to a peace proposal and began to pay tribute, but after Heraclius II withdrew his troops from Yerevan the khan again refused to pay taxes. In 1769, Heraclius II attacked Yerevan again, but was defeated and retreated. Thus, the military campaigns of Heraclius II against the Erivan Khanate did not bring any results and he could not make the khanate dependent on himself.

Georgian raids on the khanate continued until November 1781, when a peace treaty was concluded between the Erivan khanate and the Kingdom of Kartli-Kakheti. Under the terms of the concluded agreement, Hoseyn Ali Khan undertook to pay taxes to Heraclius II in the amount of 30,000 Iranian toman per year. In addition the khan of Yerevan had to help Heraclius II with his army if necessary and subsequent khans had to be approved by the Georgian king. For his part Heraclius II undertook to protect the Erivan Khanate from enemies. As a result of the agreement, some of the surviving prisoners from Georgia were returned to Yerevan.

Hoseyn Ali Khan died on November 9, 1783, from an illness and was succeeded by his eldest son, 15-year-old Gholam Ali-khan.

== See also ==
- Gholam Ali-khan
- Erivan Khanate
- Erivan Governorate

== Sources ==
- Butkov P. G. (1869). "Материалы для новой истории Кавказа, с 1722 по 1803 год — Materials for the new history of the Caucasus, from 1722 to 1803". St. Petersburg.
- Melikset-Bey, Levon (1934). Georgian sources about Armenia and Armenians (in Armenian). Vol. 2. Yerevan. p. 60.
- Grigoryan V. R. (1958). Erivan khanate at the end of the 18th century (1780–1800) (in Armenian). Yerevan. p. 60, 72.
- Qarayev, Elçin (2016). Azərbaycanın İrəvan bölgəsinin tarixindən (XVII yüzilliyin sonu–XIX yüzilliyin ortalarında). Baku: Institute of History of Azerbaijan National Academy of Sciences. p. 83–84
