= Mohammad Khan Qajar of Erivan =

Khan of Erivan from 1784 to 1805

Mohammad Khan Qajar

Khan of Erivan
- In office 1784–1805
- Monarchs: Ali-Morad Khan Zand, Jafar Khan, Sayed Morad Khan, Lotf Ali Khan, Agha Mohammad Khan Qajar, Fath-Ali Shah Qajar
- Preceded by: Gholam Ali-khan
- Succeeded by: Mehdi Qoli Khan Qajar

Personal details
- Spouse: Zinat al-Doulah (daughter of Fath-Ali Shah)
- Children: Mohammad Hassan Khan Iravani; Hossein Khan Sardar
- Parent: Hoseyn Ali Khan (father)

Mohammad Khan Qajar (Persian: محمدخان قاجار) was the khan (governor) of the Erivan Khanate from 1784 to 1805.

== First reign and imprisonment ==
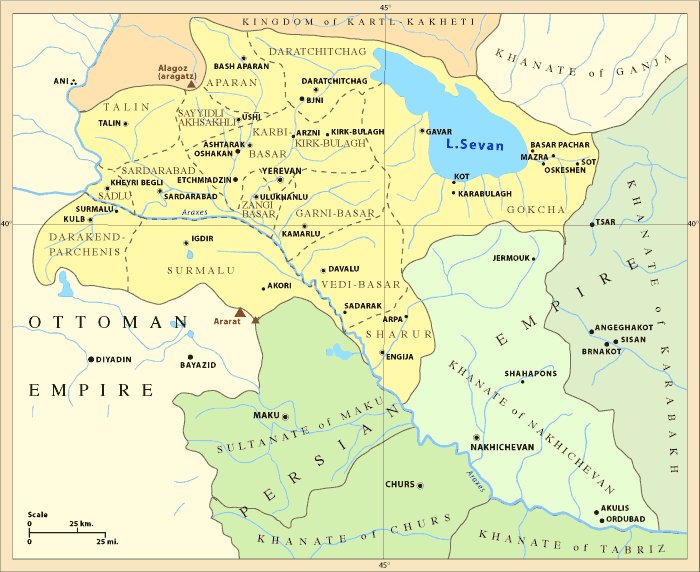
The Erivan Khanate and its surroundings in c. 1800

Mohammad Khan of Erivan belonged to the Qovanlu branch of the Qajar tribe. He was the son of Hoseyn Ali Khan of Erivan and a Christian woman from Tiflis (Tbilisi). He was twelve years old when his brother, Gholam Ali, was assassinated in a conspiracy after less than a year as Khan of Erivan. The conspiracy was the work of disaffected officials who had been sidelined by Gholam Ali in favor of his relatives; agents of the Georgian king Heraclius II (r. 1762–1798) of Kartli-Kakheti are also thought to have been involved in the coup. Mohammad Khan's mother served as his regent until he came of age.

In order to preserve his realm, he acknowledged the suzerainty of Heraclius II. He also rejected overtures from the Ottoman sultan, who promised assistance if he would ally with the neighboring khans against Heraclius, who had accepted Russian protection in 1783. He then faced a rebellion by supporters of his predecessor, Gholam Ali Khan. The rebels caused devastation and were defeated only after Heraclius's troops arrived to assist Mohammad Khan. In 1785, Umma Khan of Avaria, encouraged by the Ottomans, raided Heraclius's kingdom with a 20,000 strong army, causing great panic in the Erivan Khanate. The khanate's inhabitants twice fled their homes to take refuge in fortified places. Although Heraclius soon made peace with Umma Khan, various forces in the Erivan Khanate took advantage of Mohammad Khan's weakness to vie for power, causing further devastation in the territory.

In 1795, Agha Mohammad Khan Qajar (r. 1789–1797), who in the previous years had established his rule over much of Iran, began preparations for a campaign to restore Iranian control over the South Caucasus. As news of the imminent campaign spread, many inhabitants of the region fled towards Georgia, with many dying of disease or starvation. Mohammad Khan prepared for a siege, reportedly stationing 7,000 soldiers in the Erivan Fortress and storing enough supplies to last seven years. Agha Mohammad Khan's 50,000 strong army crossed the Aras in June 1795; a detachment of 20,000 men, commanded by Agha Mohammad Khan's three brothers, was sent against Erivan. Mohammad Khan moved the population of the city of Erivan and its surroundings to the citadel. The siege of Erivan began in late July 1795 and lasted thirty-five days. During that time, the enemy army caused great destruction in the settlements of the khanate. The population of Erivan showed fierce resistance and hoped that Heraclius would arrive with help, although he was focused on defending his own kingdom and was unable to do so. Mohammad Khan delayed his response to Agha Mohammad Khan's demand for submission, but he eventually decided that further resistance was futile. He accepted Agha Mohammad Khan's overlordship and gave his wife and newborn son as hostages.

In order to supervise Mohammad Khan, Agha Mohammad Khan appointed one of his men as commandant of Erivan Fortress, supported by 400 soldiers. During the Russian expedition into the Caucasus in 1796, Agha Mohammad also sent his brother, Ali-Qoli, to Erivan; according to Vardan Grigorian, this was to block Erivan's increasing aspirations to accept Russian rule. It is likely that the Shah found out about Mohammad Khan's communications with the Russian military, in which the Khan asked for assistance to free himself from Iranian rule. Mohammad Khan sent one of his men with gifts to the Shah in order to regain his trust, but the delegate was received badly and returned.

In early 1797, the Shah was preparing another campaign in the South Caucasus, as Shusha in the Karabakh Khanate remained unconquered. He demanded troops and artillery from Mohammad Khan for the campaign. In January 1797, Mohammad Khan sent a letter to Count Valerian Zubov, the commander of the 1796 expedition, asking for help; but the Russian troops had received orders to leave the South Caucasus since the death of Catherine the Great and the accession of Paul I (r. 1796–1801), and Mohammad Khan received a negative answer. According to Yegor Khubov, an Armenian go-between for the Russians and the khans of the Caucasus, the Shah ordered Mohammad Khan to come to the capital for Nowruz and to bring his treasures with him. When Mohammad Khan, along with Kalb-Ali Khan Kangarlu of Nakhichevan, arrived at the royal court with rich gifts, the Shah accused them of treason. According to Khubov, the Shah would have had Mohammad Khan killed if some of the Shah's high-ranking officers had not interceded on the Khan's behalf. Kalb-Ali Khan was blinded on the Shah's orders, and Mohammad Khan was imprisoned and his property was confiscated. George Bournoutian writes that it was because of their shared Qajar ancestry that the Shah spared Mohammad Khan (Mohammad Khan was Agha Mohammad's maternal cousin).

== Second reign and dismissal ==
Agha Mohammad Khan was killed in Karabakh in 1797, and his successor, Fath-Ali Shah Qajar (r. 1797–1834), sent Mohammad Khan back to Erivan to continue as its governor. In late 1798, Fath-Ali Shah gave Mohammad Khan a firman (royal decree) permitting him to rule Erivan, demanding in exchange a large sum (equivalent to 20,000 rubles) and the giving of hostages. As Mohammad Khan did not want to pay the sum, he began negotiations with Georgia. His recalcitrance provoked Fath-Ali to send the crown prince, Abbas Mirza, and the commander Soleyman Khan against him and the rebellious khan of Khoy in mid-1799. Mohammad Khan sent his troops to join those of Khoy, but the khans were defeated and Khoy was conquered. In the spring of 1800, Abbas Mirza's army set out for Erivan from Tabriz, despite Russian attempts to dissuade Fath-Ali from another campaign in the South Caucasus. Mohammad Khan again appealed to the Russians and the Georgians for assistance, and both King George XII of Georgia and the Russian minister Kovalensky promised to help. The Qajar army besieged Erivan, but because of their lack of artillery they were unable to take the fortress; the Khan's troops even made several sorties and attacked the besiegers. Eventually, Mohammad Khan agreed to pay a fine and Abbas Mirza lifted the siege.

Less than a month after Abbas Mirza's departure, Mohammad Khan sent troops to take Shoragel from the Georgians. He was not deterred when George XII sent a force of 400 men commanded by Pavel Tsitsianov to protect the region; the Khan's troops defeated the Georgian force and captured and destroyed the fortress of Shoragel. Mohammad Khan also desired to conquer Pambak, which had earlier been granted to him by Agha Mohammad Khan. To prevent this from happening, Russian troops approached the border of the Erivan Khanate, and Mohammad Khan was forced to abandon his plan. According to Grigorian, Mohammad Khan's real goal was to be independent of the Shah, the Russians, and the Georgians—his professed desire for Russian protection notwithstanding. Although Mohammad Khan was not noted for being courageous, he was skilled in politics and maintained contact with the Russians and Ottomans, while also guaranteeing Iran his allegiance.

On March 23/24, 1801, the Russian emperor Paul I died and was succeeded by his son Alexander I (r. 1801–1825). He installed Knorring as the governor of Georgia and instructed him to persuade various khanates that Fath-Ali Shah's authority had not yet been established in—such as Erivan, Ganja, Shakki, Shirvan, and Baku—to request Russian protection. This demonstrates that Alexander, unlike his father, sought to conquer the entire area between the Aras and Kur rivers. Russian soldiers were now permanently stationed in Tiflis and were prepared to advance to the banks of the Aras River. Because Javad Khan of Ganja remained faithful to the Shah, the Russian general Ivan Petrovich Lazarev attempted to sway Mohammad Khan of Erivan and Kalb-Ali Khan of Nakhichevan to the Russian side. Although both khans at first reacted positively to this, they ultimately declined.

Political map of the Caucasus and its surroundings between 1795 and 1801

In January 1802, rumours circulated that Fath-Ali Shah had sent one of his commander to Tabriz to prepare for an invasion of Nakhichevan and the removal of Kalb-Ali Khan from his post. If Mohammad Khan of Erivan did not yield to the Shah, the commander his men were to advance to Erivan and then wait for the Shah and the rest of the Iranian forces to appear. Several other rumours also later circulated, such as the planned Iranian siege of Erivan and attack on Tiflis. None of these rumours turned out be true, as other events had caught the attention of the Shah; the Wahhabi sack of Karbala, the third campaign in Khorasan, and the murder of the Iranian envoy Hajji Khalil Khan in Bombay (now Mumbai). Fath-Ali Shah was busy with these matters from March 1802 to March 1803.

On April 21, 1802, Knorring was back in Tiflis. Under the emperors orders, Knorring was to convince the khans of Erivan and Ganja to accept Russian garrisons, in order to protect Georgia from a possible Iranian invasion. During this period Mohammad Khan of Erivan had remained in his fortress, whilst sending contradictory messages to the Shah and Lazarev, declaring his allegiance to both. Lazarev replied back, stating that he needed Knorring's permission to negotiate. Mohammad Khan of Erivan's emissary stayed in Tiflis until receiving Knorring's reply. The latter soon replied, urging Mohammad Khan of Erivan to send a formal request with an official signature and seal to the emperor, so that Erivan could be put under Russian protection.

In 1805, Mohammad Khan of Erivan was dismissed to Iran by the Shah due to his interactions with Russia during and after the siege of Erivan. He was succeeded by Mehdi Qoli Khan Qajar.

Mohammad Khan's son, Hossein Khan Sardar, served as the last khan of Erivan from 1807 to 1827. His daughter, selected by Fath-Ali Shah himself, married prince Mahmud Mirza, Fath-Ali Shah's fifteenth son, and became his chief wife.

== Sources ==
- Bournoutian, George (2004). "Ḥosaynqoli Khan Sardār-e Iravāni". In Yarshater, Ehsan (ed.). Encyclopædia Iranica. Vol. XII/5: Homosexuality III–Human migration II. London and New York: Routledge & Kegan Paul. pp. 519–520. ISBN 978-0-933273-79-5.
- Bournoutian, George (2016). "Prelude to War: The Russian Siege and Storming of the Fortress of Ganjeh, 1803–4". Iranian Studies. 50 (1): 107–124. doi:10.1080/00210862.2016.1159779.
- Bournoutian, George (2021). From the Kur to the Aras: A Military History of Russia's Move into the South Caucasus and the First Russo-Iranian War, 1801–1813. Brill. ISBN 978-9004445154.
- Bournoutian, George A. (1992). The Khanate of Erevan Under Qajar Rule: 1795–1828. Costa Mesa, CA: Mazda Publishers. ISBN 978-0939214181.
- Brookshaw, Dominic Parviz (2006). "Maḥmud Mirzā". In Yarshater, Ehsan (ed.). Encyclopædia Iranica (Online ed.). Encyclopædia Iranica Foundation.
- Grigorian, V. R. (1958). Erevani khanutʻyuně 18-rd dari verjum (1780—1800) Երևանի խանությունը 18-րդ դարի վերջում (1780—1800) [The Khanate of Yerevan at the end of the 18th century (1780-1800)] (in Armenian). Yerevan: HSSṚ GA hratarakchʻutʻyun. OCLC 26759710.
- Grigorian, V. R. (1972). "Hay-ṛusakan haraberutʻyunnerě XVIII dari 80—90-akan tʻvakannerin" Հայ-ռուսական հարաբերությունները XVIII դարի 80—90-ական թվականներին [Armenian-Russian relations in the 80s and 90s of the 18th century]. In Aghayan, E. B.; et al. (eds.). Hay zhoghovrdi patmutʻyun Հայ ժողովրդի պատմություն (in Armenian). Vol. 4. Yerevan: HSSH GA hratarakchʻutʻyun. pp. 219–246.

Preceded by Gholam Ali-khan	Khan of the Erivan Khanate; 1784–1805	Succeeded by Mehdi Qoli Khan Qajar
