= Khalil Khan Uzbek =

Khan of Erivan from 1752 to 1755

Khan of Erivan
- Reign: 1752 – 1755
- Predecessor: Mehdi-Khan Qasemlu
- Successor: Hasan Ali Khan Qajar
- Born: unknown
- Died: unknown

Khalil Khan Uzbek (Persian: خلیل خان ازبک) was the khan (governor) of the Erivan Khanate from 1752 to 1755.

== Biography ==
Taking advantage of the weakening of the power of the previous Mir-Mehdi Khan, Fath-Ali Shah decided to capture Yerevan. Under the leadership of Azad Khan a 30.000-strong army was sent to Yerevan in 1751 and a detachment of these troops besieged the Erivan fortress. The Georgian king did not miss the opportunity and moved to the city for protection, but the troops of Heraclius II were defeated in the battle. Thus, Mehti Khan was removed from power and Khalil Khan Uzbek was appointed as the khan of Yerevan in 1752.

During the reign of Khalil Khan, the Erivan Khanate was heavily attacked by the Dagestanis. In 1754–1755, the Dagestan troops, led by the Avar Khan Muhammad Nutsal IV, moved to the territory of Kartli-Kakheti and from there attacked the Erivan Khanate.

This devastating invasion of the Dagestan troops greatly lowered the reputation of Khalil Khan among the people. In 1755, an uprising broke out under the leadership of Hasan Ali Khan Qajar, who had great influence among the people. As a result of the uprising, Khalil Khan was removed from power, Hasan Ali Khan came in his place.

== See also ==
- Hasan Ali Khan Qajar
- Erivan Khanate
- Erivan Governorate

== Sources ==
- Əliyev, Fuad; Həsənov, Urfan (2007). Erivan Khanate. Baku: Şərq-Qərb (East-West). p. 90. ISBN 978-9952-34-166-9
- Sərdariniya, Sərdariniya (2014). İrəvan müsəlman sakinli vilayət olmuşdur. Baku: Zərdabi. p. 64. ISBN 978-9952-8010-1-9
- Qarayev, Elçin (2016). Azərbaycanın İrəvan bölgəsinin tarixindən (XVII yüzilliyin sonu–XIX yüzilliyin ortalarında). Baku: Mütərcim. pp. 58–59.
