= Gholam Ali-khan =

Khan of Erivan from 1783 to 1784

Khan of Erivan
- Reign: 1783 – 1784
- Predecessor: Hoseyn Ali Khan
- Successor: Mohammad Khan Qajar of Erivan
- Father: Hoseyn Ali Khan
- Religion: Shia Islam

Gholam Ali-khan (Persian: غلام علی) was the khan (governor) of the Erivan khanate, who came to power at the age of 15 and ruled for 8 months from 1783 to 1784. The eldest son of the past Hoseyn Ali Khan.

== Biography ==
He was born in Yerevan in a family of khans and belonged to the Qovanlu branch of the Qajar tribe. After the death of his father, the previous khan, his coming to power in the Erivan khanate was unequivocally assessed by the Yerevan nobility, because they considered him not so reliable. While Gholam Ali-khan was busy with the funeral of his father one of the local nobles Usmi-bey rebelled and captured the Erivan fortress, but he was suppressed with the help of the former supporters of the late Hoseyn Ali Khan.

The eight-month reign of Gholam Ali-khan is one of the most controversial periods of the Erivan Khanate. Taking advantage of the fact that he was very young and inexperienced Russian and Ottoman empires tried to win him over to their side. If his father took a neutral position between the two sides, then during the reign of Gholam Ali-khan the Erevan khanate approached the Ottoman Empire, which was worried that the Georgian king Heraclius II might seize the khanate.

To attract Gholam Ali-khan to his side sultan Abdul-Hamid I honored him with the post of beylerbey and at the same time the Ottoman pashas were ordered to provide him with comprehensive assistance in difficult times.

In the summer of 1784, a conspiracy was organized against Gholam Ali-khan, and as a result of which he was killed. After the assassination, the majority of the population of Yerevan chose his brother Mohammad Khan.

== See also ==
- Mohammad Khan
- Erivan Khanate

== Sources ==
- Fuad Əliyev, Urfan Həsənov. Erivan khanate. Baku: "Şərq-Qərb". 2007. p. 144. ISBN 978-9952-34-166-9
