= Mehdi-Khan Qasemlu =

Khan of Erivan from 1747 to 1752

Khan of Erivan
- Reign: 1747 – 1752
- Successor: Khalil Khan Uzbek
- Born: unknown
- Died: unknown
- Dynasty: Afsharid

Mehdi-Khan Qasemlu (Persian: مهدی خان) was the first khan (governor) of the Erivan Khanate from 1747 to 1752 during the reign of Nader Shah.

== Origin ==
He descended from the Qasemlu branch of the Afsharid clan.

== Biography ==
After the assassination of Nader Shah on the night of July 19-20, 1747, great confusion arose and claims to the throne began to be made from all sides. In this struggle the nephew of Nader Shah Ali-Quli Khan was temporarily brought to power under the name of Adel Shah. However, the new shah could not prevent the emergence of independent feudal khanates.

At that time, the governor of Tabriz Amir-Aslan Khan sent Mir-Mehdi Khan, one of the Afshar generals with his troops to Yerevan to crush the uprising. However, Mehdi Khan himself came to an agreement with the rebels, joined them and began to lead the uprising. Moreover, he together with the Kurd and Afshar tribes joined forces and opposed Amir-Aslan Khan with about 30,000 troops. The united troops attacked the city of Urmia, captured all the treasures of the Khan located there and divided them among themselves. Soon after this event, Ebrahim Shah, who came to power by overthrowing Adel Shah defeated and killed Amir-Aslan Khan.

Mehdi Khan pursued a policy of expanding the territory of his khanate and to this end he again attacked the Urmian Khanate in 1748. The ruler of Urmia Fath-Ali Khan was defeated and was forced to cede certain areas of his khanate to Mehdi Khan.

However, in the summer of 1749, the Erivan khanate itself was attacked by Karabakh khanate. Panah Ali Khan with 4,000 troops crossed the borders of the Erivan Khanate and moved to the lands around Etchmiadzin. For protection from Muslims, the Armenians turned to king Heraclius II of Georgia for help. Heraclius II gathered troops and sent them against the khan of Karabakh. Having suffered a heavy defeat in battle, Panah Ali Khan retreated.

Mehdi Khan decided to punish the Armenians who secretly contacted the Kingdom of Kartli-Kakheti. Then the king Teimuraz II moved to Yerevan in September 1749 with a 25,000-strong army, taking advantage of the call of the Armenians. Unable to resist Mehdi Khan stops making peace with Teimuraz II. On November 22, the Georgian troops left the khanate and returned.

After that, Fath-Ali Shah sent his ally Azad Khan Afghan there at the end of 1751. Mehdi Khan turned to Heraclius II, who then sent him an army consisting of the Kazakh and Borchaly tribes, and thus Mehdi Khan repulsed the attacks of Azad Khan.

Taking advantage of the weakening power of the khan of Erivan, Fath-Ali Shah decided to capture Yerevan. Under the leadership of Azad Khan, in 1751, a 30.000-strong army was sent to Yerevan, besieging the Erivan fortress. The Georgian king moved to the city to protect Yerevan, but his troops were defeated in the battle. Thus, Mehdi Khan was removed from power, and Khalil Khan Uzbek was appointed as a khan of Erivan Khanate in 1752.

== See also ==
- Khalil Khan Uzbek
- Erivan Khanate
- Erivan Governorate

== Sources ==
- Javanshir, Mirza Jamal (1959). Tarikh-e Qarabagh — History of Karabakh. Baku.
- Chingizogly, Anvar (2008). Aydın Avşar, Avşarlar — Afshar tribe. Baku: Şuşa.
- Huseynali, Nazim (2016). Civilization. Baku: Bakı Avrasiya Universitetinin nəşri. p. 231, 228–229.
