= Armenian Oblast =

Province of the Russian Empire from 1828 to 1840

Coordinates: 41°N 44°E

Armenian Oblast Армянская область
- Oblast
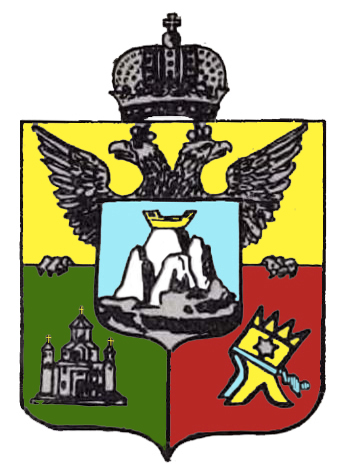
- Coat of arms of the Armenian Oblast

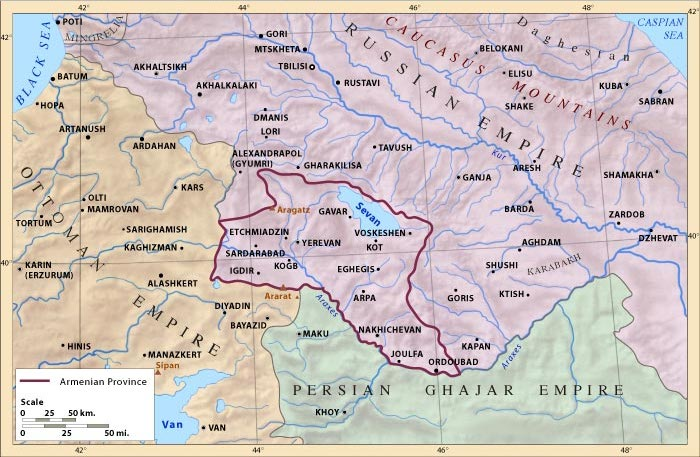
- Map of the Armenian Oblast
- Country: Russian Empire
- Viceroyalty: Caucasus
- Established: 1828
- Abolished: 1840
- Capital: Erivan (Yerevan)

Area
  - Total: 31,672 km^{2} (12,229 sq mi)

Population (1832)
  - Total: 164,500
  - Density: 5.194/km^{2} (13.45/sq mi)

The Armenian Oblast (Note: Russian: Армя́нская о́бласть, romanized: Armyánskaya óblast; Armenian: Հայկական մարզ, romanized: Haykakan marz; Azerbaijani: ارمنی ولایتی, romanized: Ermanī vilāyatī) was a province (oblast) of the Caucasus Viceroyalty of the Russian Empire that existed from 1828 to 1840. It corresponded to most of present-day central Armenia, the Iğdır Province of Turkey, and the Nakhchivan exclave of Azerbaijan. Its administrative center was Yerevan, referred to as Erivan (Эривань) in Russian.

== History ==
The Armenian Oblast was created out of the territories of the former Erivan and Nakhchivan khanates, which were ceded to Russia by Qajar Iran under the Treaty of Turkmenchay after the Russo-Iranian War of 1826-1828. Ivan Paskevich, the Ukrainian-born military leader and hero of the war, was made "Count of Erivan" in the year of the oblast's creation. The creation of the Armenian Oblast was encouraged by Russian officials with pro-Armenian tendencies who wanted to reward Armenians who had supported the Russian cause during the Russo-Iranian Wars. The Russians also believed that Christian Georgians and Armenians "preferred Russian rule" and would back Russian control over the large number of Muslims of the Caucasus.

According to the historian George Bournoutian, the Russians, "for all intents and purposes", refrained from altering "the former Iranian administrative structure". Many of the former Muslims of rank were allowed to continue to fulfill their duties, whereas some were even given Russian military ranks and acted as deputy governors, equivalent to the nayeb rank of the Iranians. As Iran had been forced into "total submission" through the Treaty of Turkmenchay of 1828, the Russians were free of any new possible future conflicts with the Qajars. Therefore, the Armenian Oblast, which bordered Iran, was deliberately ignored by the Russian Caucasus administration (Caucasus Viceroyalty) headquartered in Tiflis (Tbilisi), and even moreso by the central Russian government located in Saint Petersburg.

In 1829, Baltic German explorer Friedrich Parrot of the University of Dorpat (Tartu) traveled to the oblast as part of his expedition to climb Mount Ararat. Accompanied by Armenian writer Khachatur Abovian and four others, Parrot made the first ascent of Ararat in recorded history from the Armenian monastery of St. Hakob in Akhuri (modern Yenidoğan).

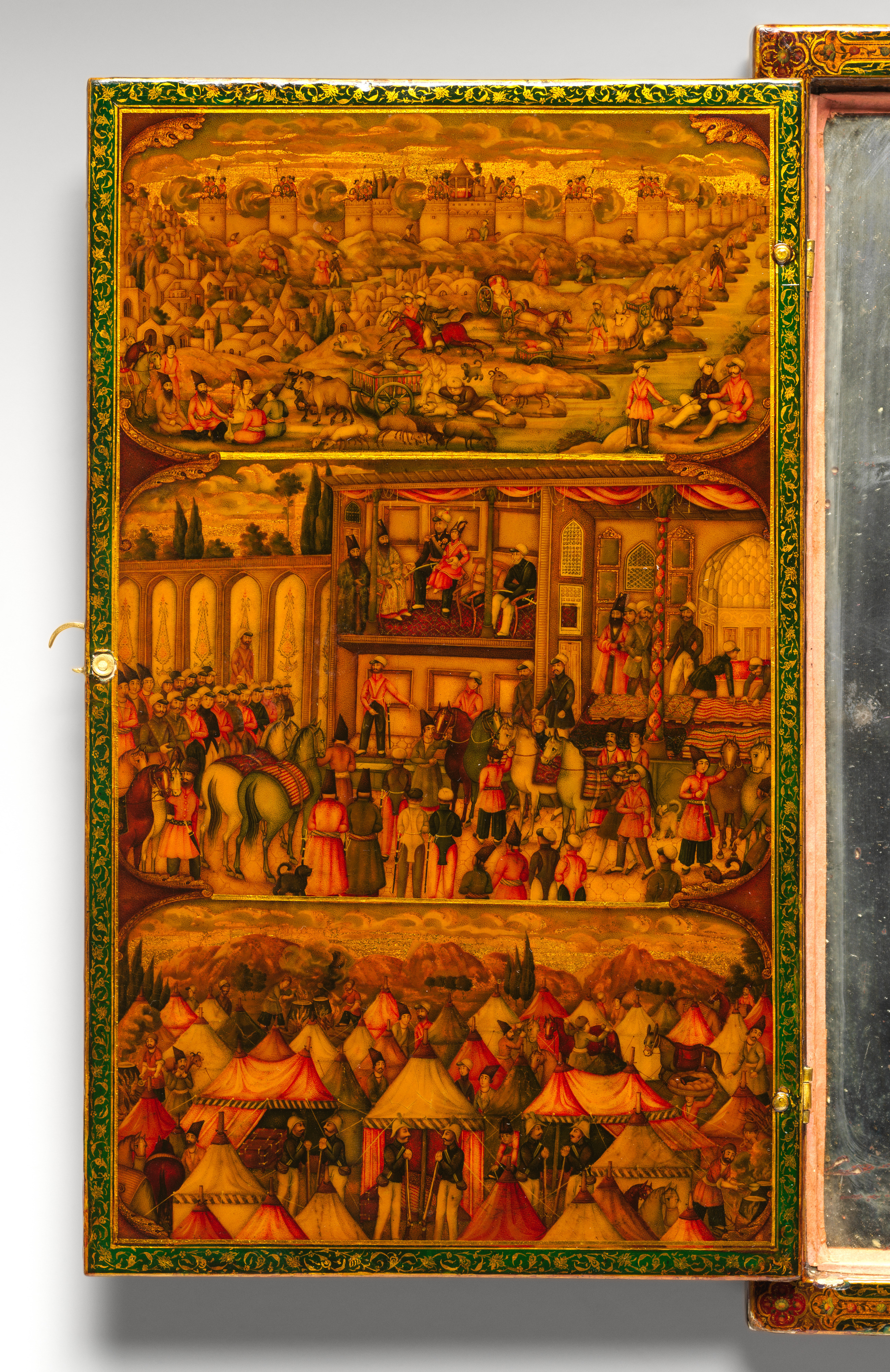
Interior panel of a mirror case commemorating the 1838 meeting of Iranian crown prince Naser al-Din Mirza (later, Shah) and Tsar Nicholas I of Russia in Erivan in the Armenian Oblast. The scene at the center shows the seven-year-old prince sitting on the tsar's lap, accompanied by an entourage. Created by Mohammad Esmail Esfahani in Tehran, dated 1854

In 1840, due to complaints from Armenians (Note: Those who had migrated from Iran were especially unhappy and claimed that they had enjoyed better treatment in Iran.) and the small pack of Russian officials about the high-handed measures of the province's Muslim administrators, the Russian government issued a decree which forced "all local laws and customs to be set aside, that all business be conducted in Russian and that Russians staff all administrative offices". Simultaneously, the Russians ended the separate status of the Armenian Oblast, and merged it into the newly established Georgian-Imeretian Province.

The new division did not last long. Already in 1844, four years later, in order to further consolidate the Russian hold over the North Caucasus and South Caucasus, the Caucasus Viceroyalty was re-established, in which the former Armenian Oblast formed a subdivision of the Tiflis Governorate. Five years later, in 1849, the Erivan Governorate was established, separate from the Tiflis Governorate. It included the territory of the former Erivan and Nakhchivan khanates.

== Demographics ==
=== Background ===
Immediately after the Russian-Iranian War of 1826-1828, the Russians "combined the former Iranian khanates of Yerevan and Nakhichevan into the newly formed Armenian Province". As per the Russian surveys which were conducted by Ivan Chopin from 1829 to 1832, the Muslim (Tatar, (Note: The term "Tatars", employed by the Russians, referred to Turkish-speaking Muslims (Shia and Sunni) of Transcaucasia. Unlike the Armenians and Georgians, the Tatars did not have their own alphabet and used the Perso-Arabic script. After 1918 with the establishment of the Azerbaijan Democratic Republic, and "especially during the Soviet era", the Tatar group identified itself as "Azerbaijani". Prior to 1918 the word "Azerbaijan" exclusively referred to the Iranian province of Azarbayjan.) Kurdish and Iranian) population of the Erivan Khanate in the last year of Iranian rule had amounted to 49,875 (71,5%) of the total population of the khanate. The Armenian natives of the Erivan Khanate numbered 20,073 (28,5%) in the same year. The Muslim population of the Nakhichevan Khanate had been 24,385 (83%), whereas Armenians numbered 5,078 (17%). According to the 1829-1832 Russian surveys, on the eve of the Russian conquest, the total number of inhabitants of what was bound to become the Russian-administered Armenian Oblast (i.e., the combined number of people of the Erivan and Nakhichevan khanates), amounted to 99,411, of which 74,260 (75%) were Muslims and 25,151 were Armenians (25%). Bournoutian estimates that if the ruling Qajar hierarchy and the nomads (Note: Most nomads returned after Iran ceded the territory to Russia.) who left after the war are added, the total population was somewhat over 100,000. Ethnic Armenians were a majority in only 3 (Kırk-Bulagh, Sardarabad and Karbi-Basar) of the 15 mahals of the Erivan Khanate, and just in 1 (Agulis/Akulis) of the 10 mahals of the Nakhichevan Khanate.

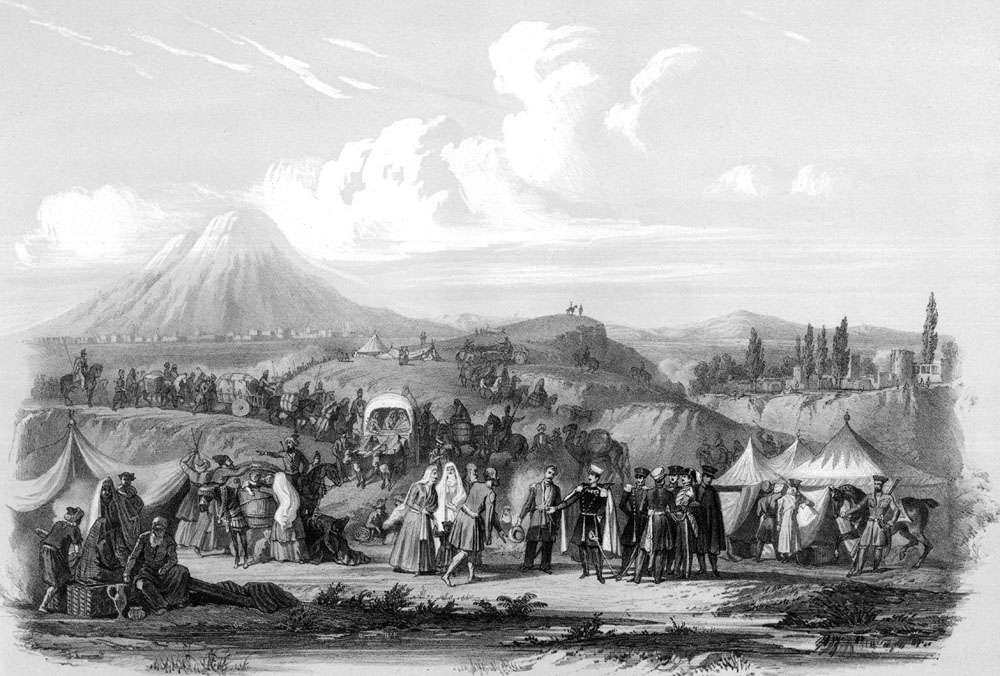
Resettlement of Armenians to Russia after the signing of the Treaty of Turkmenchay. Drawn by Vladimir Moshkov

Since the start of the 18th century, a "handful" of Armenian notables in Russia, Georgia and Karabakh had been trying to gather Russian support in order to free their compatriots from Muslim rule and to place them under Russian protection. Armenian volunteers from Georgia and Karabakh had also joined the Russian forces during the Russo-Iranian wars. During the peace negotiations between the Russians and Iranians, article XV was added to the Treaty of Turkmenchay by the Russians in order to facilitate the creation of a reliable "Christian defensive line" on the existing Russo-Ottoman border in the Caucasus. Another reason for the inclusion of the article was to comply with the yearnings of Armenians and those within the Russian ranks who supported them. According to article XV, any Iranian subject who inhabited the Azerbaijan Province was allowed to freely migrate into the Russian Empire, and was given one year to transport themselves and their families. They were also given the freedom to transport or sell their property, as Bournoutian explains, "without the government or local authorities having the right to place the least obstacle in their way or to impose any tax or add any duties on the goods and objects sold or exported by them". In relation to the immovable property of the migrants, a term of five years was given during which they could sell or dispose their immovable property "as they wished". The newly positioned Russian administrators in Russian Armenia were also directed to supply logistical and financial support to the migrants.

Although not mentioned specifically by name, Bournoutian notes that article XV of the Turkmenchay Treaty was intended solely for the repatriation of those Armenians whose ancestors had been forcibly relocated to Iran proper in the early 17th century during the Safavid period. Bournoutian adds that the Russians spread announcements in Armenian in Armenian villages, and Russian soldiers, some of which were of Armenian origin, together with Cossacks "strongly persuaded" any hesitant Armenian to leave Iran.

=== Demographics ===
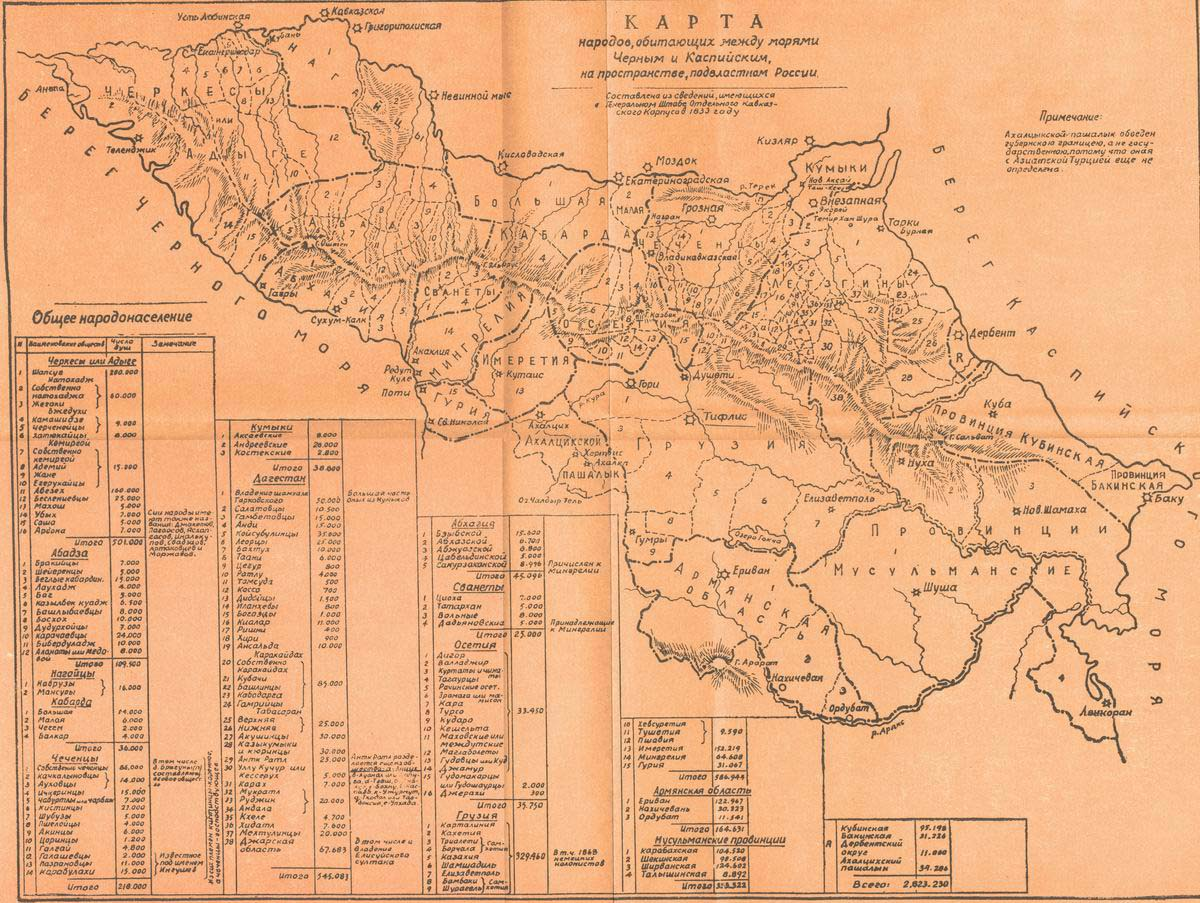
1833 map of the Russian Caucasus

From 1828—the year in which the Treaty of Turkmenchay was signed—to 1831, 35,560 Armenians migrated from Qajar Iran's Azerbaijan Province and moved into the Armenian Oblast, soon to be rebranded as Russian Armenia in order to distinguish it from "Turkish Armenia". By 1831, two years after the Russian victory in the Russo-Turkish War (1828–29), another 21,666 Armenians from the Ottoman-ruled pashaliks of Bayazid and Kars had moved into the Armenian Oblast (Russian Armenia). Another source writes that 40,000 Armenians migrated from Iran, and 90,000 from the Ottoman Empire, settling mainly in the Armenian Oblast. Bournoutian notes that by 1832, according to the Russian surveys, there were 82,377 Armenians in the Armenian Oblast. The 7,813 Tatar and Kurdish nomads who had left the territory during the Russo-Iranian War of 1826-1828, had also returned to their pasturelands by 1832, thereby increasing the total Muslim population of the Armenian Oblast to 82,073. Bournoutian concludes that therefore, the total population of the Armenian Oblast in 1832 was 164,450, with Armenians forming 50.09% and Muslims 49.91%. Two centuries after their forced relocation by Safavid Shah Abbas the Great (r. 1588-1629), Armenians "had only achieved parity with the Muslims in part of their historical homeland".

Some Armenians, complaining about their life under Russian rule, later decided to leave their homeland and returned to Iran, where they were welcomed in Tabriz by crown prince Abbas Mirza and his successors.

The vast majority of the Muslims of the Armenian Oblast were Shia. The term "Tatars", employed by the Russians, referred to Turkish-speaking Muslims (Shia and Sunni) of Transcaucasia. Unlike Armenians and Georgians, the Tatars did not have their own alphabet and used the Perso-Arabic script. After 1918 with the establishment of the Azerbaijan Democratic Republic, and "especially during the Soviet era", the Tatar group identified itself as "Azerbaijani". Prior to 1918 the word "Azerbaijan" exclusively referred to the Iranian province of Azarbayjan.

== Administration ==
There were only a small number of Russian officials in the Armenian Oblast and they were dependent on the former Muslim administrators and interpreters who had served under the Iranians. Bournoutian notes that "Land tenure, taxes and the judicial system remained virtually unchanged, and Persian or the local Turkish dialect continued to be used in many administrative offices".

== Literature ==
- A Journey to Arzrum, Alexander Pushkin, 1835–36
- Wounds of Armenia, Khachatur Abovian, 1841

== See also ==
- Russian Armenia
- Erivan Governorate
- History of the administrative division of Russia
