= Ivan Chopin =

Russian historian (1798–1870)

Ivan Chopin (Russian: Иван Иванович Шопен; 1798 – 15 August 1870) was a Russian historian, ethnographer and statesman of French origin. He was not related to the more famous composer Frédéric Chopin.

== History ==
Chopin was born in 1798 in France and lived there until 1825. The circumstances of his birth and upbringing are unknown. In the mid-1820s, he came to Russia, where he took the name of Ivan Ivanovich, and remained for a long time in the Caucasian civil service. In 1829, he was instructed by the Governor of the Caucasus Paskevich to make the description of the newly conquered territories of Eastern Armenia. From 1829 till 1832 Chopin was engaged in a detailed study of the Erivan and Nakhichevan Khanate, which by Treaty of Turkmenchay in 1828 were given to the Russian Empire and were named as the Armenian Oblast.

Collecting material for future books, Chopin met with people of different ethnic origin, and observed their customs and culture. In 1830, Chopin was appointed as advisor of the Armenian regional government. In 1833, he was chairman of the Department of Revenue and the state-owned property of the Armenian Oblast, and after he became an official for special assignments Chief Commander of the Transcaucasian region.

== Literature ==
- Миансаров М. — «Bibliographia Caucasica et Transcaucasica». Т. I. — 1874—1875.
- Арешян С. Г. Армянская печать и царская цензура. — Ереван, 1957. — С. 98—102.
