= Maziar Behrooz =

Iranian-American historian (born 1959)

- Born: 1959 (age 66–67)

Academic background
- Education: University of California, Los Angeles (PhD)
- Thesis: The Iranian Communist Movement 1953-1983: Why Did the Left Fail? (1993)
- Doctoral advisor: Michael G. Morony, Hossein Ziai, Nikki Keddie

Maziar Behrooz (Persian: مازیار بهروز; born 1959) is an Iranian-born American historian of modern Iran and professor of history at San Francisco State University.

== Biography ==
Maziar Behrooz was born in 1959, in Tehran, to Sara Khosrovi-Azarbaijani and Jahangir (Changiz) Behrouz. He received his high school diploma from the United Kingdom.

Behrooz received his B.A degree in History-Political Science from Saint Mary's College of California (1982), his M.A. degree in Modern History of Europe from San Francisco State University (1986), and his PH.D. in Modern History of the Near East from University of California, Los Angeles (1993).

He has taught at a number of universities and colleges including the University of California, Berkeley; Saint Mary's College of California; Stanford University; Bridgewater State College; and is currently professor at the History Department of San Francisco State University where he teaches various courses concerning the modern history of the Middle East.

He has authored numerous articles and book chapters on Iran and is the author of two books on the history of the left movement in Iran. His first book is Rebels with a Cause: The Failure of the Left in Iran (I.B. Tauris and Co., 1994), which was based on his doctoral research. According to WorldCat, the book is held in 249 libraries and has been translated into Persian (2001) and Turkish (2006). One of his recent research project is about late-18th century to early 19th-century encounters between Iran and the Western world.

In 2023, San Francisco State University launched an investigation after a student complained that Behrooz had shown a depiction of Muhammad while teaching a class on the history of the Islamic world; the investigation was strongly criticized by the Foundation for Individual Rights and Expression as an "unacceptable — and unconstitutional" violation of academic freedom.

== Publications ==
- Behrooz, Maziar (1999). Rebels with a Cause: The Failure of the Left. London, UK: I.B. Tauris. ISBN 9780755612093.
- Behrooz, Maziar (2023). Iran at War: Iran's Struggle with Imperial Russia. London, UK: I.B. Tauris. ISBN 9781780766270.
