= Hajji Beg, Khan of Ganja =

Khan of Ganja from 1783 to 1786

Hajji Beg

Khan of Ganja
- Reign: 1783 - 1786
- Predecessor: Title last held by Muhammad II
- Successor: Rahim Khan
- Died: 1786 (?)
- Noble family: Ziyadoghlu Qajar

Hajji Beg was fourth Khan of Ganja from 1784 to 1786. A member of Ziyadoghlu Qajar family Hajji Beg led a rebellion against the Georgian troops occupying Ganja in 1783 with support from Ibrahim Khalil of Karabakh and ruled the khanate from late 1783 to 1786. After successful rebellion, he invited Ali bek, the leader of Dzhengutay Kumyks to protect Ganja, whom were under attack from Heraclius II who did not want to come to terms with the loss of Ganja. Already in the autumn of 1784, with the help of Russian troops led by colonel Stepan Burnashev (1743-1824), he undertook a campaign against Ganja.

However, his rule soon came to an end when, according to Butkov, the brother of the late khan, Rahim bey, allegedly managed to escape from prison in the same year and reassert himself on the Ganja throne supported by Muhammad Hasan of Shaki.

Preceded by Muhammad II	Khan of Ganja; 1783–1786	Succeeded by Rahim Khan
