= Panah Ali Khan =

Turkic noble (1693–1763)

Khan of Karabakh
- In office 1748–1760
- Succeeded by: Mehrali Bey Javanshir

Personal details
- Born: 1693 Karabakh, Safavid Iran
- Died: 1763 (aged 69–70) or 1759 (aged 65–66) Shiraz, Zand Iran
- Children: Ibrahim Khalil Khan; Mehrali bey Javanshir and others
- Parent: Ibrahim Agha Javanshir (father)
- Tribe: Javanshir clan, Sarijali branch

Panah Ali Khan Javanshir (Persian: پناه‌علی‌ خان جوانشیر; Azerbaijani: پناهعلی خان; 1693 – 1759 or 1763) was the founder and first ruler of the Karabakh Khanate under Persian suzerainty.

== Ancestry ==
Panah Ali Khan was from the Sarijali branch of the Javanshir clan, who with their associate clan of Otuz-Iki (meaning 'thirty-two' in Turkic) had long been rivals of the Yirmi-Dört (meaning 'twenty-four' in Turkic) and Ziyadoghlu Qajars of Ganja, whose chiefs had been official rulers of Karabakh since Safavid times. His father's name was Ibrahim Agha Javanshir, but information on his further ancestry is quite complicated.

According to Mirza Adigozal Bey, Panah Ali's paternal great-grandfather and namesake Panah Ali Bey served at the headquarters of the governors (beglarbegs) of the Karabakh-Ganja province in the early 17th century, at the time when the region was directly controlled by the Safavid Empire of Iran. He soon retired, married a woman from the Javanshir clan of Karabakh and had a son by the name of Ali (nicknamed Sarija Ali). They lived in their estate located in Arasbar (Arasbaran) but also owned land in Tartar and the northern shores of the Aras River. The Arasbar estate was rebuilt into a castle during Sarija Ali's son Ibrahim Khalil's lifetime and has been known as Ibrahim Khalil Galasi (fort) since.

However, the aforementioned information is contradicted by different sources, namely Mir Mehdi Khazani, who names Panah Ali Khan's grandfather as Ibrahim Sultan (head of the tribe c. 1672) and great-grandfather as Budagh Sultan (head of the tribe c. 1628). Azerbaijani historian E. B. Shukurzade proposes Panah Ali Agha (I) as his grandfather and Ibrahim Khalil Agha (I) as his great-grandfather. However, in all versions his father is the same. Panah Ali had two brothers, elder Fazl Ali Bey, and younger Behbud Ali Bey.

== Early life ==
After the dethronement of the Safavids in 1736 by Nader Shah, the landed classes of Ganja and Karabakh (including the Javanshirs) gathered in Mughan and decided to oppose the new shah and agreed to try to restore the Safavids to the throne. When this news reached Nader Shah, he ordered all Muslim landowners of the region and their families deported to Khorasan (northeastern Iran) as punishment. Panah Ali was among the deportees. Nader Shah kept Panah Ali with him as a hostage and made Panah's brother Fazl Ali his na'ib ('deputy' or 'lieutenant') and ishik aghasi ('chief courtier' or 'chamberlain'). When Fazl Ali was killed (in battle, according to Mirza Yusuf Nersesov), Panah succeeded him in his position. (Note: Armenian tradition holds that Panah Ali served as Nader's herald (jarchi) and was known as Jarchi Panah. This is also mentioned by the Indo-Armenian traveler Joseph Emin, who visited Karabakh in the 18th century and heard it from the wife of one of the Armenian meliks.) Following the execution of his brother Behbud Ali Bey c. 1744, Panah Ali Khan escaped and hid from Nader Shah. (Note: Mirza Jamal Javanshir writes that envious people in Nader's court slandered Panah Ali to the shah, causing Panah Ali to flee for his life; he gives the date for Panah Ali's flight as 1737/38. According to Ahmad Bey Javanshir, Nader became angry at Panah Ali for an unspecified reason, and Panah Ali fled out of fear, remembering his brother Behbud Ali Bey, who was executed because he had looked at the shah the wrong way.) He is said to have found refuge in the mountains of Karabakh and with the sultan (district governor) of Qabala or, according to another source, with the "Lezgins" of Jar-Balakan, from where he carried out raids and became a popular leader. An Armenian tradition claims that Melik Allahghuli of Jraberd hired Panah Ali as his tax collector (darugha) and protected him from Nader Shah. According to Mirza Adigozal Bey, Nader Shah sent letters to the local khans ordering them to apprehend Panah Ali, but no one was able to do this. Meanwhile, Panah Ali's power continually grew. In June 1747, Nader Shah was assassinated, after which Panah Ali went to Karabakh and declared himself khan. He began to raid nearby regions including Ganja and Nakhchivan. Many of the tribes that had previously been deported from Karabakh returned and joined Panah Ali, as did his son Ibrahim Khalil. (Note: Mirza Jamal and Ahmad Bey suggest that Ibrahim Khalil returned prior to the death of Nader Shah.) He established his dominance over the Otuz-Iki and Kebirlu tribes, marrying the sister of the chief of the Kebirlu. In 1748, the new ruler of Persia, Adel Shah, issued a firman (decree) recognizing Panah Ali as the Khan of Karabakh.

== Reign ==
Adil Shah's murder in 1748 left Panah Ali virtually independent. He campaigned against the Five Melikdoms of Karabakh as part of his plan to solidify his rule in Karabakh. He forged an alliance with new Melik of Varanda, Melik Shahnazar II, who had recently killed his uncle or elder brother Hovsep and usurped rule. Melik Shahnazar II's daughter Hurizad was wed to Panah Ali's son Ibrahim Khalil and the melik swore fealty to the khan. The other meliks forged an alliance and raided Shahnazar's lands but couldn't take his fortress in Avetaranots.

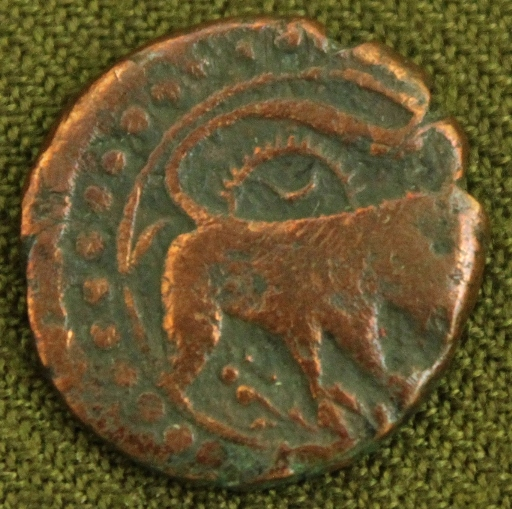
Coin minted in Panah Ali's reign in Shusha

Taking advantage of the power vacuum in the region, Panah Ali campaigned to the west and south against the khanates of Nakhchivan and Karadagh, taking Tatev and Sisian from the former and Bargushat, Meghri and Göynük from the latter. He also conquered Ghapan and Zangezur from Ebrahim Afshar. To the north, he subdued the Kolani tribe living on the shores of the Tartar River. He also invited a part of the Kangarlu tribe from Nakhchivan as well as the Damirchi Hasanlu and Jinli tribes from Georgia to settle in his territory. This was also when Bayat Fortress was built as the khan's first residence. In a short period, external walls were constructed, ditches were dug out, and a bazaar, bath and mosque were built. Craftsmen from surrounding areas were resettled in the castle. Many residents of the area, especially craftsmen of the Tabriz district and Ardabil, moved to Bayat Fortress with their families. Panah Ali Khan's growing power faced resistance from the Khanate of Ganja, the Khanate of Shaki and from the remaining Melikdoms of Karabakh, as well as rival branches of the Javanshir clan. The struggle between the khan of Karabakh and Haji Chalabi Khan of Shaki, one of the most powerful rulers of the South Caucasus, started the same year. Haji Chalabi Khan, wishing to stop the growth of Panah Ali Khan's power, allied with Hajji Muhammad Ali Khan of Shirvan and surrounded the castle of Bayat. The allies unsuccessfully tried to capture the capital of the Karabakh Khanate for a month. The khans of Shaki and Shirvan withdrew, incurring huge casualties and failing to accomplish their mission. Hajji Chelebi Khan said: "Until now Panah Khan was raw silver that was not minted. We came, minted it, and returned." Another 19th-century Karabakh historian, Mirza Yusuf, renders the same line as: "Until now Panah Khan was merely gold, we came and minted a coin from that gold."

Panah Ali was forced to abandon Bayat and constructed Shahbulag Castle instead. Using the power vacuum in Persia, he acted to subdue neighboring regions as well. He moved on Nazarali Khan Shahsevan of Ardabil in 1749 and forced him to marry his sister Shahnisa to his own son Ibrahim Khalil and accept vassalage. The same year he attacked Shahverdi Khan of Ganja and subdued him, forcing Shahverdi's daughter Tuti to marry Ibrahim Khalil as well. According to Mirza Adigozal Bey, he also kept his sons as hostage in Shahbulag. However, emergence of new Qajar warlord Muhammad Hasan Khan forced Panah Ali to seek a new fortress. On the advice of Melik Shahnazar II, he built Shusha Castle in 1750-1751 and relocated his capital, thus settling a semi-nomadic populace in the quarters of the new city.

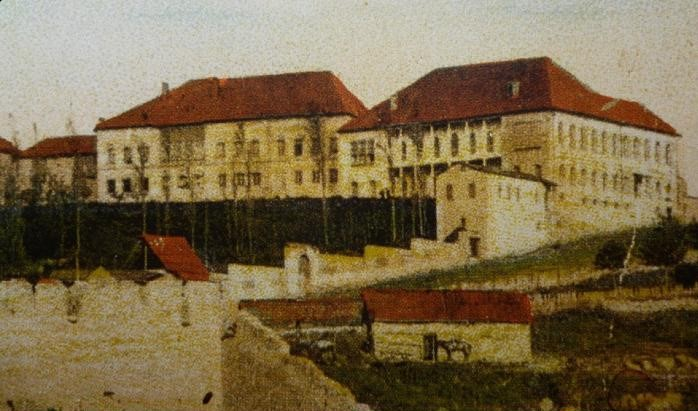
Palace of Karabakh Khans in 19th century

=== Campaign against Shaki ===
Next year, in 1752, Teimuraz II of Kakheti attacked Ganja and forced Panah Ali to retreat from area. Teymuraz then allied himself to Haji Chalabi of Shaki to raid Djaro-Belokani, only to be betrayed by the latter, who defeated the Georgian army. Using this opportunity, Panah Ali allied himself with Shahverdi Khan of Ganja, Kazim Khan of Karadagh, Hasan Ali Khan of Erivan, Heydarqoli Khan of Nakhchivan against Haji Chalabi of Shaki the same year and invited Heraclius II of Georgia to their alliance. During the negotiations near Qızılqaya, the Georgian detachments, hiding in ambush, surrounded and captured five khans along with their retinue. Haji Chalabi, having learned about the conspiracy of Heraclius II, gathered an army and began to pursue Heraclius, attacked him and defeated him in the battle at the river Aghstafa, having freed all the captured khans. Haji Chalabi later invaded the Georgian possessions, where he captured the Kazakh and Borchali regions, leaving his son Agakishi bey as viceroy.

=== Campaign against the Melikdoms ===
After returning to Karabakh, Panah Khan began his campaign against the remaining Armenian principalities of Karabakh. He allied with the tanuter (headman) of Khndzristan village Mirzakhan and promised him the Principality of Khachen if he would kill Melik Allahverdi I Hasan-Jalalyan. Having achieved this, Mirzakhan was made the new Melik of Khachen by Panah Ali in 1755. Soon after the Melik of Jraberd, Allahqoli Soltan, was also arrested and beheaded in Shusha. Panah Ali later signed a separate peace with Yesayi, Melik of Dizak.

In 1757, Mohammad Hasan Khan Qajar arrived in Karabakh to gather troops to fight against Karim Khan Zand. Panah Ali refused to join his armies and battled against the Qajar troops. Mohammad Hasan Khan soon left for Iran and left his cannons in the area, which were later taken by Panah Ali. However, he soon faced another invasion from south, this time by Fath-Ali Khan Afshar, Khan of Urmia, in 1759. The Armenian meliks of Talish and Jraberd, Melik Hovsep and Melik Hatham (brother of Allahqoli), respectively, joined Fath-Ali in his siege of Shusha. Unable to withstand the assault, Panah Ali submitted to Fath Ali, handing over his son Ibrahim Khalil as a hostage. However, Panah Ali had to switch his allegiance to the Zands, who captured Ibrahim Khalil from Fath Ali after a battle in 1760. He left his son Mehr Ali Beg Javanshir in charge of the khanate while he left for battle against Fath-Ali.

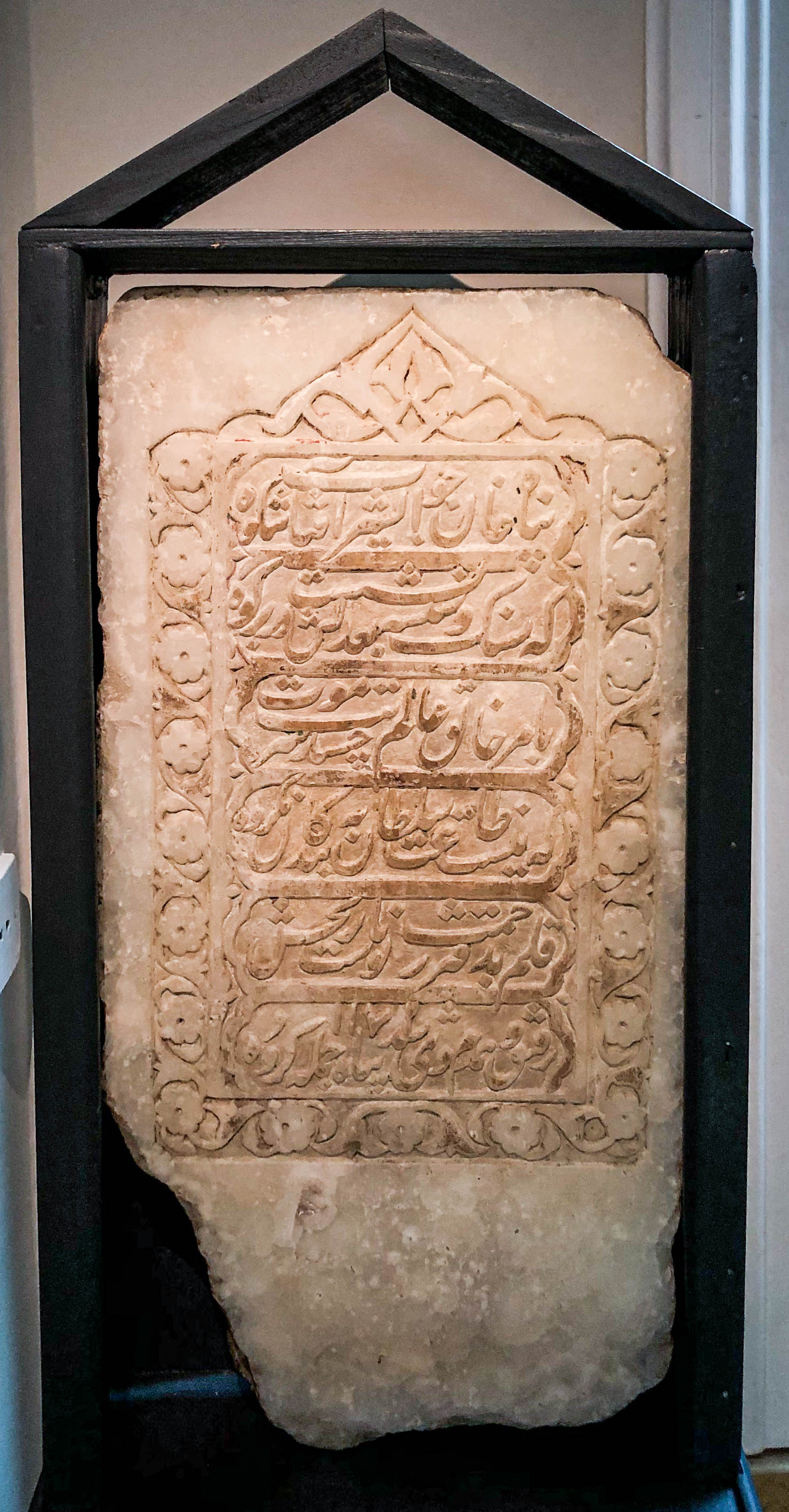
Gravestone of Panah Ali Khan

== Death ==
According to Mirza Adigozal Bey, when Karim Khan Zand took control of much of Iran, he forced Panah Khan to come to his capital, Shiraz, where he died as a hostage in 1763 (although, according to his gravestone in Aghdam, he died in July–August 1759). However Raffi and Mirza Yusuf Qarabaghi offer another version of Panah Ali's death, where he faked his death in order to escape Shiraz but was captured, killed and his stomach was stuffed. Panah Ali Khan's son Ibrahim Khalil Khan was sent back to Karabakh as governor. Ibrahim, succeeding his father, not only ruled over most of Karabakh, but also became one of the major potentates in the Caucasus.

== Family ==
Panah Ali was married to a sister of Hajji Sahliyali Bey of the Kebirlu clan, among other wives, and had several sons:

- Ibrahim Khalil Khan
- Mehrali Bey Javanshir
- Talibkhan Bey
- Kelbali Bey
- Aghasi Bey
- Alimadat Bey
- Nasir Bey
- Alipasha Bey

== See also ==
- Javanshir Qizilbash
- Qizilbash
