= Rahim Khan of Ganja =

Khan of Ganja from 1785 to 1786

Hajji Beg

Khan of Ganja
- Reign: 1785 - 1786
- Predecessor: Hajji Beg
- Successor: Javad Khan
- Died: 1786 (?)
- Noble family: Ziyadoghlu Qajar
- Father: Shahverdi Khan

Rahim Khan was the fifth Khan of Ganja, who ruled only briefly in 1786.

== Life ==
He was the youngest son of Shahverdi Khan of Ganja. He was forced to take refuge in Georgia when his half-brother Muhammad Khan of Ganja usurped the throne in 1778. He succeeded Hajji Beg in 1785 with help from Heraclius II. However, after death of Ahmad Khan Donboli in 1786, Ibrahim Khalil of Karabakh's major ally, later moved on to strengthen himself at the expense of Ganja. In the early spring of 1786, at the insistence of Ibrahim Khan, his brother-in-law the Avar Umma Khan, attacked Ganja and "having taken 5,000 rubles of indemnity from this city," failing to completely capture Ganja, retreated to Shusha, leaving, however, part of the troops near the river Kura. Later in May, Ibrahim Khalil himself arrived in vicinity of the city. On June 25, Ibrahim while keeping the city under siege, sent his envoy Hazrat Qoli bey (former governor of Ganja for Karabakh) to Tiflis to Heraclius and offered him to send Prince Kaikhosro Andronikashvili (also former governor of Ganja for Georgia) with the army, "to rule as before". Heraclius was forced to agree, although it was not in his interests to share power in Ganja with Ibrahim Khan. However, the tense situation in the border regions with Akhaltsikhe required the constant presence of the tsarist troops there. Heraclius in return sent Hazrat Qoli to Rahim, suggesting him to surrender to Ibrahim Khalil.

Thus, Rahim ruled for a year and was deposed by the Georgia officially but Karabakh Khanate was the main instigator.

== Family ==
He was married to Bajikhanum, a commoner and had a son named Imam Qoli Khan. Imam Qoli had 4 sons and a daughter.

== Sources ==
- Babayev, Elgun (2003). Из истории Гянджинского ханства [From the history of the Ganja Khanate] (PDF) (in Russian). Baku: Nurlan.

Preceded by Hajji Beg	Khan of Ganja; 1785 - 1786	Succeeded by Javad Khan
