= Muhammad Hasan, Khan of Ganja =

Muhammad Hasan Khan

Khan of Ganja
- Reign: 1768 - 1778
- Predecessor: Shahverdi Khan of Ganja
- Successor: Muhammad Khan
- Born: 1742
- Died: 1778 (aged 35–36)
- Noble family: Ziyadoghlu Qajar
- Father: Shahverdi Khan of Ganja
- Mother: Gulgoncha

Muhammad Hasan Khan (1742–1778) was the second Khan of Ganja from 1768 to 1780 from the Ziyadoglu branch of the Qajar clan who ruled the Beylerbeylik of Karabakh as hereditary governors.

== Background ==
He was born in 1742 to Shahverdi Khan and his Armenian wife Gulgoncha in Ganja.

== Reign ==
He came to power in 1768 or 1761 after the murder of his father, Shahverdi Khan, with the Georgian help. He paid great attention to the economic development of the Ganja Khanate, especially to the development of sericulture. Khan invited many silkworm breeders from Georgia to permanent residence in Ganja, causing a negative reaction from Heraclius II, who instructed his wife, Queen Darejan, to take measures to prevent this resettlement. Queen, who at that time was actually involved in all government affairs, ordered the treasurer of the court, Joseph, to return the settlers in any way possible.

According to Bakikhanov, in 1769, Utsmi of Qaytaq, Emir Hamza with 3000 selected cavalry passed through Derbend, Quba and Shirvan and attacked Ardabil. Having devastated this region, he attacked Ganja through Karabakh and ruined its surroundings more than the Ardabil district. After that, through Shaki, Akhty, and the Kura, he returned Muhammad Hasan Khan had to seek help from the ruler of Kartli-Kakheti. According to Nikita Panin's report in 1770, he was still paying 10.000 tomans to Georgia as tribute.

== Death ==
In 1778, during the palace strife, his brother Muhammad Khan overthrew him and took power in Ganja into his own hands. Some sources report his death date as 1792. He had a son named Ali agha.

== Sources ==
- Babayev, Elgun (2003). Из истории Гянджинского ханства [From the history of the Ganja Khanate] (PDF) (in Russian). Baku: Nurlan.

Preceded by Shah Verdi Khan	Khan of Ganja; 1768–1778	Succeeded by Muhammad Khan
