= Dositheus of Tbilisi =

Dositheus (Dositeoz Tbileli; Georgian: დოსითეოზ თბილელი, died 12 September 1795) was a hierarch of the Georgian Orthodox Church and Archbishop of Tbilisi canonized as a martyr for his death at the hands of the Iranian soldiers in 1795.

Dositheus was a priest confessor of Queen Darejan Dadiani, consort of King Heraclius II of Georgia, and metropolitan bishop of Tbilisi. When the city of Tbilisi fell to the invading army of Agha Muhammad Khan Qajar, ruler of Iran, in the aftermath of the Battle of Krtsanisi in September 1795, a group of Qajar soldiers found the elderly Dositheus at the Sioni Cathedral kneeling before the icon of Virgin Mary and threw him to his death into the Kura River. Dositheus was subsequently canonized as a hieromartyr, his feast day marked on 12 September, the day of his death.
