= Muhammad Khan of Ganja =

Khan of Ganja from 1778 to 1780

Muhammad Khan

Khan of Ganja
- Reign: 1778 - 1780
- Predecessor: Muhammad Hasan Khan
- Successor: Title next held by Hajji Khan
- Born: 1738
- Died: 1780 (aged 41–42) or 1785 (aged 46–47)
- Noble family: Ziyadoghlu Qajar
- Father: Shahverdi Khan of Ganja
- Mother: Gulgoncha

Muhammad Khan, Mammad Khan or Muhammad II of Ganja (1738–1780) was the third Khan of Ganja from 1768 to 1780 from the Ziyadoglu branch of the Qajar clan who ruled the Beylerbeylik of Karabakh as hereditary governors.

== Life ==
He was born in 1738 to Shahverdi Khan and his wife Sharafjahan in Ganja. He deposed his elder brother Muhammad Hasan in 1778 and usurped the throne. Once came to power he eliminated all his relatives who could somehow interfere with him in state affairs. His younger brothers were forced to take refuge outside the khanate - Javad beg submitted to Ibrahim Khalil Khan of Karabakh, and Rahim beg went to Heraclius II. Mammad Khan then ordered his uncle Reza Qoli Khan, who recently arrived from Iran in 1779, to be blinded.

== Deposition ==
Taking advantage of the situation in Ganja, Heraclius and Ibrahim Khalil made a pact and attacked Ganja on behalf of their puppet princes. Thus, at the beginning of 1780, the allied troops surrounded the Ganja fortress. The garrison of the fortress, led by Mammad Khan, could not resist for a long time and surrendered to the allied forces. Mammad Khan himself, with his entire family, was taken prisoner and then blinded by Ibrahim Khalil. Having conquered Ganja, the victors appointed their representatives to manage the khanate. Hazrat Qoli beg (himself an ethnic Georgian) was the Karabakh governor while Prince Kaikhosro Andronikashvili, mdivanbegi ("High Court judge") of Georgia was appointed as Heraclius' governor. Prince Andronikashvili had up to 3000 soldiers at his disposal. However, this dual power, formed in Ganja, did not last long. Already by 1783, the situation had changed after Heraclius' treaty with Russia. Ibrahim Khalil soon funded an uprising in 1783 led by Hajji Khan against Georgian troops. However, it ended up that the raging people expelled both foreign rulers from the city at the end of 1783.

According to some sources, he was executed by Ibrahim Kalil in 1785 in Shusha.

== Family ==
He was married to a sister of Surkhai Khan (1680–1748) of Qazikumukh - Huri Bike. His first daughter Bilqayis was married to her cousin Shukur agha Javanshir, son of Mammad Hasan agha Javanshir, second daughter Sharafjahan begüm was also married to her cousin, Ughurlu Khan, son of Javad Khan.

== Sources ==
- Babayev, Elgun (2003). Из истории Гянджинского ханства [From the history of the Ganja Khanate] (PDF) (in Russian). Baku: Nurlan.

Preceded by Muhammad Hasan Khan	Khan of Ganja; 1778–1780	Succeeded by Georgian–Karabakh condominium
