= Battle of Krtsanisi =

1795 battle between Qajar Iran and Georgia

- Part of Iranian invasions of Georgia
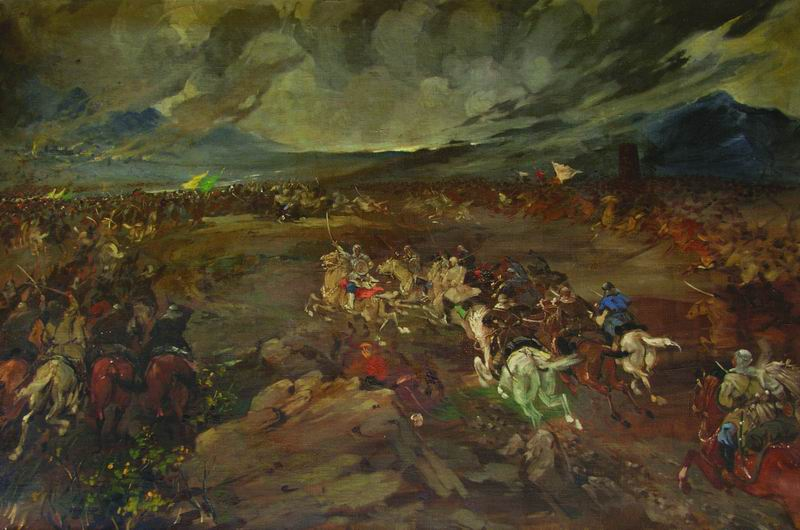
- Battle of Krtsanisi by Valerian Sidamon-Eristavi
Date	September 8–11, 1795
Location	Krtsanisi, Tbilisi 41°36′35″N 44°54′10″E
Result	Iranian victory
Territorial changes	Tbilisi conquered and sacked, eastern Georgia briefly reoccupied by Iran (Note: "(..) Aga Mohammad Khan then proceeded to punish Erekle and capture Tbilisi, which resulted in the bloody conquest of eastern Georgia.") (Note: "Agha Muhammad Khan remained nine days in the vicinity of Tiflis. His victory proclaimed the restoration of Iranian military power in the region formerly under Safavid domination.") (Note: "The Qajars eventually won the struggle, and under Agha Mohammad Khan set about re-establishing Persia's traditional boundaries. Agha Mohammad Khan reconquered Georgia in September 1795.")

Belligerents
Kingdom of Kartli-Kakheti; Kingdom of Imereti	Qajar Iran; Ganja Khanate; Erivan Khanate

Commanders and leaders
Heraclius II; Solomon II; Prince Ioane; Prince Vakhtang	Agha Mohammad Shah

Strength
2,000-10,000	30,000 or 40,000

Casualties and losses
4,000 killed	13,000 killed
- 15,000 Georgian civilian captives moved to mainland Persia

The Battle of Krtsanisi (Georgian: კრწანისის ბრძოლა, romanized: k'rts'anisis brdzola, Persian: نبرد کرتسانیسی) was fought between the army of Qajar Iran (Persia) and the Georgian armies of the Kingdom of Kartli-Kakheti and Kingdom of Imereti at the place of Krtsanisi near Tbilisi, Georgia, from September 8 to September 11, 1795, as part of Agha Mohammad Khan Qajar's war in response to King Heraclius II of Georgia’s alliance with the Russian Empire. The battle resulted in the decisive defeat of the Georgians, capture, and complete destruction of their capital Tbilisi, as well as the temporary absorption of eastern Georgia into the Iranian empire.

Although the Russian Empire had officially declared in the Treaty of Georgievsk of 1783 that it would protect Heraclius's kingdom against any Iranian attempts to re-subjugate Georgia, Russia did not intervene to protect its ally. Subsequently, in order to restore Russian prestige, Catherine the Great launched a punitive campaign against Iran in 1796, but it was soon recalled after Catherine's death the same year. The reestablishment of Iranian rule over Georgia did not last long, for the shah was assassinated in 1797 in Shusha, and the Georgian king died the year after. With Georgia lying in ruins and the central authorities in Iran occupied with the question of succession, the way was opened for Georgia's annexation by Russia several years later by Tsar Paul.

As Iran could not allow the cession of Transcaucasia and Dagestan, which had been integral parts of Iran for centuries, the Battle of Krtsanisi directly led to two bitter Russo-Persian wars in 1804–1813 and 1826–1828, in which Fath Ali Shah, Agha Mohammad Khan's successor, unsuccessfully attempted to reverse Russian military advances and restore Iranian authority north of the Aras and Kura rivers. After these wars, Iran ceded Transcaucasia and Dagestan to imperial Russia per the Treaty of Gulistan (1813) and the Treaty of Turkmenchay (1828).

== Background ==
Eastern Georgia, composed of the kingdoms of Kartli and Kakheti, had been in the early modern era under Iranian suzerainty since the 1510s. In 1744, Nader Shah had granted the kingship of Kartli and Kakheti to Teimuraz II and his son Heraclius II, respectively, as a reward for their loyalty. When Nader Shah died in 1747, they capitalized on the chaos that had erupted in mainland Iran, and declared de facto independence. After Teimuraz II died in 1762, Heraclius II assumed control over Kartli, and united the two kingdoms in a personal union as the Kingdom of Kartli-Kakheti, becoming the first Georgian ruler to preside over a politically unified eastern Georgia in three centuries. At about the same time, Karim Khan Zand had ascended the Iranian throne; Heraclius II quickly tendered his de jure submission to the new Iranian ruler, however, de facto, he remained autonomous. In 1783, Heraclius placed his kingdom under the protection of the Russian Empire in the Treaty of Georgievsk. In the last few decades of the 18th century, Georgia had become a more important element in Russo-Iranian relations than some provinces in northern mainland Persia, such as Mazandaran or even Gilan. Unlike Peter I, Catherine, the then ruling monarch of Russia, viewed Georgia as a pivot for her Caucasian policy, as Russia's new aspirations were to use it as a base of operations against both Iran and the Ottoman Empire, both immediate bordering geo-political rivals of Russia. On top of that, having another port on the Georgian coast of the Black Sea would be ideal. A limited Russian contingent of two infantry battalions with four artillery pieces arrived in Tbilisi in 1784, but was withdrawn, despite the frantic protests of the Georgians, in 1787 as a new war against Ottoman Turkey had started on a different front.

In the next several years, Russia would be too occupied with Turkey (due to the 1768-74 war), Poland, and the European consequences of the French Revolution to give Georgia much attention. Even the consolidation of the Qajar dynasty under Agha Mohammad Khan, who had become the new owners to the Iranian throne and therefore the new heirs to the geo-politically rivalling empire that had been bordering Russia for centuries, did not divert Catherine from preoccupations in the west. In 1791, when Agha Mohammad Khan was in Tabriz, Heraclius asked General Gudovich, commander of the Russian Caucasian Line, for renewed military aid, but the government in St. Petersburg did not judge it expedient to send troops again to Georgia. In 1792, Gudovich told Heraclius that he would receive only diplomatic support in the advent of any Iranian onslaught. Despite being left to his own devices, Heraclius still cherished a dream of establishing, with Russian protection, a strong and united monarchy, into which the western Georgian Kingdom of Imereti and the lost provinces under Ottoman rule would all eventually be drawn.

The consequences of these events came a few years later, when a new dynasty, the Qajars, emerged victorious in the protracted power struggle in Persia. Their head, Agha Mohammad Khan, as his first objective, resolved to bring the Caucasus again fully under the Persian orbit. For Agha Mohammad Khan, the resubjugation and reintegration of Georgia into the Iranian Empire was part of the same process that had brought Shiraz, Isfahan, and Tabriz under his rule. He viewed, like the Safavids and Nader Shah before him, the territories no differently than the territories in mainland Iran. Georgia was a province of Iran the same way Khorasan was. As the Cambridge History of Iran states, Georgia's permanent secession was inconceivable and had to be resisted in the same way as one would resist an attempt at the separation of Fars or Gilan. It was therefore natural for Agha Mohammad Khan to perform whatever necessary means in the Caucasus in order to subdue and reincorporate the recently lost regions following Nader Shah's death and the demise of the Zands, including putting down what in Iranian eyes was seen as treason on the part of the wali of Georgia.

Finding an interval of peace amid their own quarrels and with northern, western, and central Persia secure, the Persians demanded Heraclius II to renounce the treaty with Russia and to reaccept Persian suzerainty, in return for peace and the security of his kingdom. The Ottomans, Iran's neighboring rival, recognized Iran's rights over Kartli and Kakheti for the first time in four centuries. Heraclius appealed then to his theoretical protector, Empress Catherine II of Russia, pleading for at least 3,000 Russian troops, but he was not listened to, leaving Georgia to fend off the Persian threat alone. Nevertheless, Heraclius II still rejected the Khan's ultimatum.

== Battle ==
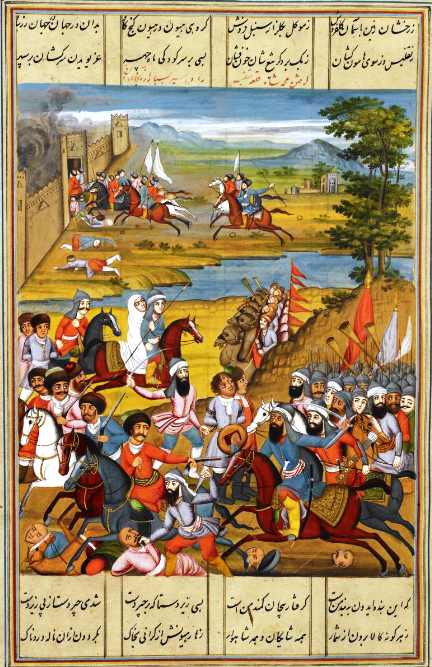
The capture of Tbilisi by Agha Muhammad Khan. A Qajar-era Persian miniature from the British Library.

In August 1795, Agha Mohammad Khan crossed the Aras river with a 70,000-strong army. This force was divided in three: the left wing was sent in the direction of Erivan, the right one parallel to the Caspian Sea into the Mughan across the lower Aras towards Dagestan and Shirvan, while the Shah headed the centre force himself, advancing towards the fortress of Shusha in the Karabakh Khanate, which he besieged between 8 July and 9 August 1795. His right and left wing forced the Khans of Ganja and Erivan into alliance respectively. Having abandoned the siege of Shusha due to stiff resistance, which was further aided by Georgian crown prince Aleksandre, the Khan of Karabakh, Ibrahim Khan, eventually surrendered to Mohammad Khan after discussions, including the paying of regular tribute and to surrender hostages, though the Qajar forces were still denied entrance to Shusha. Since the main objective was Georgia, Mohammad Khan was willing to have Karabakh secured by this agreement for now, for he and his army subsequently moved further. While at Ganja, having secured Shirvan, he was joined by Javad Khan Qajar and the rest of his right wing contingent. At Ganja, Mohammad Khan sent Heraclius his last ultimatum, who received it in September 1795:

Your Highness knows that for the past 100 generations you have been subject to Iran; now we deign to say with amazement that you have attached yourself to the Russians, who have no other business than to trade with Iran... Last year you forced me to destroy a number of Georgians, although we had no desire at all for our subjects to perish by our own hand...It is now our great will that you, an intelligent man, abandon such things... and break relations with the Russians. If you do not carry out this order, then we shall shortly carry out a campaign against Georgia, we will shed both Georgian and Russian blood and out of it will create rivers as big as the Kura....

According to the author of the Fārsnāma-ye Nāṣeri, Ḥasan-e Fasāʼi, a contemporary Qajar era historian, Agha Mohammad Khan had declared in the letter:

"Shah Ismail I Safavi ruled over the province of Georgia. When in the days of the deceased king we were engaged in conquering the provinces of Persia, we did not proceed to this region. As most of the provinces of Persia have come into our possession now, you must, according to ancient law, consider Georgia (Gurjistan) part of the empire, and appear before our majesty. You have to conform your obedience; then you may remain in the possession of your governorship (wali) of Georgia. If you do not do this, you will be treated as the others".

His advisors divided, Heraclius ignored the ultimatum, but he sent couriers to St. Petersburg. Gudovich, who sat in Georgievsk at the time, instructed Heraclius to avoid "expense and fuss", while Heraclius, together with Solomon II and some Imeretians, headed southwards of Tbilisi to fend off the Iranians.

Agha Mohammad Khan, at the same time, marched directly on Tbilisi, with half of the army he crossed the Aras River with, though other estimations mention 40,000 instead of 35,000, and attacked the heavily fortified Georgian positions of Heraclius and Solomon on the southwestern limits of the city. Abandoned by several of his nobles, Heraclius II managed to mobilize around 5,000 troops, including some 2,000 auxiliaries from neighbouring Imereti under his king Solomon II, a member of the Georgian Bagrationi dynasty and maternal grandson of Heraclius II. The Georgians offered a desperate resistance and succeeded in rolling back a series of Persian attacks on September 9 and 10. After that, it is said that some traitors informed the Persians that the Georgians had no more strength to fight, and the Qajars army cancelled their plan of going back to Persia, which they previously had. Early on September 11, Agha Mohammad Khan personally led an all-out offensive against the Georgians. Amid an artillery duel and a fierce cavalry charge, the Persians managed to cross the Kura River and outflank the decimated Georgian army. Heraclius II attempted to mount a counterattack, but he had to retreat to the last available positions in the outskirts of Tbilisi. By nightfall, the Georgian forces had been exhausted and almost completely destroyed. The last surviving Georgian artillery briefly held the advancing Persians to allow Heraclius II and his retinue of some 150 men to escape through the city to the mountains. The fighting continued in the streets of Tbilisi and at the fortress of Narikala. In a few hours, Agha Mohammad Khan was in full control of the Georgian capital, which was completely sacked and its population massacred. Among those killed in the city was the archbishop of Tbilisi, Doistheus. The Persian army marched back laden with spoil and carrying off some 15,000 captives. The Georgians had lost 4,000 men in the battle, the Iranians 13,000; a third of their total force.

An eye-witness, having entered the city several days after the bulk of the Iranian troops had withdrawn, described what he saw:

I therefore pursued my way, paved as it were, with carcases, and entered Tiflis by the gate of Tapitag: but what was my consternation on finding here the bodies of women and children slaughtered by the sword of the enemy; to say nothing about the men, of whom I saw more than a thousand, as I should suppose, lying dead in one little tower! (...) The city was almost entirely consumed, and still continued to smoke in different places; and the stench from the putrefying, together with the heat which prevailed, was intolerable, and certainly infectious.

== Aftermath ==
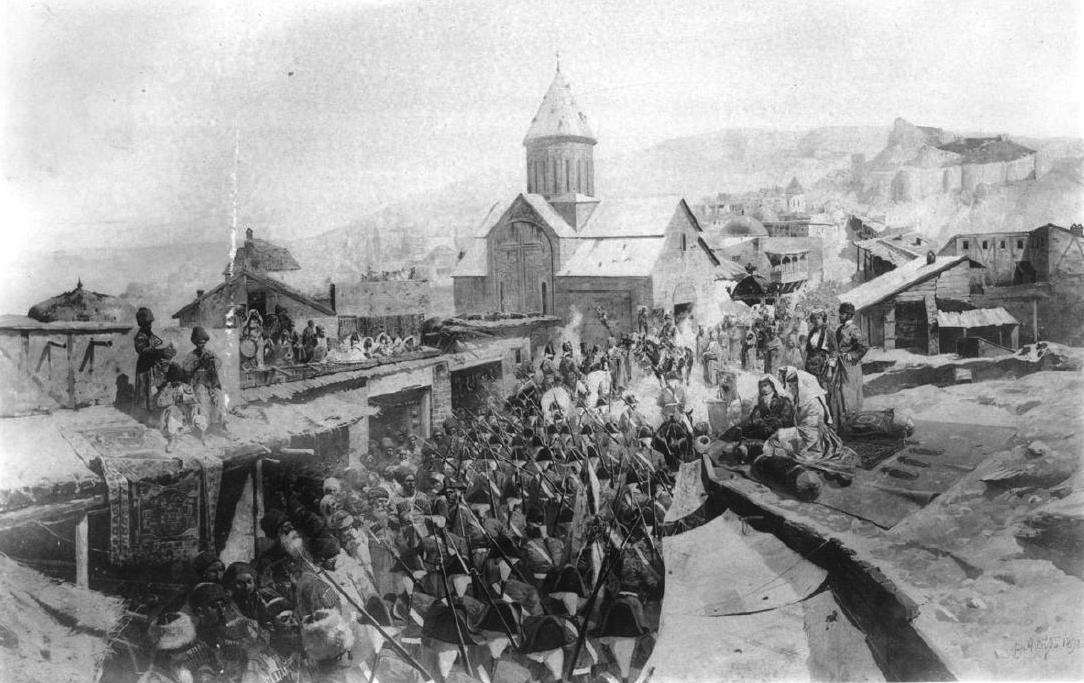
Entrance of the Russian troops in Tiflis, 26 November 1799, by Franz Roubaud, 1886

On his return, after the conquest of Tbilisi and being in effective control of eastern Georgia, (Note: "In the late 18th century Āḡā Moḥammad Khan, with the military forces he was able to muster, successfully established Qajar rule throughout Iran and temporarily drove the forces of the advancing Russian empire back beyond Tbilisi, reasserting Iranian supremacy over the kingdom of Georgia.") Agha Mohammad was formally crowned Shah in 1796 in the Mughan plain, just like his predecessor Nader Shah was about sixty years earlier. As The Cambridge History of Iran notes; "Russia's client, Georgia, had been punished, and Russia's prestige, damaged." Heraclius II returned to Tbilisi to rebuild the city, but the destruction of his capital was a death blow to his hopes and projects. Upon learning of the fall of Tbilisi, General Gudovich put the blame on the Georgians themselves. To restore Russian prestige, Catherine II declared war on Persia, upon the proposal of Gudovich, and sent an army under Valerian Zubov to the Qajar possessions on April of that year, but the new Tsar Paul I, who succeeded Catherine in November, shortly recalled it.

Agha Mohammad Shah was later assassinated while preparing a second expedition against Georgia in 1797 in Shusha and the seasoned king Heraclius died early in 1798. Reassessment of Iranian hegemony over Georgia did not last long; in 1799 the Russians marched into Tbilisi. The next two years were a time of muddle and confusion, and the weakened and devastated Georgian kingdom, with its capital half in ruins, was easily absorbed by Russia in 1801. As Iran could not permit or allow the cession of Transcaucasia and Dagestan the consequences of the Krtsanisi battle would also directly lead up to two wars between the nations. The Russo-Persian War (1804-1813) and Russo-Persian War (1826-1828) would eventually force the cession of the aforementioned regions to Imperial Russia per the Gulistan and Turkmenchay of 1813 and 1828 respectively.

== See also ==
- Three Hundred Aragvians
- List of Georgian battles
- Persian Expedition of 1796

== Sources ==
- Ates, Abdurrahman (Spring 2014). "Ağa Muhammed Han'in Kafkasya Seferlerİ Ve Osmanli-İran İlİşkİlerİ (1795-1797)" [Ağa Muhammed Khan's Caucasian Expeditions And Ottoman-Iran Relations (1795-1797)]. Karadeniz İncelemeleri Dergisi [Journal of Black Sea Studies]. 8 (16): 49.
- Avery, Peter; Hambly, Gavin R. G.; Melville, Charles P., eds. (1991). Volume 7 - From Nadir Shah to the Islamic Republic. Cambridge University Press. ISBN 9780521200950.
- Fisher, William Bayne; Avery, P.; Hambly, G. R. G; Melville, C. (1991). The Cambridge History of Iran. Vol. 7. Cambridge: Cambridge University Press. ISBN 0521200954.
- Mikaberidze, Alexander, ed. (2011). Conflict and Conquest in the Islamic World: A Historical Encyclopedia. Vol. 1. ABC-CLIO. ISBN 978-1598843361.
- Rayfield, Donald (2012). Edge of Empires: A History of Georgia. Reaktion Books. ISBN 9781780230306.
- Suny, Ronald G. (1994). The Making of the Georgian Nation. Indiana University Press. ISBN 9780253209153.
