= Shahverdi Khan of Ganja =

Khan of Ganja
- Reign: 1747 – 1768
- Successor: Muhammad Hasan Khan
- Died: 1768; Ganja, Ganja Khanate
- Noble family: Ziyadoghlu Qajar
- Father: Kelb Ali Musahib-Ganjavi

Shahverdi Khan Ziyadoghlu (died 1768) was the beylerbey of Karabakh from 1740 to 1743 and first khan of Ganja from 1747 to 1768. He was from the Ziyadoglu branch of the Qajar clan who ruled the Beylerbeylik of Karabakh as hereditary governors.

== Background ==
After the dethronement of the Safavids in 1736 by Nader Shah, the landed classes of Ganja and Karabakh gathered in Mughan and decided to oppose the new shah and agreed to try to restore the Safavids to the throne. His father Ughurlu Khan was among them. When this news reached Nader Shah, he ordered all Muslim landowners of the region and their families deported to Khorasan (northeastern Iran) as punishment. Ughurlu Khan's lands on the other hand were divided - the Zangezur district was given to the beglarbeg (governor-general) of Tabriz; the autonomy of the Armenian Melikdoms was restored, and Borchalu, Qazzaq and Shamshadil were given to the Georgian king Teimuraz II (r. 1732–1762). Ughurlu Khan was thus only left with Ganja and its surroundings. Ughurlu was later killed in November 1738 during a campaign together with Nader's brother Ebrahim against Qazikumukh.

== Reign ==
Shahverdi became beylerbey in 1740, succeeding his father. However, he later supported Sam Mirza, a pretender who claimed to be son of Shah Soltan Hussein and was forced to seek exile in Georgia after facing an attack from Nasrullah Mirza, son of Nader. Nader appointed his tupchibashi Hajji Khan from Çemişgezek as new beylerbey. Soon after Nader's assassination in 1747 and the ensuing anarchy in Iran, he defeated and killed his brother or uncle Muhammadrahim with help from Melik Atham of Jraberd. He also defeated Hajji with help from Teimuraz II and Heraclius II, to whom in return he pledged an annual tribute of 10.000 tomans. New contender for Iranian throne, Amir Aslan Khan Afshar, the governor of Azerbaijan soon emerged in the region and attacked Ganja but was defeated near Barda in 1748 by Shahverdi Khan.

In ensuing years, his neighbor to the south Panah Ali Khan grew his power and took Zangezur - which was previously belonged to Shahverdi's ancestors - from Nader's brother. This caused a brief alliance between Ganja, the Khanate of Shaki and the remaining Melikdoms of Karabakh. As a result, Panah attacked Shahverdi in 1749 and subdued him, forcing Shahverdi's daughter Tuti to marry his son Ibrahim Khalil alongside 450 tomans of tribute. According to Mirza Adigozal bey, he also kept his sons (one of them being future Javad Khan) as hostage in Shahbulag. Under pressure from all directions, Shahverdi even appealed Ottomans for alliance in 1750, citing absence of a shah in Iran.

In 1750 and 1752, Teimuraz II attacked Ganja and forced Panah Ali to retreat from area at the request of Shahverdi who sent his brother Reza Qoli as an envoy. Heraclius then allied himself to Haji Chalabi of Shaki to raid Djaro-Belokani, only to be betrayed by the latter, who defeated the Georgian army. Using this opportunity, Panah Ali allied himself with Shahverdi Khan, Kazim Khan of Karadagh, Hasan Ali Khan of Erivan, Heydarqoli Khan of Nakhchivan against Haji Chalabi of Shaki the same year and invited Heraclius II of Georgia to their alliance. During the negotiations near Qızılqaya, the Georgian detachments, hiding in ambush, surrounded and captured five khans along with their retinue. Haji Chalabi, having learned about the conspiracy of Heraclius II, gathered an army and began to pursue Heraclius, attacked him and defeated him in the battle at the river Aghstafa, having freed all the captured khans. Haji Chelebi appointed his son Agha Kishi beg as ruler of newly conquered lands.

Effectively Haji Chalabi's vassal now, he joined the campaign led by Agha Kishi beg against Teimuraz in 1752, but didn't achieve any results. He later joined the campaign led by Haji and Muhammad II of Tabasaran against Karabakh Khanate in 1754, forcing Panah Ali to return some territories to Shahverdi. In 1757, Muhammad Hasan Khan arrived in Karabakh to gather troops to fight against Karim Khan Zand. Panah Ali refused to join his armies and battled against the Qajar troops. Muhammad Hasan Khan soon left for Iran and left his cannons in the area, which were later taken by Panah Ali. Panah later accused Shahverdi of inviting Muhammad Hasan to region and sent his son Ibrahim against him, who managed to capture the city and send the khan to Shusha. However, he soon faced another invasion from south, this time by Fath-Ali Khan Afshar, Khan of Urmia, in 1759. Using the opportunity, Shahverdi fled from prison and submitted to him, who reinstalled him as khan in Ganja. Shahverdi managed to get support from Teimuraz again in 1761.

He was assassinated by one of his subordinates in 1768. He was succeeded by his son Muhammad Hasan Khan in 1768, however some sources consider 1761 as his succession year.

== Family ==
He had several sons and daughters with his wives Sharafjahan Khanum and Gulgoncha (an Armenian):

1. Muhammad Khan (1738-1780)
2. Tuti begüm (1740-1760) — married to Ibrahim Khalil of Karabakh in 1749
3. Muhammad Hasan Khan (1742-1792) — married to a sister of Surkhai Khan (1680-1748) of Qazikumukh
4. Khurshid begüm (b. 1743) — married to Ibrahim Khalil of Karabakh in 1761, mother of Mehdigulu Khan Javanshir and Aghabeyim agha
5. Khayrunnisa begüm — married to Huseyn Khan, a prince of Shaki and after his death to Mammad Hasan agha Javanshir
6. Rahim Khan
7. Javad Khan (1749-1804)
8. Feth Ali Agha (d. 1825)

== Sources ==
- Bournoutian, George (2021). From the Kur to the Aras: A Military History of Russia's Move into the South Caucasus and the First Russo-Iranian War, 1801–1813. Brill. ISBN 978-9004445154.
- Babayev, Elgun (2003). Из истории Гянджинского ханства [From the history of the Ganja Khanate] (PDF) (in Russian). Baku: Nurlan.

Preceded by Created	Khan of Ganja; 1747–1768	Succeeded by Muhammad Hasan Khan
