= Mehr Ali Beg Javanshir =

Khan of the Karabakh Khanate

Mehr Ali Beg Javanshir (Persian: مهرعلی‌بیگ جوانشیر) was the son of the Panah Ali Khan, the khan of the Karabakh Khanate, whom he according to historian Ahmad Beg Javanshir, briefly succeeded. However, this event is not mentioned by historians Abbasgulu Bakikhanov and Adigozal Beg. Shortly after his succession, Mehr Ali Beg was reportedly ousted by brother Ibrahim Khalil Khan, and was later killed either by Aghasi Khan and his son or only by the latter's eldest son Ahmad Khan.

== Biography ==
Mehr Ali Beg was a son of Panah Ali Khan, the khan of the Karabakh Khanate. While the historians Abbasgulu Bakikhanov and Adigozal Beg report that Mehr Ali Beg's brother Ibrahim Khalil Khan succeeded their father as khan, the historian Ahmad Beg Javanshir reports a different story. According to him, Mehr Ali succeeded his father as khan while Ibrahim Khalil Khan and Panah Ali Khan was taken as hostages to the city of Shiraz by the Zand ruler Karim Khan Zand (r. 1751–1779). However, after Ibrahim Khalil Khan's return in 1761, (Note: According to historian George Bournoutian, the date is "totally inaccurate".) Mehr Ali Beg was frequently addressed as "beg" instead of "khan".

The two brothers had disagreements on who should rule Karabakh. After marrying the sister of Umma Khan V of the Avar Khanate, Ibrahim Khalil Khan established his authority in Karabakh. Mehr Ali Beg then escaped to Karim Khan, who attempted to have Hedayat Khan, the ruler of Ardabil, take Ibrahim Khalil Khan's place but was unable to. Following Karim Khan's death in 1779, Mehr Ali Beg sought refuge under Fath-Ali Khan, the khan of the Quba Khanate. In 1783/84, Mehr Ali Beg was killed by Fath-Ali Khan's subordinate Aghasi Khan and his son, who as a result were dismissed by Fath-Ali Khan. A different account of Mehr Ali Beg's death is provided by Bakikhanov, who states that he was killed by Aghasi Khan's eldest son Ahmad Khan during a war between Fath-Ali Khan against Aghasi Khan and his ally Mohammad Hasan Khan.

== Sources ==
- Bournoutian, George (1994). A History of Qarabagh: An Annotated Translation of Mirza Jamal Javanshir Qarabaghi's Tarikh-e Qarabagh. Mazda Publishers. ISBN 978-1568590110.
