= Javad Khan =

Khan of Ganja (c. 1748 – 1804)

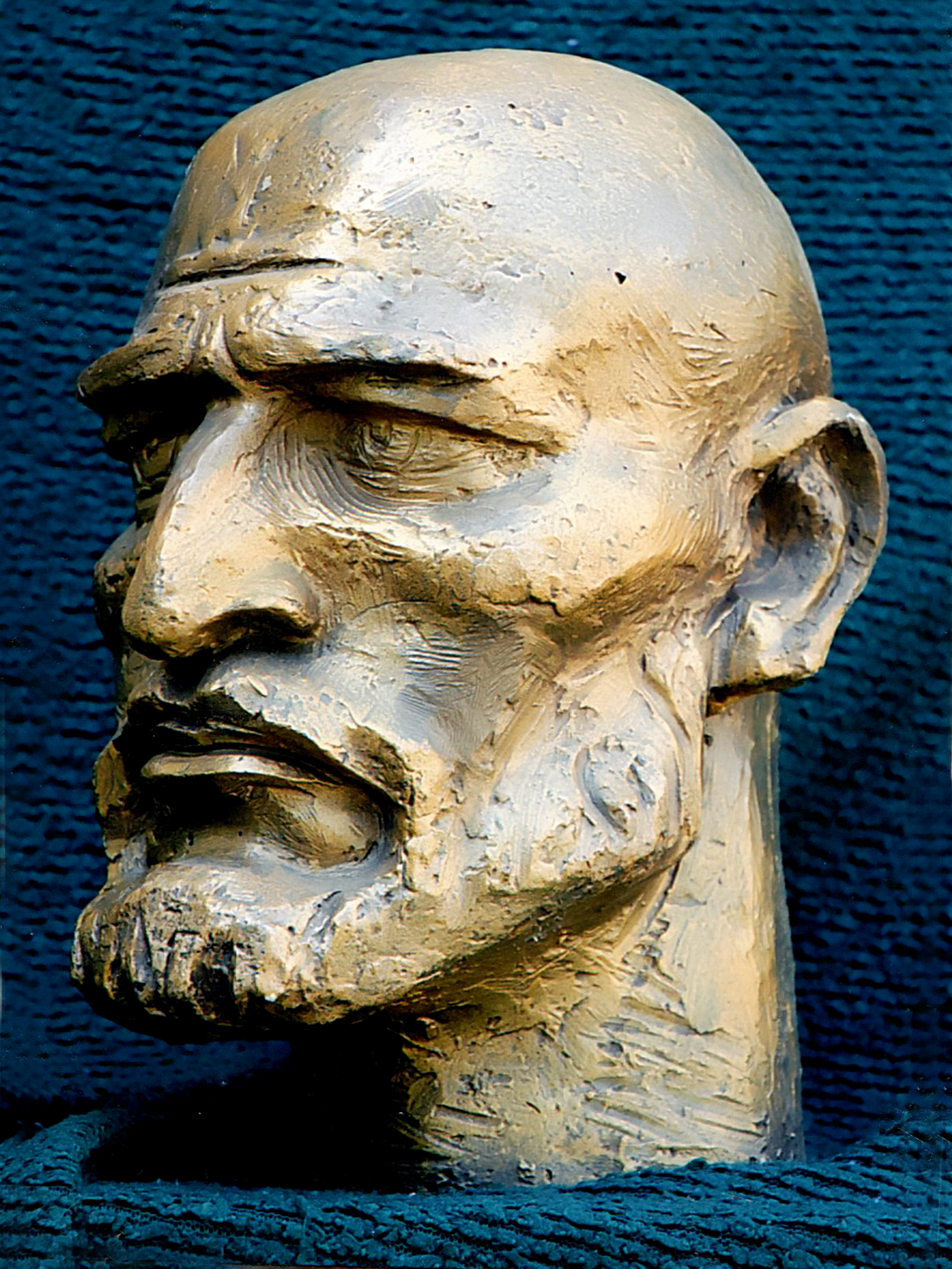
- Bust of Javad Khan by Gorkhmaz Sujaddinov

Khan of Ganja
- Reign: 1786 – 15 January [O.S. 3 January] 1804
- Predecessor: Rahim Khan
- Successor: Khanate liquidated
- Born: 1748
- Died: 15 January 1804 (aged 55–56)
- Buried: Tomb of Javad Khan
- Noble family: Ziyadoghlu Qajar
- Father: Shahverdi Khan
- Mother: Sharafjahan Khanum

Javad Khan (Persian: جواد خان قاجار, romanized: Javād Khān-e Qājār); c. 1748 – 1804) was a member of Ziyadoghlu Qajar, a clan of the Qajar tribe, as well as the sixth and the last khan of the Ganja Khanate from 1786 to 1804 before it was annexed by the Russian Empire.

== Background ==
Javad was born in 1748 to Shahverdi Khan and his wife Sharafjahan Khanum. He fled to Ibrahim Khalil Khan of Karabakh in 1778 when his elder half-brother Muhammad Khan of Ganja usurped the throne and started to kill all his relatives.

== Early reign ==
Javad Khan succeeded his brother Rahim Khan after his deposition through Georgian-Karabakh intervention in 1786. With the accession to power, Javad Khan faced a threat from Georgia. In order to somehow appease Heraclius II, Ibrahim Khan decided to cede Shamkhor to Georgia. He managed to convince Javad Khan that such a step is being taken for the sake of the security of Ganja from Georgia. Javad Khan's representative, Armenian melik Misael (head of Gazakh Armenians), Ibrahim Khalil's envoy Hazrat Qoli and Prince Kaikhosro Andronikashvili (Georgian ambassador to Karabakh) went to report to Heraclius that Ganja has no claims to Shamkhor. In turn, the representative of Javad Khan, melik Misail, reported that as a sign of friendship, Javad sends half of his annual income to the king. However, at the insistence of colonel Stepan Burnashev, head of the Russian military-diplomatic mission in Georgia, Heraclius refused the treaty and demanded from Ibrahim Khalil to abandon Ganja to his authority in full.

Outraged by these demands of Heraclius, the envoys of Karabakh returned home. These events greatly worsened relations with Georgia, and by the end of 1786 they took on a clearly hostile character. At the beginning of 1787, Heraclius, who had up to 6000 soldiers under arms, suggested that colonel Burnashev make a joint Russian-Georgian campaign against Ganja and Karabakh. However, pursuing a wait-and-see policy, Burnashev evaded this proposal, arguing that Karabakh was allegedly an Iranian possession thus attacking it could potentially resume hostilities with Iran. Heraclius also supported the Armenian meliks Abov and Mejlum - respectively meliks of Gulistan and Jraberd - who had been at enmity with the khan of Karabakh all these years. Armenians from the territory of the Ganja Khanate in the amount of 2500 households also decided to move to Georgia under the leadership of melik Misail, the former envoy of Javad Khan. However, melik Misail could not put his plan into practice, because he was soon arrested by the supporters of Javad Khan.

Yet another unrest started the same year in Ganja, trying to use opportunity in September 1787, a combined Georgian and Russian army under the command of Colonel Burnashev marched to Ganja. However, Ibrahim Khalil Khan's march on Armenian meliks and stopped any hope for support from southern side. However, the meliks, who had been waiting for this campaign for a long time, turned to Heraclius II with a request to help them resettle in Georgia. Heraclius II sent a 4000-strong army led by Prince Orbeliani and his son Prince Iulon to help them. The negotiations that began with Javad Khan were suddenly interrupted, because on September 13 an order came from Pavel Potemkin on the immediate withdrawal of Russian battalions from the South Caucasus due to the start of the Russian-Turkish war. Burnashev, who, nevertheless, wanted to fulfill the order of Heraclius, but couldn't waive the order of his superiors, stayed at Ganja for another three days. His request, sent by courier to Potemkin, to leave the battalion in Georgia at least until spring, was also rejected. In early October 1787, Burnashev's Russian battalions left for Vladikavkaz. After a series of battles and depriving of one more ally, the Georgian troops were also forced to retreat. A fragile peace ensued and the Georgian king Erekle II granted Javad Khan control over Shamshadil, in return Javad returned part of the inhabitants of Borchali and Qazakh to the Georgian king.

Meanwhile, Heraclius II managed to establish diplomatic relations with Fath Ali Khan of Quba. For this purpose, Prince Georgi Tsitsishvili and Gurgen bek Enikolopashvili were Georgian ambassadors to Quba, while Mirza Rahim, Fatali Khan's envoy Haji, was sent to Tiflis. This circumstance made it possible for Heraclius not only to strengthen his rear, but also to have an ally in the fight against the Karabakh Khan, who dominated Ganja. In December 1788, Heraclius now allied with Fath Ali Khan of Quba and Muhammad Hasan Khan of Shaki was able to capture the outskirts of Ganja. In early 1789, Georgian troops led by the son of Heraclius, Prince Vakhtang, defeated Javad Khan. The matter worsened for Karabakh by the fact that the ally of Ibrahim Khan, Umma Khan of the Avar Khanate, due to illness, could not help his ally.

Fatali Khan and Muhammad Hasan Khan met with King Heraclius in January 1789, inside the Ganja Khanate, on the left bank of the Shamkhor River. Javad Khan also took part in this meeting, shortly before that he presented the “keys to the fortress” to the Quba Khan. Allies worked out a plan of coordinated actions against Karabakh Khanate and divided the spheres of influence: Heraclius took the entire South Caucasus, Fatali Khan was to control Iranian Azerbaijan. Heraclius II and Fatali Khan decided to actively fight against the newly rising threat of Agha Muhammad Khan Qajar and "act ... under the auspices of Russia," according to contemporary historian Abbasqulu Bakikhanov. Heraclius decided to return the Shamshadil to the Ganja, but received a certain autonomy. However, immediately after the meeting Fath Ali Khan fell ill, left for Baku to stay with his sister and died there on 22 March 1789, which made it easier for Javad Khan to resume his reign.

== Later reign ==
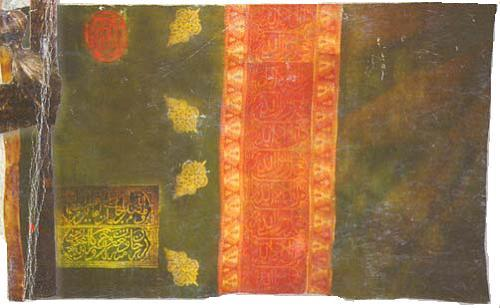
One of the captured warflags of Javad Khan in Ganja Khanate, 1804

Year 1789 also marked the start of the reign of Agha Muhammad in Iran. Javad Khan was the first to submit to him and acknowledge him as shah. In August 1795, Agha Mohammad Khan crossed the Aras river with a 70,000-strong army. This force was divided in three: the left wing was sent in the direction of Erivan, the right one parallel to the Caspian Sea into the Mughan across the lower Aras towards Dagestan and Shirvan, while the Shah headed the centre force himself, advancing towards the fortress of Shusha in the Karabakh Khanate, which he besieged between 8 July and 9 August 1795. Having abandoned the siege of Shusha due to stiff resistance, which was further aided by Georgian crown prince Aleksandre, the Khan of Karabakh, Ibrahim Khan, eventually surrendered to Agha Mohammad Khan after discussions. He paid a regular tribute and surrendered hostages, though the Qajar forces were still denied entrance to Shusha. Since the main objective was Georgia, Agha Mohammad Khan was willing to have Karabakh secured by this agreement for now, for he and his army subsequently moved further. While at Ganja, having secured Shirvan, he was joined by Javad Khan, Armenian meliks Abov and Mejlum and the rest of his right wing contingent.

At Ganja, Agha Mohammad Khan sent Heraclius II his last ultimatum, inviting him to submit. However, receiving no reply, the shah marched on Tiflis, guided by Javad. After a three-day battle which resulted in the destruction of the Georgian forces, Agha Mohammad Khan and his army marched into Tiflis. Massacring, burning, and plundering the city for 9 days and taking thousands as slaves, the shah left the city in ruins and moved on to capture Shaki and Shirvan Khanates. Having lost his patron after the departure of the Iranian troops for Khorasan, Javad Khan tried to smooth out his relations with Heraclius. However, in February 1796 Heraclius sent a 3000-strong army to Ganja under the leadership of his son Alexander to punish Javad for siding with the Qajar shah. But the latter's army soon deserted him. Immediately after him, Ibrahim Khalil and his brother-in-law Umma Khan besieged Ganja in March 1796. While Heraclius was gathering the army for the second time, Ibrahim Khan began negotiations with Javad Khan, and as soon as the news of the departure of Heraclius' troops from Tiflis reached him, he concluded an alliance with Ganja. Having taken from him an indemnity in the amount of 10,000 rubles and Javad's son and sister as hostages, the Karabakh khan retreated from the fortress. The Avar Khan was content with the fact that he received 40 rubles for each of his warriors and also returned to his own domain.

When in May 1796 the troops of Heraclius II approached the walls of Ganja, they were able to return 400 prisoners who were in Ganja and, not wanting to complicate the situation, returned to Tiflis, waiting for promised Russian support, as Queen Catherine used the sack of Tiflis to justify an invasion of the South Caucasus in March 1796, and issued a manifesto, written in Persian and Armenian, addressed to all the khans and other lords. Thus, Persian Expedition of 1796 started, which was headed by Russian general Valerian Zubov. Javad Khan, in his September appeal to Zubov, mentioning the Iranian threat, asked for the speedy arrival of Russian troops in Ganja. Such a motivation, apparently, was chosen by Javad Khan to please the Russian government, to whose protection he wanted to join due to the threat from Karabakh and Kartli-Kakheti.

Soon on December 13, a detachment of Russian troops reached Ganja and occupied the fortress without resistance. Javad Khan personally presented the keys to the city gates, trying to show himself as a loyal man and even signed swore of fealty. Then, at the request of the Russian general, Javad Khan was forced to clear the fortress from the inhabitants and place a Russian garrison in it. He himself received permission to stay with his family in the fortress for a maximum of 6 days. However, this occupation didn't last much as Catherine soon died and Paul I recalled Russian troops back. However, the Russian government did not want to deal with the recalcitrant and unreliable Javad Khan in the future. In this regard, according to Abbasqulu Bakikhanov, "when the Russians left the Ganja fortress, they gave it not to him (i.e. Javad Khan), but to the Georgian Wali - Heraclius Khan of Georgia. Ibrahim Khan of Karabakh and Selim Khan of Sheki came with troops to Ganja in order to approve Ali-Sultan of Shamshadil as its ruler on behalf of Heraclius Khan. Javad Khan wanted to escape, but his wife Shukufa Khanum stopped him and sent Ali Sultan a reminder that when he was in prison and was doomed to death, she asked Javad Khan for freedom and forgiveness. Touched by the memory, Ali-Sultan immediately appeared to Javad Khan, submitted to him and renounced all claims to control. Then the people and all other khans, marveling at his generosity, left Javad Khan with his dignity". Javad Khan again managed to maintain his power in Ganja. Soon Agha Muhammad returned to Caucasus in 1797 after his Khorasan campaign to punish Azerbaijani khans for submission to Russia. Javad hoping for his old merits, at the demand of Agha Muhammad Shah, in early June, appeared in Shusha. But, accusing Javad Khan of not showing resistance to the Russians, Agha Muhammad Shah, under the threat of execution, imprisoned him. But his campaign cut short on June 17, 1797 when he was assassinated in Shusha fortress. Javad Khan, using the opportunity, escaped from prison.

== Last years ==
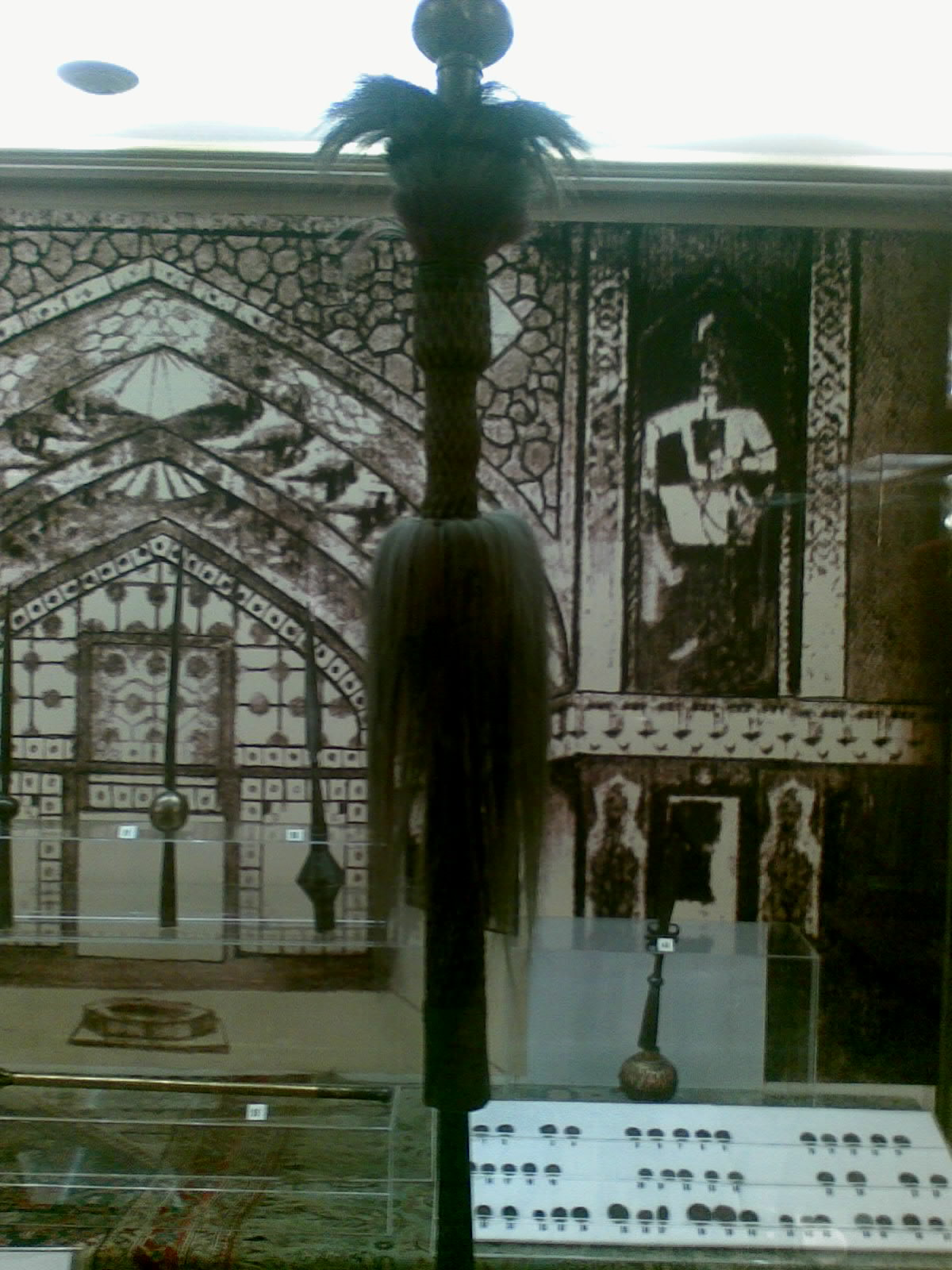
Tug of Javad Khan, kept in National History Museum of Azerbaijan

Emperor Paul decided to return to Caucasus militarily on August 19, 1798. Next year Lieutenant-General Karl Knorring was appointed commander-in-chief of the Russian troops in Georgia, his subordinate Ivan Petrovich Lazarev arriving in Georgia before him. However, the relocation of Russian troops to Georgia clearly contradicted the aspirations of many rulers of South Caucasus and Dagestan, as well as the Iranian Shah, who were aware of Russia's far-sighted policy towards this region. Umma V despite the Russian protection on August 26, 1800, began to make frequent raids on Eastern Georgia, as well as on the nearby regions, including the Ganja Khanate. In his letter to George XII, Mammad Hasan Khan of Sheki, notifying him of the intentions of Umma Khan in relation to Eastern Georgia, also reported an attack on the possessions of the Ganja Khan. However, judging by the letter, in the struggle with the troops of Javad Khan, the Mountainers were defeated, having lost the battle with 104 dead and 30 captives. Having suffered a defeat at Ganja, Umma Khan, however, did not abandon his intentions towards Javad Khan. According to the same letter, Ibrahim Khan actively helped him in this matter, providing the Dagestanis with troops and cannons to help.

George XII of Georgia died on 28 December 1800 provided a fertile ground for Javad Khan to claim Kazakh and Shamshadil, despite Russian presence, like the Dagestanis, he also made frequent raids to Georgia. Knorring pointed out Javad's ambitions when he presented his request on the annexation of Georgia to new tsar Alexander I. Before and during the first Russo-Persian War (1804-1813), Ganja was considered by Russians as a town of foremost importance as it was on the road from Tiflis to Iran. Realizing this, Javad ordered his son Hosein Qoli Aqa to move Ayrum tribe and Armenians from Shamshadil to Ganja, in order to deprive Russians of economic potential. As a reaction, Knorring ordered Lazarev to move on Shamshadil in 1802, latter however realized there will be no supplies and retreated to Borchali. Outraged by failures on the field, the Russian emperor replaced Knorring with the energetic and devoted Pavel Tsitsianov on 19 September 1802. However the latter took up his duties in Georgia only in February 1803.

Tsitsianov quickly moved on to abolish the sultanates of Kazakh and Shamshadil in the summer of 1803 and moved on to Ganja. General Pavel Tsitsianov approached Javad khan several times asking him to submit to Russian rule, but each time was refused. In November 1803, Tsitsianov marched with the Russian army composed of 6 battalions of infantry and 3 cavalry squadrons from Tiflis. Tsitsianov wrote a letter on 10 December 1803 to Javad Khan, claiming that Ganja belonged to Kingdom of Georgia during Queen Tamar's time (1184-1213) and Russia now as the legal guardian of Georgia was merely claiming what is theirs. Javad Khan's reply letter to Tsitsianov instead reminded him of a more recent history and Safavid dominion:

The letter of "Javad Khan" to "Tsitsianov" (1218.AH) (1182 AP / 1803 A.D)
At this time, the letter that you sent has been received. And you wrote:" In the era of Tamar, the land of Dedeh-faal of Ganja was subordinate to Georgia. No one has ever heard of such words. But know that our ancestors like Abbas Qoli Khan and others were rulers of Georgia and if you do not believe this, then question the old folks of Georgia with regards to the Abbas Qoli Khan and ask them if he was the ruler or not.[As a sign of this proof,] currently his mosque and market place are in Georgia. And the kingly clothes bestowed upon his servants as well as his letters/documents are with the people of Georgia. From the days of the Erekli Khan's father and our father, the borders between Ganja and Georgia were clearly defined. And we do not need to mention these facts, because if we say that our ancestors were the sovereigns of Georgia, no one on your side will believe it and they will not bestow Georgia upon us.

You also wrote, six years ago, I gave away the fort of Ganja to the ruler of Russia. This is true, at that time, your ruler wrote letters to all the provinces of Iran and also to us and we accepted the letter and gave the fort. Whenever the king[of Russia] wrote us a decree with regards to Ganja, then make that decree clear so that we may observe that decree and apply it. And you wrote to us “We were a client of Georgia”, then know it that right now the letter of your king [the king of Russia] is in our hands and in that letter, you can see that our title was Beglarbegi of Ganja and not a client of Georgia and thus your words are in contradiction with your [own] decree. And the other thing that when we get under the rule of the Russian king, the Iranian king were to Khorasan and we could not reach him, and due to that [fact] the king of Russia is also great, we accepted his obedience, but now, thanks to god, the Iranian king is near and his servant general has come to us and also his army, and more of them will come [to help us].

You also wrote that “Georgia belongs to the king [of Russia] and you [i.e. Javad Khan] obtain fees from the merchants”. This is correct, but the first day that you entered Georgia, we wrote to you and sent men and made it clear that the Nasib is our servant and he has become rebellious and he had seized the belongings of the merchants under our command and we thought that you were the servant of the [Russian] king and you would do justice to the Court and take back the belongings of our merchants and hand us Nasib and other Shamss al-dinlu's who have become rebellious to us, but you did nothing. And you can see yourself – and don't relay on the saying of the others – that the goods that we took, was from the Shamkori servants that are from Ganja and not from the Georgians.

And whenever you seek for a battle, know that we are ready for battle and if you boast about your cannon and guns, thanks to the mercy God, our cannon and guns is no less than yours. And if your cannons are one gaz know that our cannons are three/four gazs and victory is [only] due to God. And how do you know if you are braver than the Qizilbash, you have seen yourself fighting but have not seen the fighting of the Qizilbash. And you have written that to us to be ready for battle. From the time that you came to Shamss al-Dinlu and brought our people under your command, we have been preparing and we are ready for the day of battle if you want to fight. And when you wrote:" If you do not accept our words in this letter then misfortune will strike”, we know such thoughts have brought you here. Fate has brought you from Moscow to that misfortune here. With the will of God, the highest, may your misfortune become apparent.

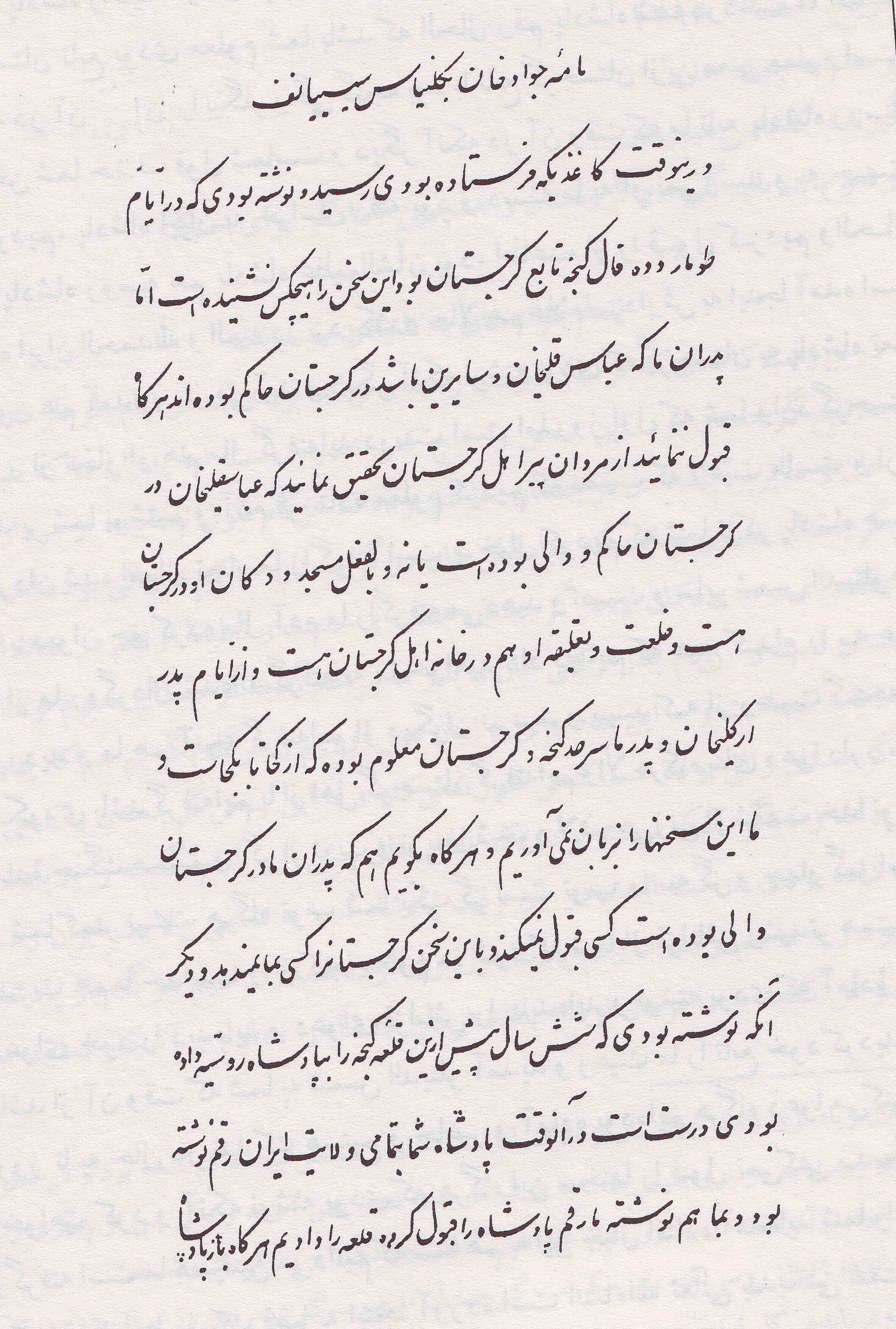
Javad Khan to Tsitsianov page1

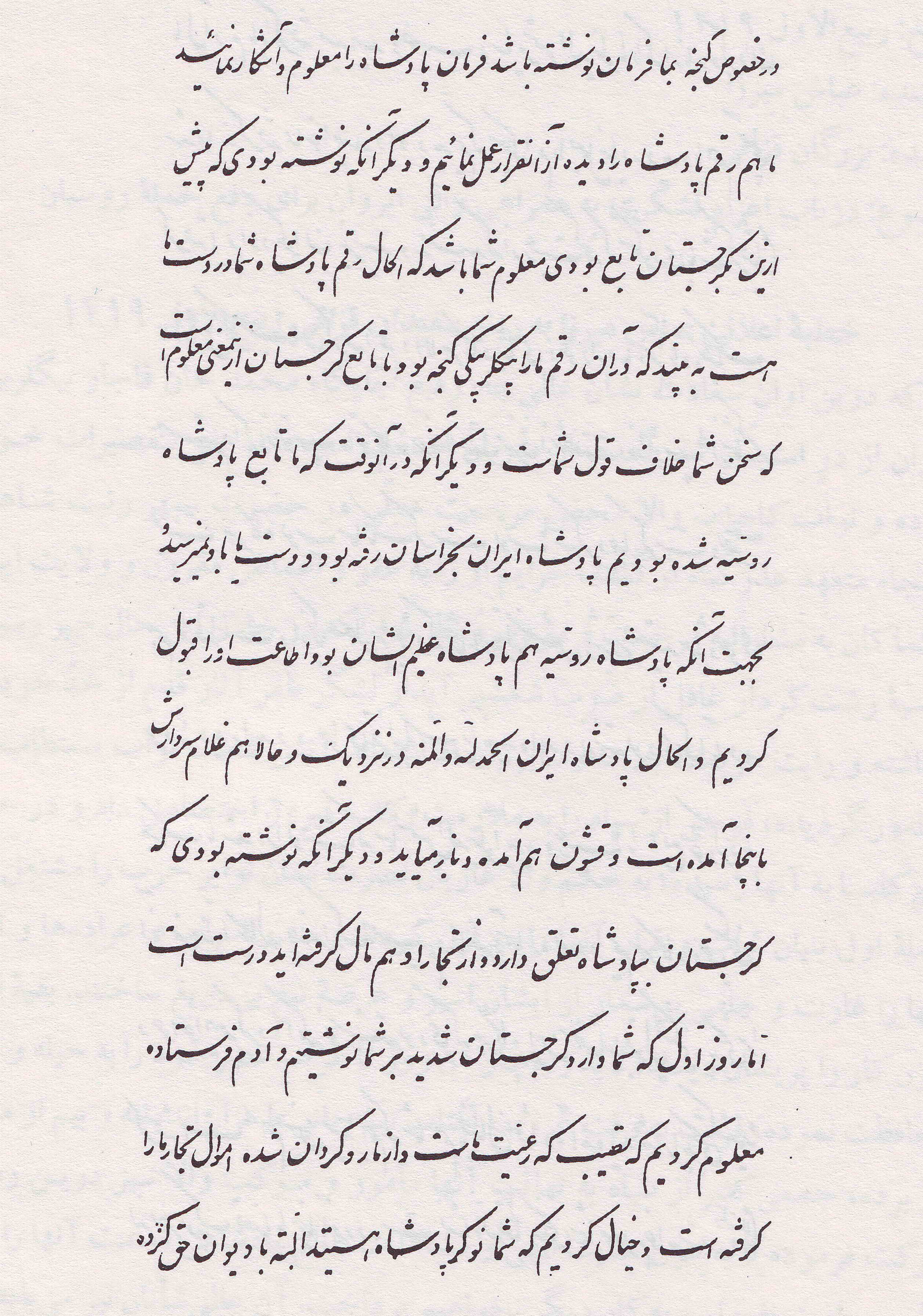
Javad Khan to Tsitsianov page 2

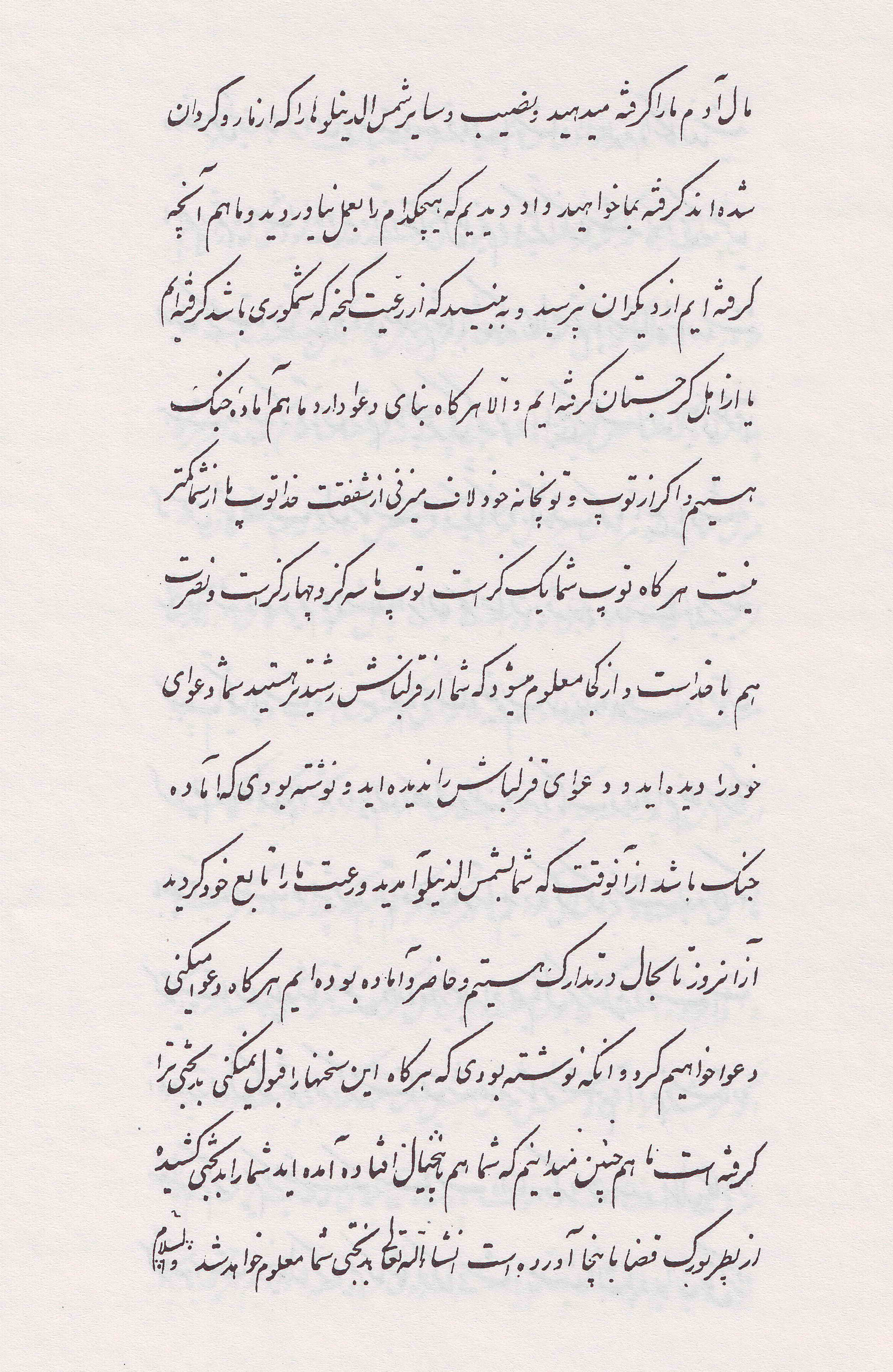
Javad Khan to Tsitsianov page 3

== Death ==
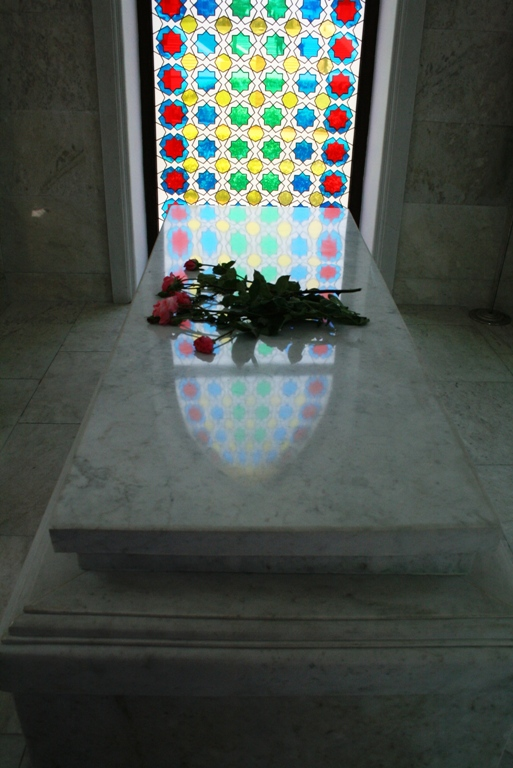
Grave of Javad khan, Ganja, Azerbaijan

On December 13, Tsitsianov crossed the Koshkar river to start the siege preparations. Nasib beg, former sultan of Shamshadil with 200 men and 300 Armenian soldiers immediately deserted and surrendered to the Russians. Heavy artillery bombardment began on December 15 and again requested Javad's surrender. Javad, trying to buy time and hoping for arrival of the Qajar army, received and sent back some letters. Tsitsianov's terms for Javad were to accept Russian citizenship with 20000 rubles of annual tribute, wavering all claims over Shamshadil and send his son Hossein Qoli as hostage to Tiflis. Javad did not accept the terms and on January 14, 1804, Tsitsianov gave the order to attack the fortress. During the fierce fighting that lasted three hours, Armenians residing in the city opened the gates of the castle and, as a result, the Russians headed by major Lisanevich were able to capture the fortress gates. Javad Khan was killed by Lisanevich; his son Hossein Qoli died a few hours later fighting. Javad Khan's two nephews and some other family members were killed during the attack and the city of Ganja was sacked and destroyed by the Russian forces. Some members of his family were able to escape to Tabriz, while others remaining in Ganja fled to Samukh, whose ruler Shirin beg submitted to Tsitsianov. Javad Khan was buried in a tomb located near Juma Mosque. According to Maziar Behrooz, Tsitsianov's conquest of Ganja, which reduced the city to rubble and resulted in the murder of its governor, Javad Khan, his son, and many of the city's defenders and civilian population, was no less brutal and murderous than Qajar ruler Agha Mohammad Khan Qajar's sack of Tiflis in 1795. Between 1,500 and 3,000 inhabitants were killed, including 500 local warriors who had sheltered in a mosque. The conquest of Ganja triggered the Russo-Persian War of 1804–1813.

== Family ==
Javad Khan had two principal wives with whom he had numerous issues:

1. Shukufa khanum (m.1780, d.1812) — a commoner
  - Ughurlu Khan (1781-?) — briefly Khan of Ganja until Battle of Ganja, m. 1801 to Sharaf Jahan begüm, daughter of Mohammad Khan of Ganja
  - Hossein Qoli Khan (1784-1804)
  - Shirin begüm (b.1794) — m. Ahmad Khan the Elder in 1815, son of Jafar Qoli Khan Donboli
2. Malak Nisa begüm (m. 1790, d.1830) — a daughter of Muhammad Husayn Khan Mushtaq
  - Ali Qoli Khan
3. An Armenian concubine
  - Pusta begüm

== Legacy ==
Javad Khan was characterized as a stubborn person by Russian sources. According to Abbasgulu Bakikhanov, "Javad Khan of Ganja was a skillful and knowledge-loving amir yet was a ruthless emir and a dare-devil." Russian general Sergey Tuchkov considered Tsitsianov used excessive bloodshed and Javad khan preferred to die instead of accepting such terms. Tsitsianov in his letter to Ibrahim Khalil Khan wrote that "the pride of Javad Khan caused his death, for which I am not sorry." Spanish military officer Juan Van Halen during his visit to Yelisavetpol talking about Khan, wrote that "my limits will not allow me to relate all that is said of the conduct of this Khan, who exercised unheard-of cruelties on all those who were subject to his authority, and who delighted in making even his wives and children suffer the most excruciating torments for the most trifling fault they committed."

Javad Khan is nowadays a heroic figure in Azerbaijani discourse. According to Jamil Hasanli, the khan "displayed a heroism in battle which fills the glorious early pages of Azerbaijani diplomacy". Samad Seyidov, chairman of the Azerbaijani delegation to Parliamentary Assembly of the Council of Europe (PACE) also considers him as a hero.

According to Armenian author Raffi, "Javad Khan, like his father Shahverdi Khan, loved the Armenians very much. He attended the Armenian church and was present at all Armenian religious festivals and ceremonies." According to George Bournoutian he gave a refuge to Sargis II in 1792.

The khan's court architect was Karbalai Sadykh, the father of the famous Azerbaijani poet Mirza Shafi Vazeh, the court poet was the famous Azerbaijani writer Mohsun Nasiri, the author of "Tuti-name", the Azerbaijani version of the ancient Indian fairy tale.

Javad Khan's descendants in the Russian empire bore the surname Ziyadkhanov. Ismail Khan Ziyadkhanov was a member of the First State Duma of the Russian empire, and later a prominent activist of the Azerbaijan Democratic Republic. Adil Khan Ziyadkhanov was Azerbaijani ambassador to Qajar Iran in 1919-1921. While his Iranian descendants adopted the surname Javadkhani.

There are streets in Baku and Ganja that are named after Javad khan, as well as a peak in Lesser Caucasus.

== In Popular Media ==
Javad Khan is a central character in Sabir Rustamkhanli's Pinnacle of Death (Azerbaijani: Ölüm Zirvəsi) novel. Later, Rovshan Almuradly authored Javad Khan movie in 2009 based on the novel.

== See also ==
- Palace of Ganja Khans

== Sources ==
- Babayev, Elgun (2003). Из истории Гянджинского ханства [From the history of the Ganja Khanate] (PDF) (in Russian). Baku: Nurlan.
- Bournoutian, George (2021). From the Kur to the Aras: A Military History of Russia's Move into the South Caucasus and the First Russo-Iranian War, 1801–1813. Brill. ISBN 978-9004445154.
- Butkov, Pyotr Grigoriyevich (1869). Материалы для новой истории Кавказа, с 1722 по 1803 год, ч. II [Materials of the new history of the Caucasus, from 1722 to 1803. Part II] (in Russian). Tiflis: Enfyandjyants and Co.
- Fisher, William Bayne (1991). The Cambridge History of Iran. Vol. 7. Cambridge University Press. pp. 128–129. "Agha Muhammad Khan remained nine days in the vicinity of Tiflis. His victory proclaimed the restoration of Iranian military power in the region formerly under Safavid domination."

Preceded by Rahim Khan	Khan of Ganja; 1786–1804	Succeeded by Russian conquest
