= Ibrahim Khalil Khan =

Khan of Karabakh
- Reign: 1759 (or 1763) - 1806
- Predecessor: Mehr Ali Beg Javanshir
- Successor: Mehdi Qoli Khan Javanshir
- Born: 1732
- Died: 12 June 1806 (aged 73–74); Shusha, Karabakh Khanate
- Noble family: Javanshir clan

Ibrahim Khalil Khan Javanshir (Persian: ابراهیم‌خلیل‌خان جوانشیر, Azerbaijani: İbrahim Xəlil Xan Cavanşir; 1732–1806) was the second khan of the Karabakh Khanate from the Javanshir family. He was the son and successor of Panah-Ali khan Javanshir.

== Early life ==
He was born in c. 1732 in Karabakh. He was among deportees to Astarabad with his father Panah Ali Khan. He returned to Karabakh after Adil Shah issued a firman (decree) recognizing Panah Ali as the new khan. Participating in internal politics of his father, he was married with Hurizad, daughter of Armenian melik of Varanda - Shahnazar II, as a tool of marriage alliance. Panah Ali further wed him with Shahnisa, sister of Nazarali Khan Shahsevan of Ardabil and Tuti, daughter of Shahverdi Khan of Ganja in 1749. He was given as hostage to Fath-Ali Khan Afshar in 1759, who was defeated by Karim Khan Zand later. He was released by Karim Khan in 1759 and was allowed back to Karabakh.

== Reign ==
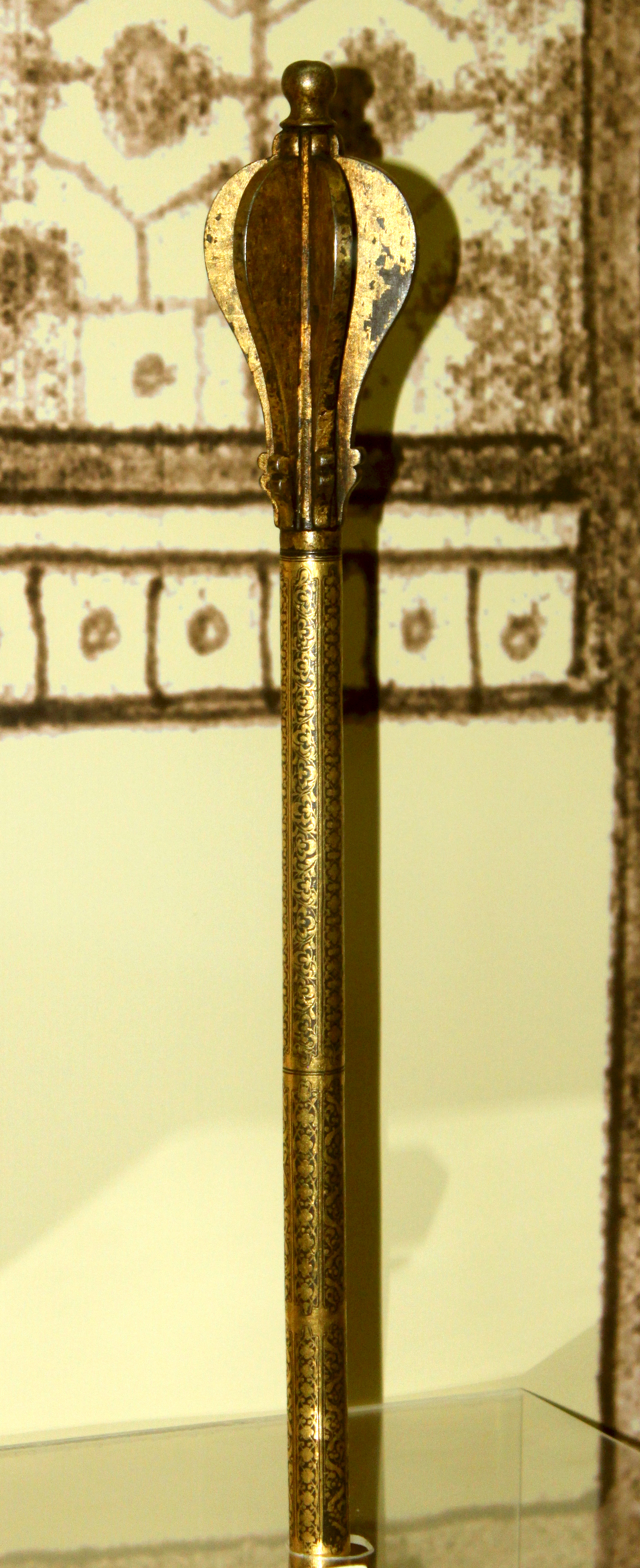
Sceptre of Ibrahim Khalil Khan, Museum of History of Azerbaijan.

He had to contest the khanate with Mehr Ali Beg Javanshir, his younger brother who was left behind by his father Panah Ali Khan prior to his departure to Iran in 1759. Ibrahim Khalil emerged victorious thanks to aid by his new relative Umma Khan of Avar Khanate and forced his brother to flee the region. Later in his reign, Avar and Karabakh khanates coordinated against growing power of Fatali Khan of Quba. Despite their efforts, Shirvan Khanate was invaded by Fatali and Quba's power continued to grow. However, later in 1774, combined forces of Amir Hamza of Qaytaq, Muhammad Husayn Khan Mushtaq of Shaki, Muhammed Khan of Gazikumukh Khanate, Rustam of Tabasaran Principality, Ali Sultan of Dzhengutay and other Dagestan forces clashed with Fatali Khan in Battle of Gavdushan plains near Khudat. This was a heavy blow to Fatali Khan's ambitions, he fled scene wounded.

In the 1780s, Ibrahim Khalil Khan emerged as one of the most powerful rulers in the eastern Caucasus. He aspired to bring most of the Muslim-ruled territory from the Caucasus mountains as far south as Tabriz under his sway, but eventually he had to curb his efforts in the face of the rising Qajar power in Iran. He was then allied with the Georgian king Heraclius II of Kartli-Kakheti and the two interfered in the affairs of the Erivan khanate and made the Ganja Khanate their puppet. Muhammad of Ganja was soon arrested by Ibrahim Khalil together his family. However Fatali Khan invaded Karabakh in 1780 by crossing the Kura River, but then Heraclius II helped Ibrahimkhalil Khan by sending him a detachment under the command of princes George and David. In August of that year the khan of Quba undertook an unsuccessful campaign again, but in the beginning of 1781 he could penetrate deep into Karabakh and to captured some amount of peasants from there. The alliance waned after Heraclius accepted the Russian protectorate in the treaty of Georgievsk in 1783. Ibrahim maintained contact with the Russian authorities, but did not sign any formal treaty.

=== Campaigns against the Melikdoms ===
Like his father, Ibrahim Khalil Khan also campaigned against Armenian meliks of Karabakh starting from 1775. Allying with the meliks of Varanda and Khachen, Ibrahim Khan campaigned against Melik Yesai of Dizak. In one of those battles, Melik Mirzakhan of Khachen was captured by Yesai and beheaded in 1775. However, after a long siege of Togh, Melik Yesai was captured and strangled in prison in summer of 1781. His nephew, Bakhtam was put in his place by the khan. As next step, Ibrahim sent two Armenian assassins, Misael bek and his son-in-law Hagop Yuzbashi, to kill Melik Mezhlum of Jraberd. However, the plot failed and they were captured and executed. Misael's brother Rustam fled the scene and joined Ibrahim Khan's court in Shusha. Being the son-in-law of Apres Agha, his wife Vard Khatun was a relative of Nerses V, who was based in Yerits Mankants Monastery and supported by Javad Khan and Ibrahim Khalil Khan as anti-catholicos. His successor, anti-Catholicos Israel (1728–1763) would also side with Ibrahim Khalil in future.

The Armenian meliks soon wrote a secret letter to Catherine II on 22 January 1783, inviting her to invade Karabakh and if possible and establish an Armenian vassal state in the region. However the plot was uncovered thanks to Allahquli Hasan-Jalalyan, brother of Catholicos Hovhannes (1763–1786), who told Ibrahim Khan about the letters. Catholicos Israel meanwhile seized the letters on their way to Ganja, securing them for Ibrahim Khalil. Using this opportunity, Ibrahim Khan seized Melik Mezhlum of Jraberd, Melik Abov of Gulistan, Melik Bakhtam of Dizak and Catholicos Hovhannes (along with his brothers). Melik Bakhtam was given to Nazarali Khan Shahsevan, with whom he had a grievance, and Dizak was annexed to Karabakh. The rest of the meliks were released for a hefty ransom. Catholicos Hovhannes was killed during his imprisonment, leaving the See of Gandzasar vacant for eight years afterwards.

Melik Abov and Mezhlum, who were imprisoned in the Shusha fortress, later managed to escape. They came to Heraclius II and the head of the Russian garrison in Tbilisi, Colonel Stepan Burnashev, to ask for troops to fight Ibrahim Khan. They were promised a detachment of 4,000 soldiers, which was to be commanded by Prince Demetrius Orbeliani. In September 1787, the troops of Heraclius II and Colonel Burnashev approached Ganja, but at that time the Russian-Turkish war broke out, and Burnashev received an order to immediately return with the troops to the Caucasian line. Heraclius also was forced to turn back. Using opportunity, Ibrahim Khan demanded that Georgia hand over the meliks to him, promising to return three thousand Turkic families who had fled from Borchali to Karabakh in previous years. Heraclius II was inclined to satisfy the demand of Ibrahim Khan in order to keep him from hostile actions. Meliks Abov and Mezhlum, having learned about the demand of Ibrahim Khan, fled from Tbilisi to Ganja to Javad Khan. Javad Khan, who was at enmity with Ibrahim Khan, warmly welcomed them and gave them a place near Shamkhor for the peasants who would come to them from Karabakh. Two other Hasan-Jalalyan brothers, Jalal bek and Daniel bek, were arrested in 1791 and executed as well. Meanwhile, Ibrahim Khan elevated another anti-catholicos, Simeon (1794–1810), and established him in Yerits Mankants Monastery, while also supporting anti-Catholicos Israel in Amaras Monastery.

=== Invasion of Agha Mohammad Khan ===
In 1795 the ruler of Iran, Agha Mohammad Khan Qajar, attacked the region to bring it again within influence of the Iranian empire. The khans of Ganja, Nakhjavan, and Erivan submitted, but Ibrahim Khan did not. He was defeated in battle and retreated to the fortress of Shusha. After a 31 day long siege from July 8 to August 9, Agha Mohammad Khan Qajar failed to take the fortress and left the region. In a verbal truce, Ibrahim Khan acknowledged Qajar supremacy and was permitted to continue to rule as Khan of Karabakh. In 1796, following Agha Mohammad Khan's return to mainland Persia, Catherine the Great ordered her army to conquer the Caucasus. Ibrahim began negotiating with the Russian commanders and agreed to cooperate with them in exchange for maintaining his rule in Karabakh. Soon after Catherine the Great died, her successor, Paul, abandoned her plans for the region and recalled the Russian troops. Using opportunity, Ibrahim and Heraclius teamed up again, this time to invade Ganja Khanate, since its ruler Javad Khan joined Qajar Army in their raid of Tbilisi. During siege of Ganja, Melik Mezhlum was killed by Apres Agha, father of anti-Catholicos Israel.

In 1797, Aga Mohammad Khan, angered by the betrayal of Ibrahim Khalil Khan and other khans in the Caucasus, attacked and captured Shusha. Agha Mohammad Khan was assassinated in Shusha three days after its capture. Molla Panah Vagif, khan's vizier was captured by Muhammad bey, son of Mehr Ali Beg Javanshir and claimant to throne after few days. Ibrahim, who had fled to his in-laws in Avar Khanate, then returned to Shusha and gave Aga Mohammad Khan an honourable burial. In order to retain his position and ensure peaceful relations with the shah, he gave one of his daughters to Agha Mohammad Khan's successor to the throne, Fat′h Ali Shah Qajar.

== End of reign ==
During the Russo-Persian War (1804–1813), General Tsitsianov promised that Russia would recognize Ibrahim Khan as khan and agreed that Ibrahim's elder son would succeed his father, and thus an agreement was signed between Russia and Ibrahim Khan on May 26, 1805. Tsitsianov then occupied Shusha and left a Russian garrison stationed there. Tsitsianov's death on 20 February 1806 in Baku and the breakup of the Russian offensive persuaded Ibrahim Khalil Khan, in the summer of 1806, to repudiate his allegiance to the Russians, and resubmit himself to the shah; he then asked the shah for aid in ousting the Russian garrison. As the Persian army approached Shusha, Ibrahim Khan left the fortress and camped outside. On 12 June 1806, the Russians under the command of Dmitry Lisanevich, instigated by Ibrahim Khalil Khan's grandson and fearful of their own vulnerability, attacked the camp and killed Ibrahim Khan, one of his wives, a daughter, and his youngest son. To gain support from the local Muslims, the Russians appointed a son of Ibrahim Khalil, Mehdi Qoli Khan Javanshir, as khan of Karabakh.

== Family ==
Ibrahim Khalil Khan had several legal wives and temporary wives (slave concubines or mut'ah):

1. Khanum agha Javanshir — daughter of Nabi Kalantar of Jabrayilli clan
  - Mammad Hasan agha Javanshir
2. Tuti khanum Ziyadoghlu-Qajar (b. 1740, m. 1749, d. 1760) — daughter of Shahverdi Khan of Ganja
3. Khurshid begüm Ziyadoghlu-Qajar (b. 1743, m. 1761) — daughter of Shahverdi Khan of Ganja
  - Mehdi Qoli Khan Javanshir
  - Tubi begüm
  - Aghabeyim agha (1782-1831) — married to Fath Ali shah Qajar
4. Bike (Bakhtika) khanum (b. c. 1744) — daughter of Muhammad-nutsal IV, khan of Avars
  - Khanlar agha Javanshir (c. 1785–1832) — Colonel of Imperial Russian Army
  - Ahmad agha Javanshir (c. 1793 or c. 1795-died not later than 1851) — Landed nobility
  - Sultanat begüm (?-12 June 1806) — murdered together his father
5. A daughter of Allahyar bey of Ungutlu tribe
  - Muhammad Qasim agha Javanshir (? - before 1843) — Colonel of Imperial Russian Army
6. Javahir Khanum (née Sofia Abashidze, m. 1783) — daughter of Eugenius Abashidze, granddaughter of Svimon Abashidze
  - Abbasquli agha (c. 1795-12 June 1806) — murdered together his father
  - Govhar agha (1790 - 1888) — married to Jafar Qoli Khan Donboli and later Khankishi bey Javanshir (son of Mehr Ali Beg Javanshir), funded Yukhari Govhar Agha Mosque and Ashaghi Govhar Agha Mosque
7. Shahnisa Khanum — daughter of Badr khan Shahsevan of Ardabil Khanate
  - Bakhshi Khanum — married to Farajulla khan Shahsevan, son of Nazarali Khan Shahsevan
  - Tuti begüm — married to Salim Khan of Shaki Khanate, had an issue
  - Kichik Khanum — married to Mirza Muhammad Khan, beylerbey of Tehran
8. Murassah Khanum — daughter of Gulmali bey Sarijali
  - Shahnisa Khanum — married to her second cousin Ali bey b. Mirza Ali, grandson of Behbud Ali bey (brother of Panah Ali Khan)
9. Tubu Khanum — daughter of Muhammad Husayn Khan Mushtaq of Shaki Khanate
10. Hurizad Khanum — daughter of Melik Shahnazar II of Varanda
11. A daughter of Mirza Rabi, vizier of Heraclius II
  - Azad or İzzet begüm (?-between 1839 and 1847) — married to Abra Khan, second son of Jafar Qoli Khan Donboli
12. Khatay Khanum — daughter of Melik Bakhtam of Dizak
  - Husseinquli agha Javanshir (?-before 1844) — Landed nobility
  - Safiquli agha Javanshir (?-after 1862) — Landed nobility

Temporary wives:

1. Rugan Khanum — an Armenian girl from Nakhichevanik village
  - Abulfat agha Javanshir (1766-1839) — poet, governor of Dizmar
2. Khadija Khanum — an Azerbaijani girl from Bayramlu, Shamshaddil Sultanate
  - Shaykh-Ali agha (?-after 1847) — Landed nobility
3. Sona Khanum (d. after 1844) — an Armenian girl from Togh village
  - Sulayman agha (?-before 1844) — Landed nobility
4. Ana Khanum — daughter of Hajji Kerim from Shusha
  - Fatali agha

== In popular media ==
- Portrayed by Fakhraddin Manafov in Fate of the Sovereign (2008)

== See also ==
- Avshar Turkmen
- Afsharid dynasty
- History of Azerbaijan

== Sources ==
- Bournoutian, George (1997). "Ebrāhīm Khan Ḵalīl Javānšīr". In Yarshater, Ehsan (ed.). Encyclopædia Iranica. Vol. VIII/1: Ebn ʿAyyāš–Economy V. London and New York: Routledge & Kegan Paul. pp. 71–73. ISBN 978-1-56859-050-9.
- Bournoutian, George (2021). From the Kur to the Aras: A Military History of Russia's Move into the South Caucasus and the First Russo-Iranian War, 1801–1813. Brill. ISBN 978-9004445154.
- Davud, Seyyed Ali Al-i (2022). "Ibrāhīm Khalīl Khān Jawānshī". In Fleet, Kate; Krämer, Gudrun; Matringe, Denis; Nawas, John; Rowson, Everett (eds.). Encyclopaedia of Islam (3rd ed.). Brill Online. doi:10.1163/1573-3912_ei3_COM_30552. ISSN 1873-9830.
