= List of rulers of Safavid Georgia =

This is the list of individuals who ruled Safavid Georgia. The territory of the province was principally made up of the two subordinate eastern Georgian kingdoms of Kartli (Persian: کارتیل, romanized: Kartil) and Kakheti (Persian: کاخت, romanized: Kakhet) and, briefly, parts of the Principality of Samtskhe. (Note: Eastern Samtskhe was part of the Safavid Empire from 1551 to 1582, as well as for several years after 1613–1614.) The city of Tiflis (present-day Tbilisi) was its administrative center, the base of Safavid power in the province, and the seat of the rulers of Kartli. It also housed an important Safavid mint. Safavid rule was mainly exercised through the approval or appointment of Georgian royals of the Bagrationi dynasty, at times converts to Shia Islam, as valis or khans. (Note: Before Abbas I's r. (1588–1629), governors of Georgia were usually referred to as hakem. Sometimes they were also styled as soltan (salatin).) The eastern Georgian kingdoms had been subjected in the early 16th century, their rulers did not commonly convert. Tiflis was garrisoned by an Iranian force as early as Ismail I's reign, but relations between the Georgians and Safavids at the time mostly bore features of traditional vassalage. Davud Khan (David XI) was the first Safavid-appointed ruler, whose placement on the throne of Kartli in 1562 marked the start of nearly two and a half centuries of Iranian political dominance over eastern Georgia.

== Safavid valis, khans, and vassals ==
=== of Kartli ===
Tenure	Vali, khan, vassal	Notes
1505–1524	David X	Not known to be conferred with a title (e.g. vali, khan). Subjected by Ismail (r. 1501–1524). Upon Ismail's death in 1524, the Safavid forces were expelled from Kartli.
1534–1562	Luarsab I & Simon I (Mahmud Khan)	Not known to be conferred with a title (e.g. vali, khan). Armed resistance against the Safavids. Kartli (including Tiflis) de facto occupied by the Safavids nevertheless.
1562–1578	Daud Khan	Appointed by Tahmasp I (1524–1576). Also known as Davit XI or David XI.
1578–1599	Shahnavaz Khan	Appointed by Mohammad Khodabanda (1578–1587). Previously imprisoned in the Alamut Castle for nine years. Also known as Svimon I or Simon I.
1599–1606	George X	Not known to be conferred with a title (e.g. vali, khan). De facto under Safavid overlordship. Also known as Giorgi X.
1606–1614	Lohrasb	Appointed by Abbas I (1588–1629). Executed in 1622 in Shiraz. Also known as Luarsab II.
1614–1619	Direct Safavid rule	Tenure of the brothers Ali-Qoli Beg and Emamqoli Beg, as well as Bagrat Khan. When Abbas I (1588–1629) launched his punitive campaigns in Safavid Georgia, he temporarily entrusted Kartli's governorship to Ali-Qoli Beg and his brother Emamqoli Beg. After Ali-Qoli Beg was killed in 1615, Abbas I appointed Bagrat Khan to the post. Raised in Isfahan. Also known as Bagrat VII.
1619–1631	Semayun Khan	Appointed by Abbas I (1588–1629). Raised in Isfahan. Murav-Beg (Giorgi Saakadze) was appointed as his regent (vakil) and vizier when he was in his minority. Murdered by Zurab, Duke of Aragvi. Also known as Svimon II or Simon II.
1633–1658	Rostam Khan	Appointed by Safi (1629–1642). Raised in Isfahan. Held numerous other positions within the Safavid state as well. Buried in Qom. Also known as Rostom, or Rustam Khan.
1658–1676	Shah-Navaz Khan I	Appointed by Abbas II (1642–1666). Buried in Qom. Also known as Vakhtang V.
1676–1688	Shah-Navaz Khan II, Gorgin Khan (1st tenure)	Appointed by Suleiman I (1666–1694). Deposed by Suleiman I as well. Also known as Giorgi XI, or George XI.
1688–1703	Nazar-Ali Khan	Appointed by Suleiman I (1666–1694). Upon his appointment, Abbas Qoli-Khan of neighboring Kakheti was made his supervisor. Removed from position by Suleiman I's successor, Sultan Husayn (1694–1722). Subsequently, made commander of the shah's personal guard, as well as vali of Kakheti (1703–1709). Died in Isfahan. Also known as Erekle I, Heraclius I, or Eregli Khan.
1703–1709	Shah-Navaz Khan II, Gorgin Khan (2nd tenure)	Appointed by Sultan Husayn (1694–1722). Due to his absence, being Safavid governor in Kandahar and commander-in-chief (sepahsalar) of the Safavid armies, his brother Shah-Qoli Khan was briefly made janeshin (regent) of Kartli. Assassinated by rebels while on duty in Kandahar. Also known as Giorgi XI, George XI.
1709–1711	Kaykhosrow	Appointed by Sultan Husayn (1694–1722). Spent the entire period as a Safavid commander-in-chief (sepahsalar), and thus served as vali in absentia. Also held the position of prefect of Isfahan for some time, as well as being the deputy to the divanbegi (chancellor, chief justice). Died on the battlefield. Also known as Kaikhosro.
1711/12–1714	--	Regency (actually since 1703) of the future Hosayn-Qoli Khan (Vakhtang VI).
1714–1716	Ali-Qoli Khan	Appointed by Sultan Husayn (1694–1722). Raised in Isfahan. Held numerous other positions within the Safavid state as well. Also known as Iese or Jesse.
1716–1719	Shah-Navaz, Bakar Mirza	Appointed by Sultan Husayn (1694–1722). Functioned as janeshin on behalf of his father Hosayn-Qoli Khan (Vakhtang VI), who was detained at Isfahan. Held numerous other positions within the Safavid state as well.
1719–1723	Ḥosaynqolī Khan	Appointed by Sultan Husayn (1694–1722). Held numerous other positions within the Safavid state as well. Rebelled in 1722 to join the Russian attack. He was declared deposed by the Safavid government in 1723. Also known as Vakhtang VI.
1723	Mahmad Qoli Khan	Appointed by Tahmasp II (1722–1731). Born and raised in Isfahan. Held numerous other positions in the Safavid state as well. Ordered to take control of Kartli after Hosanyqoli Khan's rebellion. Surrendered to the Ottomans later that same year. Also known as Constantine II.
1723/24–1735	Ottoman rule	Including with Shah-Navaz, Bakar Mirza briefly as vassal in 1723 (new name given by the Ottomans: Ibrahim Pasha), and Ali-Qoli Khan (new name given by the Ottomans: Mustafa Pasha) until 1727. Direct Ottoman rule afterwards.
1735–1736	Direct Safavid rule	Safavid hegemony restored by Nader-Qoli Beg (later known as Nader Shah).

=== of Kakheti ===
Tenure	Vali, khan, vassal	Notes
1476–1511	Alexander I	Not known to be conferred with a title (e.g. vali, khan). Was made a Safavid vassal by Ismail I (1501–1524).
1518/1520–1574	Levan of Kakheti	Not known to be conferred with a title (e.g. vali, khan). Accepted Safavid overlordship both during the reign of Ismail I (1501–1524) as well as Tahmasp I (1524–1576).
1574–1602	Alexander II (1st tenure)	Not known to be conferred with a title (e.g. vali, khan). Repudiated his allegiance to then incumbent king Mohammad Khodabanda, and accepted the Ottoman suzerainty when the latter empire gained the upper hand in 1578.
1602	David I	Not known to be conferred with a title (e.g. vali, khan). Usurped the throne from his father, Alexander II.
1602–1605	Alexander II (2nd tenure)	Not known to be conferred with a title (e.g. vali, khan). De facto under Safavid overlordship. Murdered in 1605 during a Safavid-sponsored coup.
1605	Constantine Khan	Appointed by Abbas I (1588–1629). Raised in Isfahan. Held several other positions as well in the Safavid state. Killed in battle against Georgian rebels. Also known as Constantin(e) Mirza, Konstandil/Kustandil Mirza, and Constantine I.
1605–1614	Tahmuras Khan (1st tenure)	Appointed by Abbas I (1588–1629). Raised in Isfahan. Known for his resistance against the Safavid domination. Also known as Teimuraz I.
1614–1615	Direct Safavid rule	Tenure of Isa Khan. Appointed by Abbas I (1588–1629). Raised in Isfahan. Also known as Iese or Jesse.
1615	Direct Safavid rule	Tenure of Bektash of Kakheti. Appointed by Abbas I (1588–1629). Killed during an uprising.
1616–1625	Direct Safavid rule	Including tenure of Paykar Khan Igirmi Durt. Appointed by Abbas I (1588–1629).
1625–1633	Tahmuras Khan (2nd tenure)	Re-appointed by Abbas I (1588–1629).
1633	Direct Safavid rule	Tahmuras Khan deposed by Rostam of Kartli and Rostam Khan the sepahsalar.
1634–1648	Tahmuras Khan (3rd tenure)	Re-appointed by Safi (1629–1642). Deposed by his overlords in 1648. Died in prison in Astarabad.
1648–1664	Direct Safavid rule	Including tenure of Morteza Qoli Khan. The Bakhtrioni uprising commenced during this period in 1659.
1664–1675	Shah-Nazar Khan	Appointed by Abbas II (1642–1666). Also known as Archil.
1675–1703	Direct Safavid rule	Including tenures of Abbas Qoli-Khan and Qalb-ʿAlī Khan.
1703–1709	Nazar Ali Khan	Appointed by Sultan Husayn (1694–1722). Due to him being kept at Isfahan, where he also served as commander of the king's personal guard, the actual administration in Kakheti was headed by his son Imam Quli Khan. He died in Isfahan, and was also known as Irakli I, Heraclius I, or Eregli Khan.
1709–1722	Imam Quli Khan	Appointed by Sultan Husayn (1694–1722). Born and raised in Isfahan. In 1709–1715, due to Emamqoli Khan's absence being at the court in Isfahan, his younger brother Teimuraz II and the latter's mother took care of the administration. He was buried in Qom. Also known as Davit II, or David II.
1722–1723	Mahmad Qoli Khan	Appointed by Sultan Husayn (1694–1722). Born and raised in Isfahan. Held numerous other positions in the Safavid state as well. Killed in 1732 by the Ottomans at the time of Nader Qoli Beg's (Nader Shah) reestablishment of Safavid power in the region. Also known as Constantine II.
1724–1735	Ottoman rule	Mahmad Qoli Khan rebelled for a long period of time, but by 1730, he was forced to recognize the Ottoman supremacy, and agreed to pay tribute.
1735–1736	Direct Safavid rule	Safavid hegemony restored by Nader-Qoli Beg (later known as Nader Shah).

=== of (eastern) Samtskhe–Meskheti ===
Tenure	Vali, khan, vassal	Notes
1551-1573	Kaikhosro II Jaqeli	Due to persistent Ottoman encroachment, he was forced to settle at the Safavid court in 1570.
?–1579	Manuchehr ibn Grigori	The main fort, Akhesqeh, and the surrounding lands were his hereditary grounds.
1579–1622	Ottoman rule	It was during this period that Manuchar II Jaqeli fled to the Safavid court. His son, Manuchar III Jaqeli, was appointed as ruler of Samtskhe–Meskheti by Abbas I in 1607.
1623–1639	Direct Safavid rule	Tenures of Salim Khan Shams al-Dinlu, Shamshi Khan Qazaqlar (aka Shams al-Din Qazaqlar), Salim Khan Shams al-Dinlu Dhu'l-Qadr, and Emamqoli Beg.
1639 onwards	Ottoman rule	The Ottomans were given the Safavid (i.e. "eastern") part of Samtskhe–Meskheti according to the Treaty of Zuhab. All of Samtskhe–Meskheti remained thenceforth in Ottoman hands.

== Sources ==
- Floor, Willem (2001). Safavid Government Institutions. Costa Mesa, California: Mazda Publishers. ISBN 978-1568591353.
- Floor, Willem M. (2008). Titles and Emoluments in Safavid Iran: A Third Manual of Safavid Administration, by Mirza Naqi Nasiri. Washington, D.C.: Mage Publishers. pp. 1–324. ISBN 978-1933823232.
- Rayfield, Donald (2012). Edge of Empires: A History of Georgia. Reaktion Books. ISBN 978-1780230702.
