= Russo-Persian War (1826–1828) =

Fifth and final conflict of the Russo-Persian Wars

- Part of the Russo-Persian Wars
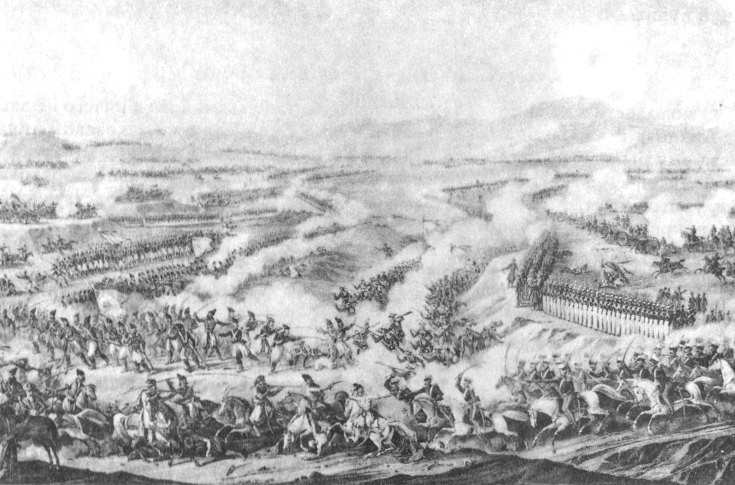
- Contemporary illustration of the Battle of Ganja
Date	8 July 1826 – 2 February 1828
Location	South Caucasus, Azerbaijan province
Result	Russian victory Treaty of Turkmenchay
Territorial changes	Iran cedes its Erivan and Nakhichevan provinces (Note: Roughly corresponding to present-day Armenia, the Nakhchivan Autonomous Republic in the Republic of Azerbaijan and the Turkish Iğdır Province.) to Russia

Belligerents
Russian Empire	Qajar Iran

Commanders and leaders
(Russian Empire) Nicholas I (Russian Empire) Aleksey Yermolov (Russian Empire) Valerian Madatov (Russian Empire) Ivan Paskevich (Russian Empire) Iosif Reutt	Fath Ali Shah; Abbas Mirza; Hossein Sardar; Hasan Khan Sari Aslan (POW); Amir Khan Devellu-Qajar †; Asef al-Dowleh (surrendered); Hamzeh Khan Anzali (POW); Mahmud Khan Maqsudilu (POW)

Casualties and losses
3,967 casualties	Unknown

The Russo-Persian War of 1826–1828 (Note: Also called the Russo-Iranian War of 1826–1828.) was the last major military conflict between the Russian Empire and Qajar Iran, which was fought over territorial disputes in the South Caucasus region.

Initiated by Russian expansionist aims and intensified by Iranian resistance, the war witnessed significant military engagements, including the Battle of Ganja and Capture of Erivan. The Iranians were initially successful, catching the Russian forces of Yermolov off-guard. They were aided by local uprisings against Russian garrisons in Talish, Ganja, Shirvan, Shakki, and other areas. However Russian reinforcements under the newly appointed General Ivan Paskevich turned the war decisively in Russia's favor, capturing the important city of Tabriz in northwestern Iran.

The war concluded with the Treaty of Turkmenchay in 1828, which stripped Iran of its last remaining territories north of Aras river in the Caucasus, which comprised all of modern Armenia, the Nakhchivan Autonomous Republic in the Republic of Azerbaijan and the Iğdır Province in Turkey. The treaty also allowed Russia a say in Iranian politics, as the Iranian shah (king) now required Russia's acknowledgment of the person he wanted to name as heir apparent.

Iran was potentially saved from further loss and submission, possibly even from losing all of Iranian Azerbaijan or even becoming a Russian vassal, either due to the persistence of the Iranian negotiators with the help of the British or the Russians' desire to quickly make peace since another war with the Ottomans was likely nearing. After the war, the Qajar state would never again face Russia on an equal footing or be treated as an equal by European countries.

== Background ==
Fath-Ali Shah Qajar (r. 1797–1834), the second shah (king) of Iran's newly found Qajar dynasty, was embroiled in a conflict with Russia over the Caucasus as soon as he came to power in 1797. After many years of being subject to Iranian rule, the Christian Kingdom of Kartli-Kakheti (located in Eastern Georgia) decided to reject their rule. It made the decision to look to Russia for defense against Iran after rejecting rule by the Qajars. Since the previous shah Agha Mohammad Khan Qajar (r. 1789–1797) had been slain in the Caucasus during a military campaign, this was an important matter for the Qajar dynasty.

The reign of the Russian tsar (emperor) Alexander I (r. 1801–1825) saw an increased desire on the part of the Russians to increase their presence and influence in the Caucasus, where they had already shown interest since the 1760s. Any infringement of Iran's control over the Caucasus was not something that the Qajar administration could just ignore. Since 1502, Iran had controlled the Caucasus and the Iranians saw it as a natural extension of their country. The war of 1804–1813 soon erupted between the two countries as result of the Russian invasion of the Iranian city Ganja and massacre of its residents.

The Iranians ended up losing the war and were forced to sign the Treaty of Gulistan. Per the terms of the treaty, Iran conceded to Russia the sultanates of Shamshadil, Qazzaq, Shuragol, and the khanates of Baku, Derbent, Ganja, Shakki, Quba, Shirvan, Karabakh, and the northern and central part of Talish. Moreover, Iran also had to abandon its claims over Georgia.

The treaty's territorial arrangements were unclear, for example, in Talish, where it was left up to the mutually appointed administrators to "determine what mountains, rivers, lakes, villages, and fields shall mark the line of frontier." If one of the participants to the treaty felt that the other party had "infringed on" territorial possessions claimed in accordance with the status quo principle, even the limits laid forth in the treaty could be changed. This essentially ensured that territorial conflicts would persist after the treaty's authorization. The region between Lake Gokcha and the city of Erivan remained one of the most disputable.

== Prelude ==
Map of the Iranian-ruled Erivan Khanate, showing Lake Gokcha to the east and Bash Aparan to the north

In early 1825, the northern bank of Lake Gokcha, which the Iranians believed to be a part of their realm, was seized by the Russians under the orders of Aleksey Petrovich Yermolov, the governor of Georgia. The Russian army soon advanced further, capturing Balagh-lu as well. The Iranians knew that these locations might be used as a staging ground for an attack on Erivan, therefore the significance of this went far beyond the sites themselves. Although Yermolov conceded that this was Iranian territory, he defended his action by claiming that Iran was clinging to a large portion of Karabakh. The Russians also constructed a small fort on the frontier with Erivan, which the Qajar crown prince Abbas Mirza protested against.

In the middle of 1825, the fort was attacked by the troops of the Iranian governor of the Erivan Khanate, Hossein Khan Sardar. In 1826, reports of Alexander I's sudden death in late 1825 made it to Iran, but the stories that made it there exaggerated the chaos surrounding the handover of power. As a result, in December 1825, a group of young men, primarily military officers, staged the Decembrist Revolt in an attempt to force political concessions by obstructing Alexander's second younger brother Nicholas from succeeding to the throne. The rebellion was promptly put down by troops who supported Nicholas. On 8 July, the Russians captured the town of Bash Aparan in the northern Erivan Khanate, deep within Iranian territory. The Iranian American historian Maziar Behrooz considers that the start of the war of 1826–1828. In Fath-Ali Shah's court, two factions had developed during the course of building policy toward Russia. One faction advocated for peace with Russia, and the other for war. Both were heavily lobbying Fath-Ali Shah and Abbas Mirza. The first question at hand was what to do if Russia did not stop their occupation of Gokcha and Balagh-lu. The state of the Muslim minority under Russian authority and, lastly, whether and to what extent Russia had been weakened as a result of its internal crises, were secondary concerns.

Those who advocated for peace were the foreign minister Mirza Abolhassan Khan Ilchi; the chief scribe Neshat Esfahani; the head of the royal office Manuchehr Khan Gorji; and the court translator and envoy Mirza Saleh Shirazi. In general, the peace party feared the capability of the Russian Empire and wanted armed conflict to be avoided at all costs. They were more accustomed to dealing with people from other cultures and knew more about Russia.

Those who advocated for war were several prominent Islamic scholars led by Agha Sayyed Mohammad Esfahani; Fath-Ali Shah's new chief minister Asef al-Dowleh; Abbas Mirza's close advisor Abol-Qasem Qa'em-Maqam II; and some of the exiled khans of the Caucasus, who had either been driven away by the Treaty of Gulistan or had fled to Iran after the treaty. The main stance of the war party was that the Russians had clearly insulted the Iranians and been aggressive towards them. Agha Sayyed Mohammad, who was on his way to meet Fath-Ali Shah, mentioned Fath-Ali Shah's responsibilities "both as Sovereign of Persia, and as the head of the Mohamedian faith" in a letter to Fath-Ali Shah. Agha Sayyed Mohammad also brought up the Russian annexation of Iranian territory and the treatment of Muslims. Furthermore, the war party's interpretation of Russian events was more optimistic than realistic, arguing that Russia was weak overall, especially in the Caucasus due to Yermolov's recent defeats and the Decembrist revolt.

To advise Fath-Ali Shah and formulate a course of action in this matter, the Council of Soltaniyeh gathered. The peace party at Fath-Ali Shah's court was ultimately outmanoeuvred and the final decision was to launch full-scale warfare against the Russians.

== The war ==
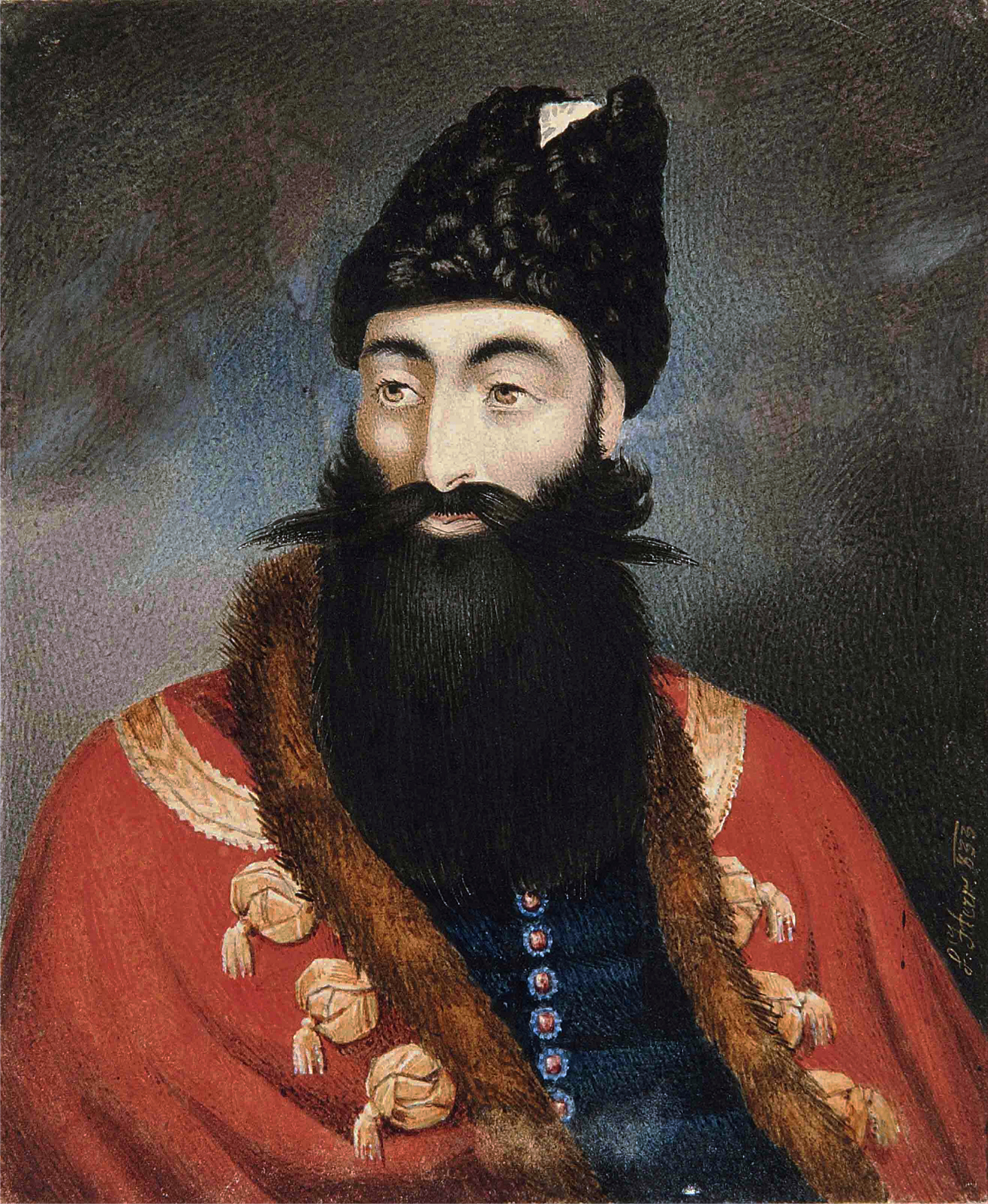
Portrait of the Iranian crown prince Abbas Mirza, who commanded the Iranian forces

Despite Abbas Mirza's soldiers appearing to be unprepared for a large fight, Iran's entry into the war in the summer of 1826 started out successfully. This was due to two factors. Yermolov was initially embroiled in a struggle in Chechnya despite advocating for war; as a result, his men were unprepared for the war and were incapable to meet the approaching challenge. Second, with the support of their previous khans, the Muslim populace rose against Russians, as they had grown tired of being oppressed. In Shirvan, Ganja, Talish, Shakki and Karabakh (aside from Shusha), the stationed Russian troops were either driven out by the rebels or Iranian forces, or withdrew themselves. It is uncertain if rebellions occurred or were suppressed in Quba, Baku, Derbent and Georgia.

On 25 and 26 July, Russian and Iranian forces started to engage each other at Talish. Between 28 and 30 July, the Russian army fought an intense battle against Sardar, who conquered Pambak and Shuregol in northern Erivan. Meanwhile, his brother Hasan Khan Sari Aslan made attacks further north, forcing the Russians to withdraw to Tiflis. Between 1 and 3 August, Bash Aparan was recovered by Sardar, who then started fighting the Russians at Gyumri. On 12 August, Lankaran and Saliyan were conquered by the Iranian forces. During this period, a Russian battalion of 800 soldiers were ambushed and defeated by a force of 35,000 soldiers led by Abbas Mirza. Fath-Ali Shah's camp at Ardabil received 400 heads, while Tabriz received 400 POWs (including the commander and 17 officers as well as two cannons).

While some of his troops were still fighting the Russians in Talish, Abbas Mirza besieged Shusha on 6 August. According to Behrooz, "At this point, a number of blunders spelled catastrophe and defeat." Abbas Mirza rejected the proposal by his maternal uncle Amir Khan Devellu-Qajar to attack Shusha's fortress, as he knew it would be a prolonged siege. Instead, he entrusted Amir Khan with the care of his eldest son, Mohammad Mirza (later known as Mohammad Shah Qajar), and ordered him to take control of Ganja. Colonel Iosif Reutt, the Russian commander of Shusha, disarmed the Muslims residing there, and then mounted an effective defense with the aid of the local Armenians. The siege of Shusha dragged on for a long time because Abbas Mirza's artillery was unable to break through. Iosif started negotiating with Abbas Mirza to buy himself some time while he waited for Russian reinforcements.

In a letter to Abbas Mirza, Amir Khan demanded additional cannons and five or six Nezam-e Jadid regiments in order to battle the Russian reinforcements led by Lieutenant General Valerian Madatov. He was given explicit instructions by Abbas Mirza to collect the Russian weaponry and equipment that had been seized and to wait within the Ganja castle until he was done with Shusha. But when Amir Khan learned of the impending Russian army led by Madatov (10,000 Cossacks, twelve infantry battalions, and twelve artillery pieces) he organized a 5,000-man cavalry force and, with Mohammad Mirza at his side, marched towards Shamkor. This led to the Battle of Shamkor on 16 September, where Madatov defeated the forces of Amir Khan, who was killed. Mohammad Mirza withdrew to Ganja, which was shortly afterwards abandoned by its defenders, who withdrew to Shusha.

On 17 September, Ganja surrendered to Madatov without any opposition. With reinforcements, General Ivan Paskevich arrived in the Caucasus on 22 September and assumed command of the Russian forces on 29 September, thus replacing Yermolov. A member of the Cossack elite from Ukraine, Paskevich embodied the goals of Russian imperialism. He had already proven himself effective throughout the Napoleonic Wars and against the Ottoman Empire in 1814.

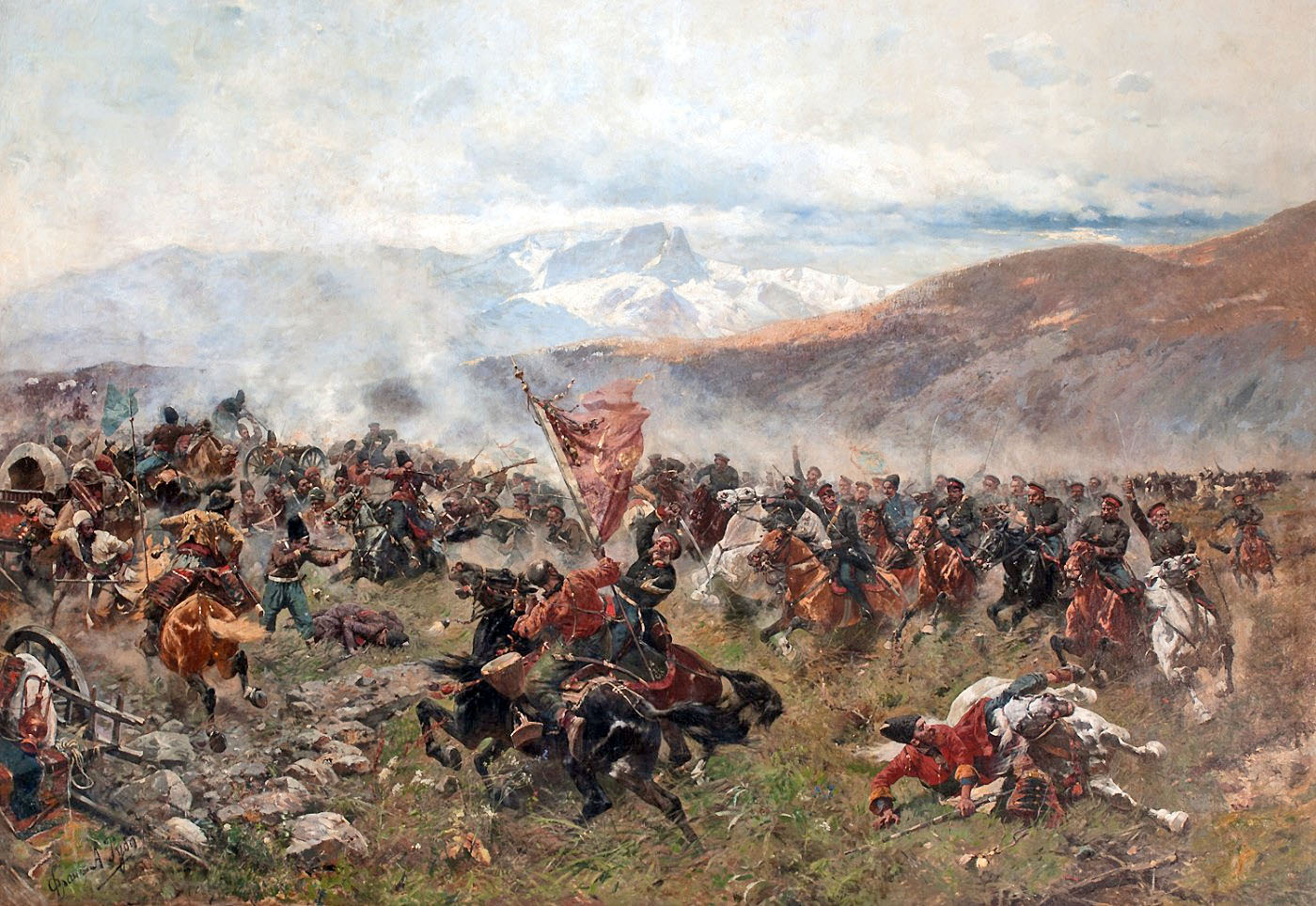
Painting of the Battle of Ganja, made by Franz Roubaud in 1887

The same day, Abbas Mirza marched towards Ganja, leaving a small force to carry on Shusha's siege. On 13–17 October, the Battle of Ganja took place, close to the tomb of the famous Persian poet Nizami Ganjavi, who lived in the 12th-century. As was customary, Abbas Mirza assigned three of his sons to accompany various units within his 30,000-man army. Mohammad Mirza was in charge of one unit, while the two underage sons Jahangir Mirza and Khosrow Mirza were in two other units, being escorted by their tutors. But fearing for their safety in the midst of battle, Abbas Mirza gave the tutors the order to evacuate Jahangir Mirza and Khosrow Mirza. As a result of this maneuver, the center of his army fell apart, leading to his defeat. From this point on, loss was imminent for the Iranians as this was the war's most important fight. A witness to the Battle of Ganja noted the following; "The action was at first well contested; and had Abbas Mirza possessed the talent of a commander, the Russian power in Georgia would have been at an end."

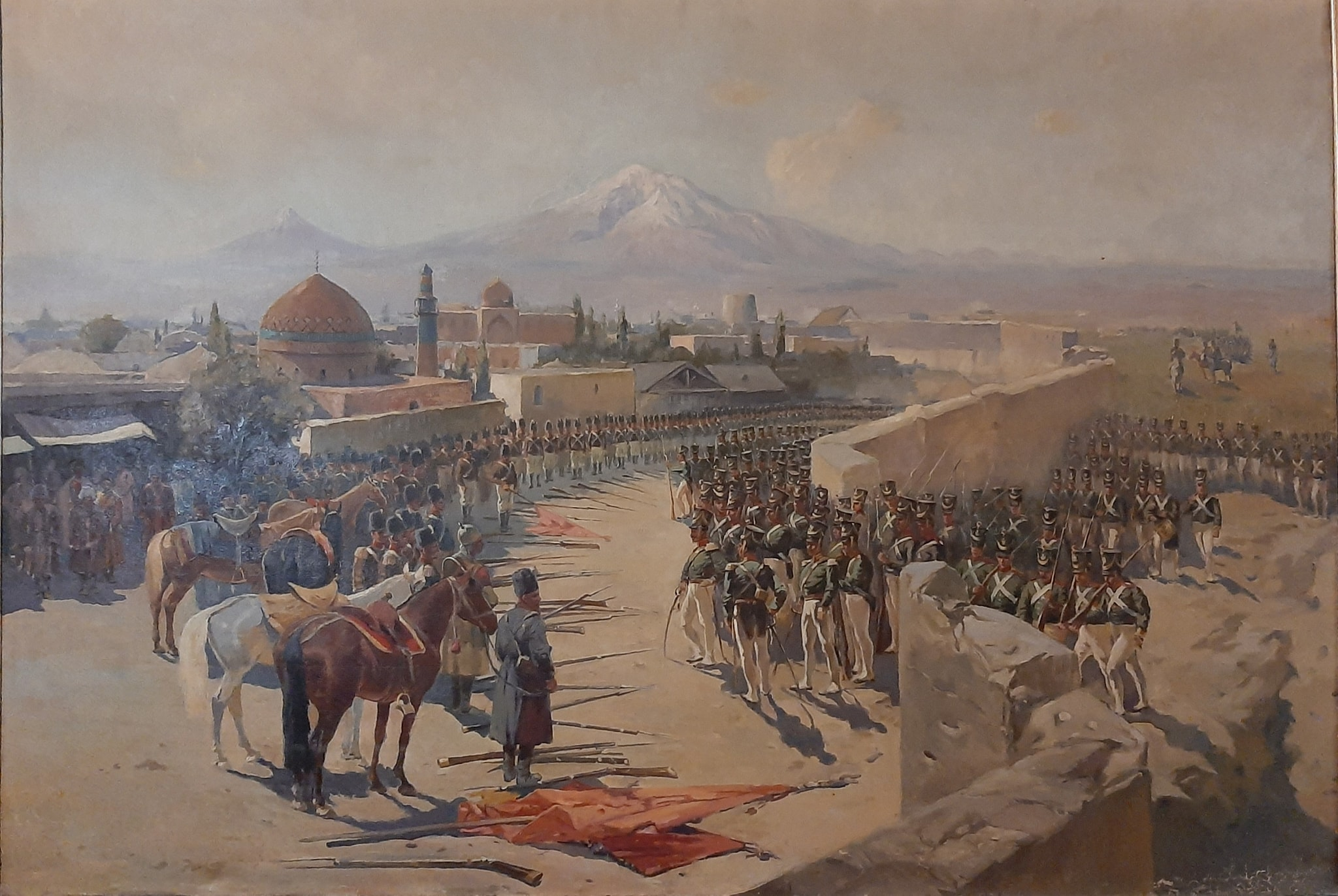
Painting of the Capture of Erivan, made by Franz Roubaud in 1893

By 1827, Abbas Mirza was losing the war and he had to shift from attacking to defending. A fourteen-day raid south of the River Aras was carried out by Madatov in January. Etchmiadzin surrendered in April, while Abbasabad and Ordubad, two fortresses in Nakhichevan, came under siege in July. On 7 July, Paskevich defeated Abbas Mirza, who had come to aid them, and both fortresses gave up. September saw the surrender of the strongly fortified citadel of Erivan following a siege and intense bombardment, as well as the fortress of Sardarabad. Using eight 24-pounder heavy guns and four 4-inch mortars, Paskevich destroyed the stronghold walls of Erivan. Sardar escaped Erivan before it was taken, but other commanders including Hasan Khan Sari Aslan, Hamzeh Khan Anzali and Mahmud Khan Maqsudilu, were taken prisoner and moved to Tiflis.

Despite having a 20,000-man army under the command of Asef al-Dowleh, Tabriz (the most rich and populous city in Iran) surrendered without a fight on 24 October 1827. The city was given to Paskevich by an Islamic scholar. Following the Russian evacuation of Tabriz, Fath-Ali Shah ordered his execution, and while Abbas Mirza and Fath-Ali Shah watched, Asef al-Dowleh would be publicly whipped for his timidity. On 25 January 1828, the Russians captured and plundered Ardabil, seizing its jewelry that dated back to the Safavid era.

== Aftermath ==
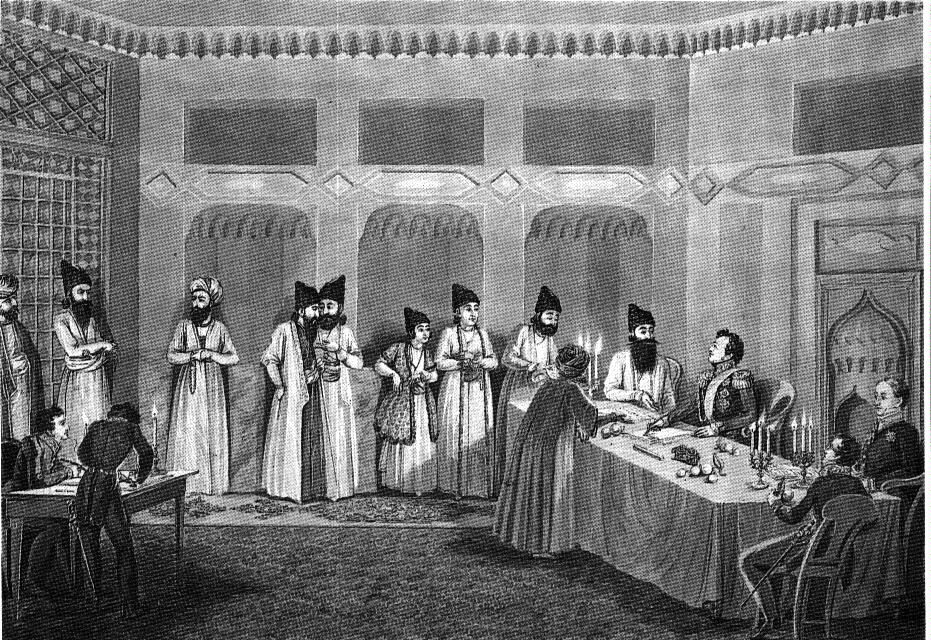
Signing ceremony of the Treaty of Turkmenchay

On 2 February 1828, Abbas Mirza signed the Treaty of Turkmenchay, thus ceding Erivan and Nakhichevan as well as agreeing to significant war reparations and other concessions. The province of Azerbaijan and Abbas Mirza's personal fortune provided the majority of the money needed to pay for this; a minor portion came from the British, but none from the shah. Russia was able to put pressure on Iran because of the reparations obligation. The treaty also gave Russia an opportunity to get involved in Iranian politics, as the shah now required Russia's acknowledgment of the person he wanted to name as heir apparent.

Iran was potentially saved from further loss and submission, possibly even from losing all of Azerbaijan or even becoming a Russian vassal, either due to the persistence of the Iranian negotiators with the help of the British or the Russians' desire to quickly make peace since another war with the Ottomans was likely nearing. After the war, the Qajar state would never again face Russia on an equal footing or be treated as an equal by European countries. The Iranian defeat changed the outlook of Abol-Qasem Qa'em-Maqam on the Russians, as demonstrated in one of his poems, where he regrets the change of Iran's fortune. He had now acknowledged that it was no longer the Iranians who were the superior force but the Russians.

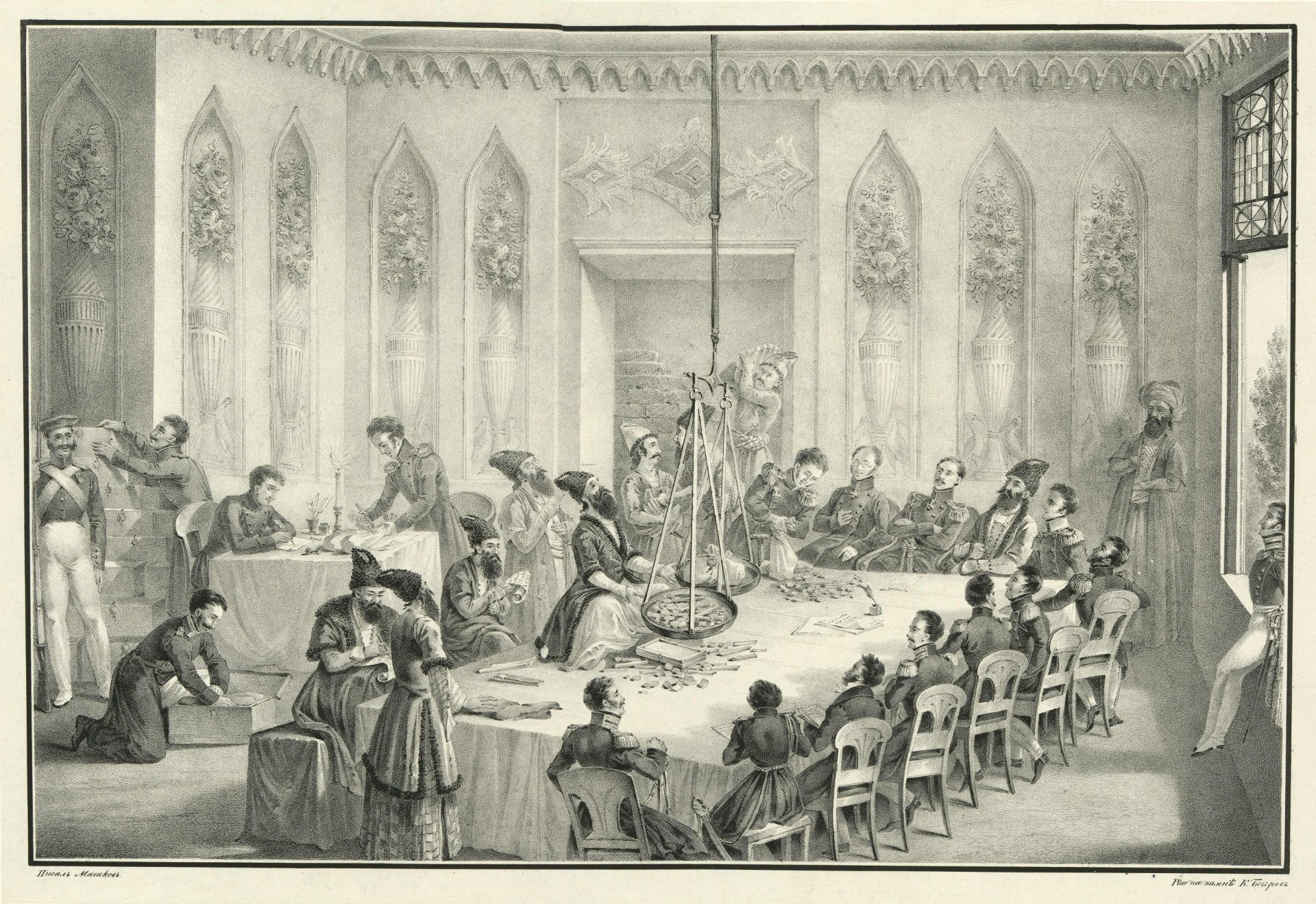
Iranian officials paying the Russians the first installment of their war reparations in gold. Before being shipped, Russian officers weigh it on a large scale that hangs from the ceiling.

In 1829, the distinguished Russian poet and author Alexander Griboyedov led a sizable Russian embassy to the capital Tehran to enforce the conditions of the Treaty of Turkmenchay. He ordered that the Georgian concubines who were held in the harems of the Qajars (including Asef al-Dowleh's) be released into his care. He had done this at the urging of an Armenian eunuch who was himself a prisoner from earlier Iranian expeditions into the Caucasus. Griboyedov dispatched his Armenian and Georgian assistants to deliver the Georgian concubines to the Russian embassy, relying on a clause in the Treaty of Turkmenchay that called for the trading of prisoners of war.

Such a transgression of the law and Shia religious practices was viewed as having significant symbolic significance. Asef al-Dowleh asked for the help of the local Islamic scholar Mirza Masih Tehrani, who as a result urged the citizens of the capital to rise up, rescue the concubines, who had probably now converted to Islam, and bring them back to their Muslim homes. Three protesters lost their lives in the ensuing fights with the Russian security forces. Mirza Masih Tehrani then issued a fatwa, which led to the slaughter of Griboyedov and all but one of the seventy-person personnel of the Russian embassy by an enraged crowd.

Behrooz states that "In this context, the nervous Iranian reaction was telling and shows how much attitudes toward Russia had changed in Iran." One contemporary Iranian historian states that; "When Crown Prince Abbas Mirza heard of the occurrence, he ordered all the soldiers and the nobles to put on black dress as a sign of mourning, all the bazaars to be closed for three days, and all the people to stop working." To apologize, Fath-Ali Shah dispatched a diplomatic team to Nicholas I. Khosrow Mirza commanded the high-ranking team that reached Saint Petersburg in 1829.

== Sources ==
- Aktin, Muriel (2018). "The Early Stages of Russo–Iranian Relations". In Matthee, Rudi; Andreeva, Elena (eds.). Russians in Iran: Diplomacy and Power in the Qajar Era and Beyond. I.B. Tauris. pp. 11–23. ISBN 978-1-78673-336-8.
- Amanat, Abbas (2017). Iran: A Modern History. Yale University Press. ISBN 978-0300112542.
- Behrooz, Maziar (2023). Iran at War: Interactions with the Modern World and the Struggle with Imperial Russia. I.B. Tauris. ISBN 978-0755637379.
- Bournoutian, George (1992). The Khanate of Erevan Under Qajar Rule: 1795–1828. Mazda Publishers. ISBN 978-0939214181.
- Bournoutian, George (2016). "Prelude to War: The Russian Siege and Storming of the Fortress of Ganjeh, 1803–4". Iranian Studies. 50 (1). Taylor & Francis: 107–124.
- Bournoutian, George (2021). From the Kur to the Aras: A Military History of Russia's Move into the South Caucasus and the First Russo-Iranian War, 1801–1813. Brill. ISBN 978-9004445154.
- Cronin, Stephanie, ed. (2013). Iranian-Russian Encounters: Empires and Revolutions since 1800. Routledge. ISBN 978-0415624336.
- Daniel, Elton L. (2001). "Golestān Treaty". In Yarshater, Ehsan (ed.). Encyclopædia Iranica. Vol. XI/1: Giōni–Golšani. London and New York: Routledge & Kegan Paul. pp. 86–90. ISBN 978-0-933273-60-3.
- Kashani-Sabet, Firoozeh (2014). Frontier Fictions: Shaping the Iranian Nation, 1804–1946. Princeton University Press. ISBN 978-1850432708.
- Hambly, Gavin R. G. (1991). "Iran during the reigns of Fath 'Alī Shāh and Muhammad Shāh". In Avery, Peter; Hambly, Gavin R. G.; Melville, Charles Peter (eds.). The Cambridge History of Iran: From Nadir Shah to the Islamic Republic. Vol. 7. Cambridge: Cambridge University Press. pp. 144–173. ISBN 0-521-20095-4.
- Pourjavady, Reza (2023). "Russo-Iranian wars 1804-13 and 1826-8". Christian-Muslim Relations. A Bibliographical History Volume 20. Iran, Afghanistan and the Caucasus (1800–1914). Brill.
- Tapper, Richard (1997). Frontier Nomads of Iran: A Political and Social History of the Shahsevan. Cambridge University Press. ISBN 978-0-52158-336-7.
- Gisetti, Anton L. (1901). "Потери в период войн с Турцией и Персией" [Losses during the Wars with Turkey and Persia]. In Potto, Vasily A. (ed.). Сборник сведений о потерях Кавказских войск во время войн Кавказско-горской, персидских, турецких и в Закаспийском крае [Collection of information about the losses of the Caucasian troops during the wars with the Highlanders, Persians and Turks and in the Transcaspian region] (in Russian). Составлен по документам, хранящимся в Кавказских архивах (Compiled according to documents kept in the Caucasian Archives). Tiflis (modern Tbilisi): Типография Либермана.
