= Mustafa agha Arif =

Last sultan of the Kazakh Sultanate (born 1774)

Sultan of the Kazakh sultanate
- Tenure: 1795 - 1801
- Predecessor: Ahmad agha Qazaq
- Successor: Title abolished
- Born: 1774; İkinci Şıxlı, Kazakh sultanate
- Died: before 1842 (estimated); Russian Empire (exact location disputed; Kazan, Kharkov, or Kursk cited in sources)
- Buried: Unknown
- Family: Shikhlinski
- Spouse: Aisha Khanum
- Father: Ahmad agha Qazaq
- Occupation: Military commander; district administrator; poet
- Military career
- Allegiance: Russian Empire
- Rank: Major
- Unit: Kazakh Irregular Cavalry
- Commands: Kazakh District
- Conflicts: Russo-Persian War (1804–1813); Siege of Erivan (1804); Battle of the Akstafa Gorge (1805); Raid on Akhaltsikhe (1808); Battle of Gokcha (1810)
- Awards: Gold Medal «За храбрость» (For Bravery); Silver Medal (1810)

Mustafa-agha Shikhlinski (Azerbaijani: Mustafa ağa Şıxlinski; 1774 – before 1842), known by the pen name Arif (Azerbaijani: Arif, "The Knowing"), was the last hereditary sovereign of the Kazakh Sultanate, a Major in the Imperial Russian Army, and an Azerbaijani poet. In Russian imperial records he appears variously as Mustafa-agha Kazakhskiy (Мустафа-ага Казахскій, "of Kazakh") and later Mustafa-bek Shikhilinskiy, reflecting the gradual standardisation of his family's title into the Russian noble hierarchy.

A member of the Shikhlinski noble family, Mustafa-agha served the Russian Empire as a military commander and intelligence asset from 1800 onwards, winning distinction in combat during the Russo-Persian War (1804–1813). Despite receiving medals and promotion to Major, he was perceived by the Russian administration as a representative of an older, semi-autonomous feudal order incompatible with the centralising programme of General Aleksey Yermolov. In 1819 he was arrested in Elisabethpol and exiled to the Russian interior, never returning to the Caucasus. In exile he composed poetry of displacement and political grief under the pseudonym Arif, becoming a minor but distinctive voice in nineteenth-century Azerbaijani literature. His burial place is unknown.

== Background and ancestry ==
The Shikhlinski family claimed hereditary authority in the Kazakh district stretching back more than five hundred years. In petitions submitted to the Russian throne after the annexation of Georgia in 1801, the Kazakh leadership explicitly claimed more than 500 year long inheritance. (Note: General Aliagha Shikhlinski (1863–1943), the family's most prominent later descendant, states in his memoirs that the Shikhlinski lineage traces to a specific ancestor, Agdolag Mamed Agha, who arrived in the Kazakh district from Shamkir in 1537. Agdolag Mamed Agha had two sons: the elder, Shikhi, whose descendants later settled in the three villages collectively named Shikhli near Tiflis and adopted the surname Shikhizadeh; and the younger, Ali Kazakh, the martial branch from whom Ali Aga Shikhlinski descended and who retained the old location. After the Russian annexation both lines adopted the shared surname Shikhlinski.) His father Ahmad Sultan Kazakh (died 1795) was hereditary lord of Kazakh. His family and close circle resided in Karabakh Khanate from the summer of 1787 until at least 1795. They returned to the region after Agha Muhammad Shah Qajar's devastating invasion of Georgia. Mustafa as the eldest son of his father, became sultan in 1795.

Mustafa-agha had several brothers who participated in the district's administration. Kazim-agha is documented as his primary advocate and the recipient of his poetry from exile. Lieutenant Ismail-agha managed villages in the district after the 1819 exile. Another brother, Saleh also attested from lapidary inscriptions. His other siblings included Ensign Yaqub-agha and sisters Pari Khanum and Huru Khanum.

In 1805, in the immediate aftermath of the campaigns, Prince Tsitsianov formalised the Kazakh district's status through a "Statute for the Kazakh Tatars" (Положение для Казахских Татар), which confirmed the Vekil's right to an annual salary of 400 rubles, mandated the provision of one child from each noble family as an amanat (hostage) to reside in Tiflis.

== Early life and military career ==
Mustafa-agha appears in Russian imperial records as early as October 1800, during the final months of the Kingdom of Kartli-Kakheti under the dying King George XII of Georgia. A report from General Lazarev to the Russian command notes the interception of letters "written from Dagestan to the Kazakh notable people Mustafa-aga and Shikh-aga regarding the current circumstances and intentions of" the Avar ruler Omar Khan. Omar Khan was simultaneously sending a separate letter to Panah-agha and "all the honorable Kazakh chiefs" attempting to recruit them into a coalition with the rebel Georgian prince Alexander Bagrationi to march on Tiflis. Mustafa-agha disclosed the correspondence to Lazarev rather than acting on it—establishing a pattern of intelligence cooperation that would define the first two decades of his career.

In 1804, he led a night operation on the banks of the Kura River to capture the rebellious Georgian prince Parnaoz Bagrationi, who was travelling with a group of Kakhetian and Ossetian retainers. Mustafa-agha sent the party food and meat across the river to lower their guard, then crossed under cover of darkness with Ali-agha and Russian officers including Merabov and Avalov. They first secured the horses and weapons and then took the princes captive, transferring them to Prince Tamaz Orbeliani for transport to Tiflis. Mustafa-agha's own letter to Tsitsianov describing the operation written in Persian frames the mission as an effort "to make good a previous mistake".

During the campaigns of 1804–1805 against Persia, Mustafa-agha and his brothers fought as commanders of the Kazakh irregular cavalry. In the summer of 1805, as Persian forces advanced toward the Dilijan and Agstafa passes, he led a counter-attack in the gorge that became the most heavily documented episode of their military service. Their report to the Russian command describes "fierce battle in the strong places [defiles] of the gorge", the capture of cannons and livestock from the retreating Persians, and a daring rescue of Prince Ivane Orbeliani, who had been taken captive by the Persian force. Members of the family were killed or wounded in the engagement. General Tsitsianov subsequently ordered that the Kazakh commanders be publicly commended for their "victory over the Persians."

The same year Crown Prince Abbas Mirza sent formal firmans (decrees) to the Kazakh feudals demanding that they defect and join the Persian army at Ak-tepe, accompanied by a proclamation from Prince Alexander Bagrationi calling the Kazakhs to the Akstafa River. Mustafa-agha, Ali-agha, and two other senior leaders forwarded these documents intact to the Russian command.

In October 1808, Mustafa-agha participated in a punitive raid into the Ottoman Akhaltsikhe led by general Ivan Akhverdov. Involving irregular cavalry from the Borchali, Kazakh, and Shamshadil districts alongside Georgian Kakhetian militias, the raid drove off approximately 1,000 head of cattle, 200 donkeys, and 8,000 sheep from Ottoman villages. General Akhverdov's report to the Commander-in-Chief, Count Gudovich, singles out Mustafa-agha by name for his "brave conduct" and specifically notes that he and Amir-Khan-agha arranged for a portion of the captured livestock to be distributed to feed Russian infantry.

In September 1810, Persian forces under Ali-Shah (brother of Abbas Mirza) attacked the summer pastures of the Shamshadil and Kazakh populations. Mustafa-agha again led the response in a three-day engagement in the Kazakh highlands. Captain Ladinsky's report to General Alexander Tormasov lists Mustafa-agha among the commanders who "personally engaged the enemy" and praises a kinsman, identified as Yusuf-agha, for leading infantry and capturing cannons from the retreating Persians near Lake Gokcha. General Tormasov wrote separately to Prince Kurakin praising the Kazakh population for "zeal and loyalty beyond any other Muslim society in Georgia" and recommending an imperial charter as a permanent mark of favour. For his combined record of service, Mustafa-agha was promoted to the rank of Major and awarded the Gold Medal "For Bravery" and a silver medal in 1810.

The first serious rupture in Mustafa-agha's relationship with the Russian command came in December 1811. A contingent of Kazakh irregular cavalry sent to assist Colonel Kotlyarevsky during operations near the Akhalkalaki fortress deserted rather than fight, scattering back toward their home districts. The Commander-in-Chief in Georgia, Marquis Paulucci described the Kazakh cavalry as "worthless" and accused the local elders of "weak command." As punishment, 24 Kazakh men judged most responsible were sentenced to run the gauntlet in a public ceremony in Tiflis, and the four commanding elders were arrested and held for two weeks.

== Conflict with Yermolov ==
The arrival of General Aleksey Yermolov as Commander-in-Chief of the Caucasus in 1816 initiated a systematic dismantling of the semi-autonomous arrangements that earlier governors had tolerated. Yermolov argued that local feudal rulers like Mustafa-agha maintained power through the "abuses" of customary law and that Russian officers posted as district heads were being manipulated because they did not speak the "Tatar" (Azerbaijani) language. He wrote to the civil administration in 1817 that the Kazakh district was to be placed firmly under the Governor of Georgia.

In March 1819, after a period of sustained tension, Yermolov issued his final justification for stripping the lords of their power, accusing them of treating their peasants "as their own property" rather than as subjects of the Russian state. This was followed by a formal Regulation on the means of maintaining the Kazakh, Shamshadil, and Borchali aghas, which defined Mustafa-agha's new duties and constraints in precise terms. Under the regulation he was personally responsible for reporting "thieves, robbers, and runaway people" and could be arrested and deported if he concealed them. He was also forbidden from gathering an armed force for any purpose not authorised by the Russian command and was forbidden from physically punishing subjects or levying "unlawful monetary collections"; a sustained pattern of complaints could lead to his removal from power.

The traditional tarkhan status, the tax exemption enjoyed by his closest loyal followers was abolished; all inhabitants were now obligated to the state treasury. Village elders were henceforth to be elected by villagers rather than appointed by Mustafa-agha, subject to oversight by the Russian pristav.

By early 1819, the Russian command had received intelligence from spies and informants indicating that Mustafa-agha and Nasib Sultan of Shamshadil were in communication with Abbas Mirza and with the exiled Georgian prince Alexander Bagrationi who had been given lands near the Erivan Khanate by the Persian government specifically to facilitate the recruitment of defectors from the Kazakh district. A report dated 28 June 1819 from General Velyaminov to General Yermolov quotes captured intelligence that "scouts have learned that the Kazakh and Shamshadil inhabitants, with the consent of their aghas, Mustafa-agha Shikhilinskiy [and Nasib-Sultan], have asked Abbas Mirza for protection and assistance in their crossing of the border."

On 7 May 1819, Prince Valerian Madatov carried out what he described to Yermolov as the "secret order." He summoned Mustafa-agha and Nasib-Sultan to Elisabethpol under the pretext of routine administrative business while they were still resident in their home villages. Upon their arrival, he arrested both men immediately and dispatched them to Tiflis under "most strict guard." All documents found in their homes written in the Azerbaijani language were seized and sent for translation.

News of the arrest spread quickly through the Kazakh district. A report from Colonel Lapinsky dated 13 May 1819 described that the Kazakh elders assembled at a prominent meeting point; Kazim-agha, Mustafa-agha's brother together with local Muslim clergy led a collective effort to draft a formal petition for his release. Lapinsky noted that Mustafa-agha "was not satisfied with having equal rights to other lords; he wanted to be the first [among equals]," and that his influence over the local population's "minds" remained strong. The meetings ultimately produced no outcome: the Russian military had already determined that his removal from the Caucasus was permanent. A concurrent intelligence report revealed that Mustafa-agha's brother Ismail-agha was himself under secret suspicion for correspondence with the Georgian pretender, though General Velyaminov chose not to arrest him immediately for fear of triggering a general revolt. He noted in writing that if Ismail-agha fled with only his immediate family, "the loss of one scoundrel will be useful for the tranquility of the people."

A formal proclamation was read aloud in the mosques of the Kazakh district, first in Russian and then "clearly and loudly" in Azerbaijani, under the surveillance of Russian officers instructed to ensure the mullah did not alter its meaning during translation. The proclamation framed the exile as a response to "insidious and ill-intentioned acts," specified the charges — attempting to persuade subjects to flee across the border, spreading false rumours of military conscription and increased taxation — and explicitly promised that Mustafa-agha's relatives and children, having committed no crime, remained free and in possession of their properties.

Yermolov then ordered the formal redistribution of Mustafa-agha's lands. Rather than confiscating them into the state treasury, he distributed them to Mustafa-agha's two wives, three sons, two brothers, and father but exclusively as standard private estates, stripped of any sovereign or hereditary administrative character. The family retained its wealth but lost its political authority. The Kazakh Sultanate as a governing institution was thereby dissolved.

== Exile and death ==
Mustafa-agha was dispatched to the Russian interior and never returned to the Caucasus. The precise destination of his exile is uncertain in the scholarly record. Kocharli, writing closer in time to the events and drawing on Azerbaijani oral tradition, states that he settled in Kazan, adding "according to one account, Kharkov." Caferoğlu and Vekilli, both writing in the Azerbaijani diaspora press in Istanbul, repeat the Kazan or Kharkov formulation. The question of the exact location remains unresolved.

In exile, he adopted the pseudonym Arif ("The Knowing" or "The Wise") and composed poetry in the classical Azerbaijani literary tradition. His literary output is modest in surviving quantity. He was a follower of the poetic school of Molla Panah Vagif, the eighteenth-century vizier of the Karabakh Khanate and one of the founding voices of modern Azerbaijani verse.

His most celebrated work, "Ağlaram" ("I Lament"), was sent in verse form from exile to his brother Kazim-agha. The poem idealises the period before the Russian conquest and is an unambiguous rejection of the political order that produced his exile. Further verse letters addressed to his sons Abdulla-agha and Ali-agha similarly express the grief of displacement and confirm that he "was indeed an opponent of Russia, or at least became one as a result of the exile." His surviving poems were published in the anthology «Məcmuə» (Majmua), compiled by Mirza Huseyn Gaibov. The Azerbaijani philologist and critic Firidun bey Kocharli discussed his work in Materials on the History of Azerbaijani Literature and introduced him to a wider scholarly readership.

Mustafa-agha died in exile before 1842. (Note: The date of death is not precisely known. A conventional estimate of 1845 appears in Kasimzade (1962) but Barmanbay (2021, p. 747) states explicitly that "the date of death is not precisely known; 1845 is estimated." The upper bound of before 1842 is established by the biography of Kazım Ağa Salik (1781–1842), which records that Salik was devastated in old age by the death of his brother Mustafa, implying Mustafa predeceased him.) The location of his burial is unknown.

== Family ==
Mustafa agha was married to Aisha Khanum (died 1842), daughter of Panah-agha Kosalu (died 1802). Panah-agha was the senior elder of the Kazakh district during the late eighteenth century. In 1796, during Count Valerian Zubov's Persian Expedition—the first major Russian military incursion into Transcaucasia—Panah-agha led a delegation of Kazakh and Shamshadil elders to the Russian camp near Ganja. He performed the formal oath of loyalty and was received by Prince Pavel Tsitsianov (then serving under Zubov as General-Ensign) as the district's paramount negotiator. For this act he received a Gold Medal bearing the portrait of Empress Catherine II. In further documentation of 1801, General Lazarev described Panah-agha as "a very important elder whom they all listen to and who has been very zealous."

Mustafa-agha's brother-in-law Ali-agha, served as the district's Vekil (Chief Representative), the highest administrative title the Kazakh nobles held under successive Georgian and, after 1801, Russian overlordship. When a substantial group of Kazakh nobles defected to the Persian side during the first siege of Erivan in 1804, Ali-agha remained conspicuously loyal. Prince Tsitsianov wrote to him directly: "I know that you did not participate in this [betrayal]", tasking him with persuading the defectors to return and delivering grain supplies to Russian winter quarters at Karaklis as a demonstration of "zeal."

Mustafa had three sons, including Abdullah-agha and Ali-agha.

== See also ==
- Kazakh Sultanate
- Aleksey Yermolov
- Molla Panah Vagif
- Azerbaijani literature
- Russo-Persian War (1804–1813)
