= Ziyadoghlu =

Branch of the Qajar tribe

Ziyadoghlu Qajar (Azerbaijani: Ziyadoğlu Qacar, زیاد اوغلو قاجار, lit. 'Qajars (who are) sons of Ziyad') or Ziyadlu (Persian: زیادلو) were a branch of the Qajar tribe that governed Safavid Karabakh from 1546–1554 to 1743 (sometimes, also including Safavid Kakheti), Astarabad in various times, Ganja Khanate from 1747 to 1805.

== History ==
=== Karabakh-Ganja branch ===
According to Mohammad Masum Isfahani, the branch took its name from a popular sufi Ummat beg, son of Khizir beg Qajar who was given this name by Ismail I. Ummat beg's son Shahverdi Sultan was the first Safavid beylerbey of Karabakh appointed by Tahmasp I. There were other Qajars such as Piri Beg Qajar and his son Rustam beg who governed Karabakh earlier as hakems, however. Beylerbeys of Karabakh were marcher lords and received 25000 tomans and 987 dinars as salary and could raise a military contingent of 6100 soldiers. Shahverdi's brother descendants governed as beylerbeys as well. Shahverdi was succeeded by his brother Ibrahim (1568–1570) and then his son Yusuf Khalifa (1570), who was assassinated by his cousin Peykar khan (1570–1577). Khalil, a son of Shahverdi was appointed as beylerbey of Astarabad in 1563. Ziyadoghlus returned to rule Karabakh in 1588 when Muhammad, son of Khalil was appointed as beylerbey (later, also Ganja in 1606). Another son of Khalil Hasan became darugha of Shiraz in 1590–1597, Ray in 1597–1605, Arasbaran in 1605–1607. His brother Husain beg was beylerbey of Astarabad and later Karabakh in 1607 (he may have been same person with Hasan). Muhammad's son Murshidqoli was governor of Kakheti in 1606. His son Mohammadqoli was also a beylerbey of Karabakh. His brother Mortezaqoli ruled Karabakh in 1651-1664 and Kakheti. He was succeeded by his son Ughurlu whose tenure spanned from 1664 to 1666. Oghurlu's son Abbasqoli Khan served in Karabakh from 1666 and in Kakheti from 1688 to 1694. He was succeeded by his brother Kalbali (or Qalb-ʿAlī Khan) who ruled Karabakh and Kakheti from 1694 to 1702 also had the title mosaheb (associate). Kalbali's son was Oghurlu II who succeeded him in 1702 and ruled until November 1738 when he was killed during a campaign together with Nader's brother Ebrahim against Qazikumukh. His son Shahverdi became beylerbey in 1740, succeeding his father. However, he later supported Sam Mirza, a pretender who claimed to be son of Shah Soltan Hussein and was forced to seek exile in Georgia after facing an attack from Nasrullah Mirza, son of Nader. After assassination of Nader in 1747, Shahverdi founded the Ganja Khanate, whose dynasty ruled until 1805.

Desdendants of branch were later known as Ziyadkhanov in Russian empire (eg. Adil Khan Ziyadkhanov), while Iranian descendants adopted the surname Javadkhani.

=== Yerevan branch ===
This clan was better known as Ziadlu or Qajar-Ziadlu. First ruler of Iravan Khanate from Ziyadoghlu family was Hasan Ali Khan (1755–1759/62) who also bore the title Sardar Iravani. He was succeeded by his brother Hoseyn Ali Khan (1759/62-83); his son Ghulam Ali Khan (1783–84); his brother Mohammad Khan (1784–1805). Mohammad Khan was replaced by non-Ziadlu rulers like Mahdi-Quli Khan (1805–06) and Ahmed Khan (1806–07). Last sardar of Iravan was Hoseyn-Quli Khan (1807–28), a son of Mohammad Khan. According to historian George Bournoutian Hossein-Quli and his father Mohammad were from Qovanlu branch, thus very close to ruling Qajar dynasty, however they were Ziyadlu according to Arian K. Zarrinkafsch-Bahman and Amir-Ali Sardar Iravani - both descendants of Qajars. According to former's version Mohammad khan was married to a Mah Ruhsar Khanum Zin al-Dawla, a daughter of Fath Ali Shah, that's why they became extended members of Qajar dynasty. According to latter, who holds a copy of waqf document, Hasan Ali and Hoseyn Ali, were sons of Muhammad Khan Qajar-Iravani who was the assassin of Nader Shah.

This branch married into Qajar dynasty became extended family of royal house. Descendants of this branch in Iran bear the surnames Sardar Iravani, Ziadlou and others; Russian branch were surnamed Erivanski or Iravanski (for example, Karim Khan Iravanski). A branch who moved to Turkey is surnamed Turgut.

== Genetics ==
Although some authors suggested that, Qovanlu branch of Qajars who ruled Iran from 1789 to 1925, which is currently better known as Qajar dynasty was a cadet-branch of Ziyadoghlu family, however, recent archaeogenetic research refutes this genealogical link. A Y-DNA study by Aliyev et al. analyzing patrilineal descendants of Javad Khan determined that the Ziyadoghlu lineage belongs to haplogroup R1b-Y128770, whereas verified patrilineal descendants of the Qajar royal dynasty belong to haplogroup J1-Y271395. Because these two lineages belong to fundamentally divergent haplogroups separated by tens of thousands of years, the findings rule out a recent common male-line ancestor, demonstrating that their shared "Qajar" identity reflects a broader tribal confederation rather than direct patrilineal descent.
