= Battle of Ganja =

Battle of Ganja may refer to:

- Siege of Ganja (1796)
- Battle of Ganja (1804)
- Battle of Ganja (1826)
