= Salim Khan (disambiguation) =

Salim Khan (born 1935) is an Indian film actor and screenwriter.

Salim Khan may also refer to:

- Salim Khan (Shaki khan) (1795–1797), the sixth khan of Shaki
- Salim Khan I, or Selim I, Sultan of the Ottoman Empire 1512–1520
- Salim Khan Shams al-Dinlu, an early 17th-century Safavid military leader

== See also ==
- Salim Khan family, the family of Salim Khan in Indian cinema
- Saleem Khan (disambiguation)
