= Tamaz Orbeliani =

Georgian prince and Russian imperial general (1769–1815)

- თამაზ ორბელიანი
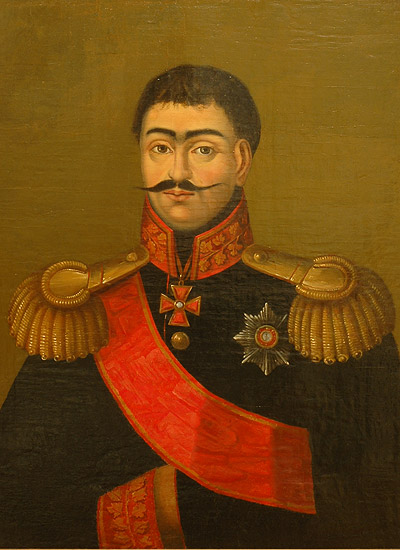
- Tamaz (Toma) Orbeliani
- Born: 1769; Kingdom of Kartli-Kakheti
- Died: 12 July 1815 (aged 45–46); Tiflis, Russian Empire
- Burial place: Sioni Cathedral, Tbilisi
- Relatives: Ana Orbeliani (sister)
- Military career
- Allegiance: Russian Empire
- Branch: Infantry
- Rank: General-Major
- Conflicts: Battle of Krtsanisi (1795)
- Awards: Order of St. Anna, 1st class Order of St. Vladimir, 3rd class

Tamaz Orbeliani (Georgian: თამაზ (თომა) მამუკას ძე ორბელიანი; 1769 – 12 July 1815) was a Georgian prince, military and political figure of the Kingdom of Kartli-Kakheti, and a General-Major in the Imperial Russian Army. A member of the Orbeliani noble family, he served the Russian Empire through the turbulent transition from Georgian sovereignty to Russian imperial rule, participating in major campaigns across the Caucasus and rising to become Marshal of the Georgian Nobility of Tiflis Governorate.

== Background and family ==
Tamaz Orbeliani was born in 1769 into the prominent Orbeliani princely family. His father was Prince Mamuka Orbeliani, son of Prince Dimitri Orbeliani and Princess Anna, daughter of King Teimuraz II of Kartli. His mother was Maya, daughter of Giorgi, Eristavi of Ksani. His sister Ana became the wife of David II of Imereti.

Through his paternal grandmother Princess Ana (died 4 December 1788) — sister of King Erekle II — Tamaz held hereditary rights to the mouravate (governorship) of Demurchi-Hasanlu in Lower Kartli, an estate Erekle II had originally granted as a dowry to his sister Ana. This connection to the Bagrationi royal house defined both his privileges and his political entanglements throughout his career.

== Service under the Georgian kingdom ==
During the reigns of Erekle II and George XII, Tamaz Orbeliani held the court title of Eshik-aqasi-bashi (Minister of Ceremonies) as well as the mourav of Demurchi-Hasanlu. He participated in the Battle of Krtsanisi in 1795, when Persian forces under Agha Mohammad Khan sacked Tiflis, and subsequently took part in the city's reconstruction.

During the dynastic struggles among the Bagrationi family in the final years of the Georgian kingdom, Orbeliani aligned himself with the party of Prince Iulon. George XII stripped him of his titles on charges of treason. In 1801, following the death of George XII and the Russian proclamation annexing Kartli-Kakheti, Orbeliani fled to Imereti together with the princes Parnaoz and Iulon. He subsequently reconciled himself with the annexation, entered Russian imperial service, and recovered his lost privileges.

== Service under Russia ==
In 1802 Orbeliani was granted the civilian rank of State Councillor and subsequently the military rank of Brigadier. In January 1803, General Pavel Tsitsianov dispatched him to the Khan of Erivan to conduct negotiations regarding the patriarchate of Daniel II among the Armenian clergy.

During the 1804 Mtiuleti rebellion, Orbeliani was central to the apprehension of his kinsman Prince Parnaoz, who was attempting to flee to Qajar Iran. The operation was carried out by Mustafa-agha Shikhlinski, the leading noble of the Kazakh sultanate, and his men, who intercepted the prince's party on the banks of the Kura River during a night crossing. Having secured the horses and weapons of the fugitives, Mustafa-agha handed the captive prince over to Orbeliani, who transported him to Tiflis. For this operation Orbeliani received promotion to the rank of General-Major.

In 1809, Orbeliani took part in the capture of Poti. In December 1810, he participated in the Russian army's campaign against Akhaltsikhe under General Alexander Tormasov. After a ten-day siege that failed to reduce the Ottoman fortress, the force was compelled to retreat into the Borjomi Gorge. During this retreat, Orbeliani's men discovered the Borjomi mineral springs, which would later become one of the most celebrated mineral water sources in the Caucasus.

In 1811, Orbeliani commissioned the construction of the "Salkhino" tower in the village of Vashlovani, in present-day Tetritskaro Municipality. From 1812 he served as Marshal of the Georgian Nobility of Tiflis Governorate. In 1813 he accompanied General Nikolay Rtishchev to the negotiations that concluded the Treaty of Gulistan with Persia.

Tamaz Orbeliani died on 12 July 1815 at the age of 47. He was buried at Sioni Cathedral in Tbilisi.

== Awards ==
- Order of St. Anna, 1st class
- Order of St. Vladimir, 3rd class

== Ancestry ==
Ancestors of Tamaz Orbeliani

16. Prince Tamaz Orbeliani
8. Prince Mamuka Orbeliani
17. Princess Khampervan N.
4. Prince Dimitri Orbeliani
2. Prince Mamuka Orbeliani
20. Heraclius I of Kakheti
10. Teimuraz II
21. Princess Anna Cholokashvili
5. Princess Anna of Kakheti
22. Vakhtang VI
11. Tamar of Kartli
23. Princess Rusudan of Circassia
1. Princess Ana Orbeliani
6. Giorgi, duke of Ksani
3. Maia Eristavi of Ksani

== Family ==
Orbeliani was married to Princess Ketevan Kobulashvili (died 1852), sister of Sergi Kobulashvili and Otar Kobulashvili. They had five children:

- Ana (1796–1844), wife of Prince Luarsab Orbeliani
- Dimitri Orbeliani (1797–1868), General-Lieutenant
- Mamuka Orbeliani (1800–1871), General-Major
- Nino (1808–1827), wife of Prince Ioane Eristavi of Ksani
- Ivane Orbeliani (1809–1866), General-Major

== Bibliography ==
- Babayev, E. (2003). Iz istorii gyandzhinskogo khanstva [From the History of the Ganja Khanate] (in Russian). Baku.
- Berdzishvili, M. (1980). Berdzishvili, Mamia (ed.). Masalebi XIX saukunis pirveli nakhevris kartuli sazogadoebriovis istoriisatvis [Materials for the History of Georgian Society in the First Half of the Nineteenth Century] (in Georgian). Vol. II: Biographical Dictionary (A–E). Tbilisi: Metsniereba. pp. 147–149.
- Chikovani, Yu. Rod knyazey Orbeliani [The Orbeliani Princely Family] (PDF) (in Russian). Archived from the original (PDF) on 29 December 2010.
- Gogitidze, M. (2001). Gruzinskiy generalitet (1699–1921) [The Georgian Generalship, 1699–1921] (in Russian). Kyiv.
- Akty Kavkazskoy Arkheograficheskoy Komissii [Acts of the Caucasian Archaeographic Commission] (in Russian). Vol. II. Tiflis. 1868.
- Tvauri, M. (2003). "K voprosu ob istorii obnaruzheniya Borzhomskikh mineralnykh istochnikov [On the History of the Discovery of the Borjomi Mineral Springs]" (PDF). Saqartvelostvis sameditsino zhurnali (in Georgian). Archived from the original (PDF) on 3 November 2013.
