= Kazim agha Salik =

Azerbaijani poet

- Born: Kazim agha Ali agha oghlu Salahli; 1781; Shusha
- Died: 1842 (aged 60–61); Azerbaijan
- Occupation: Poet

Kazim agha Salik (Azerbaijan: Kazım ağa Salik; 1781 in İkinci Şıxlı, Kazakh sultanate – 1842 in İkinci Şıxlı, Georgia Governorate, Russian Empire) was an Azerbaijani poet, brother of Mustafa agha Arif and member of Shikhlinskis noble family. His brother Mustafa agha Arif was the last sultan of Kazakh sultanate.

== Life ==
Salik, originally from the Shamkir region, was born in 1781 in the village of İkinci Şıxlı of the Kazakh sultanate, where he received his first training and education. Salik's paternal ancestors were called "Shahzade", and his mother came from a noble family of Dilbaz. Later, his ancestors moved to Shikhly. The poet, who enjoyed deep respect in the environment in which he lived from childhood, spent his youth happy and joyful, and did not see any financial difficulties. He always looked at life optimistically and encouraged his contemporaries to enjoy the blessings of the world. However, the death of his brother Mustafa agha Arif, later his daughter Heyrannisa, and then his close friend and colleague Yahya bey at an advanced age seriously affected Salik's health. The poet died in 1842 in his native village.

== Creativity ==
Kazym-aga Salik is one of the most talented poets of his time. He continued and developed the classical style of poetry, the traditions of Fuzuli and the literary school of Molla Panah Vagif in Azerbaijani literature. In his writings, he preached a happy life and a meaningful life. Salik was also a friend of Mirza Mahammed Fedai. The poet also spoke Persian and wrote poems and Ghazals in it.

== See also ==
- Mirza Sadig Latifov
