= Borchaly sultanate =

Turkic sultanate in Caucasus

The Sultanate of Borchaly
- 1604–1801
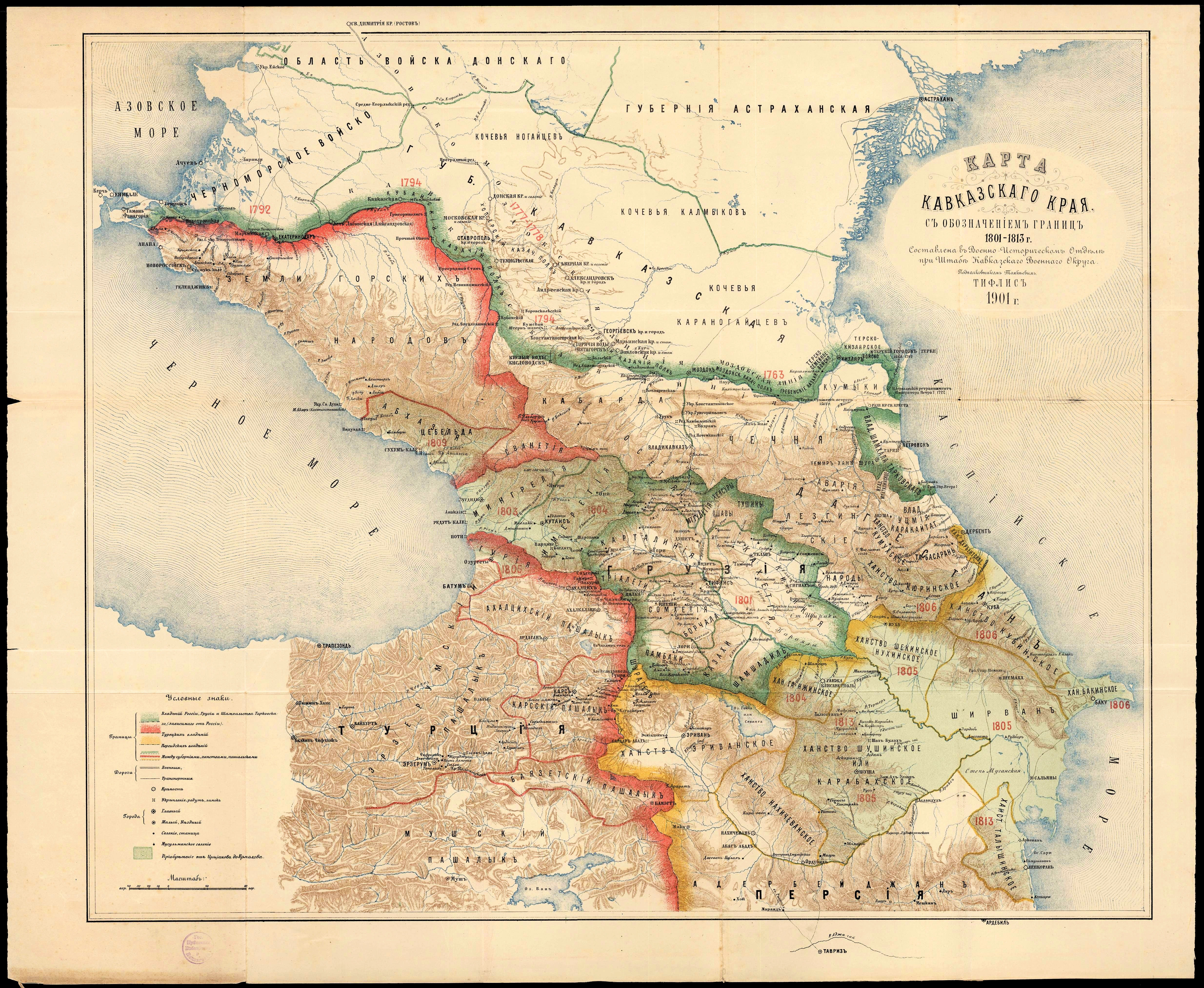
- Map of Russian administrative units between 1801-1813, including the Georgia Governorate (center) which included the territory of the Borchaly sultanate as one of its divisions.
- Status: Sultanate
- Common languages: Persian, Azerbaijani, Armenian, Georgian
- Religion: Islam
- Government: Absolute monarchy
- History
  - Established: 1604
  - Disestablished: 1801

Area
  - Total: 6,528 km^{2} (2,520 sq mi)
Preceded by	Succeeded by
Safavid dynasty	Russian Empire

Borchaly sultanate (also known as Borchaly khanate) — was a feudal state that existed until the middle of the 18th century on the territory of the historical region of Borchaly (modern day Georgia and the Lori region of Armenia).

== History ==
According to the Georgian Soviet Encyclopedia, at the beginning of the 17th century, during the rule of Shah Abbas I, the Turkic tribe Borchalu migrated to Debed Valley, which gave its name to the region Borchaly. In 1604 the Borchaly khanate (sultanate) was established here. In the 1750s, King Teimuraz II took over the Sultanate of Borchaly, and in 1765 the king of Kartli-Kakheti, Irakli II, transformed the sultanate into a prefecture. By the beginning of the 19th century, the sultanate was completely dissolved and became part of the Russian Empire.

== Rulers ==
- Musa Kuli-khan, son of Kelbi Huseyn-khan (1752–1755)

== See also ==
- Kazakh sultanate
- Shamshadil sultanate
- Shoragel sultanate
- Khanates of the Caucasus
- South Caucasus
- Azerbaijan Democratic Republic
