= Morteza Qoli Khan =

Morteza Qoli Khan may refer to:

- Morteza Qoli Khan Qajar (1750/1755 – 1798/1800), prince of Persia's Qajar dynasty
- Morteza Qoli Khan (Safavid governor) (fl. 1651–1664), Iranian official of Turkoman origin
