= Mohammad-Qoli Khan Qajar =

Safavid military leader and official

Governor of Karabakh-Ganja
- In office 1616–1627
- Monarch: Abbas the Great
- Preceded by: Mohammad-Khan b. Khalil Khan Qajar
- Succeeded by: Daud Khan Undiladze
- In office 1633–Unknown
- Monarch: Safi of Persia
- Preceded by: Daud Khan Undiladze
- Succeeded by: Morteza-Qoli Qajar

Personal details
- Tribe: Qajar

Military service
- Allegiance: Safavid Iran

Mohammad-Qoli Khan Qajar was an Iranian military leader and official, who served as the governor (beglarbeg) of Karabakh and Ganja in 1616-1627 and 1633. He was a son of the previous governor of Karabakh, Mohammad-Khan Qajar (1606–1616), and a member of the Ziyādoghlu branch of the Turkoman Qajar clan. Around 1620, when Paykar Khan Igirmi Durt was given a sister of Luarsab II of Kartli by then incumbent Shah Abbas I (r. 1588-1629) on the occasion of him being appointed as the new governor of Kakheti, Mohammad-Qoli Khan Qajar was given a sister of Teimuraz I of Kakheti. When in 1624, Shah Abbas I married his granddaughter to Simon II of Kartli (Semayun Khan), Anduqapar Amilakhvari's wife was a companion to the bride, while Mohammad-Qoli Khan Qajar ordered Paykar Khan Igirmi Durt to host the banquet in the second term of the wedding party.

== Sources ==
- Dumin, S.V., ed. (1996). Дворянские роды Российской империи. Том 3. Князья [Noble families of the Russian Empire. Volume 3: Princes] (in Russian). Moscow: Linkominvest.
- Floor, Willem M. (2008). Titles and Emoluments in Safavid Iran: A Third Manual of Safavid Administration, by Mirza Naqi Nasiri. Washington, DC: Mage Publishers. ISBN 978-1933823232.
- Floor, Willem; Herzig, Edmund, eds. (2012). "Exploitation of the Frontier". Iran and the World in the Safavid Age. I.B. Tauris. ISBN 978-1780769905.
- Rayfield, Donald (2012). Edge of Empires: A History of Georgia. Reaktion Books. ISBN 978-1780230306.

| Preceded by Mohammad-Khan b. Khalil Khan Qajar | Governor of Karabakh-Ganja (1st term); 1616–1627 | Succeeded by Daud Khan Undiladze |
| Preceded by Daud Khan Undiladze | Governor of Karabakh-Ganja (2nd term); 1633-? | Succeeded by Morteza-Qoli Qajar |
