= Mehdi Huseyn =

Azerbaijani writer (1909–1965)

Mehdi Huseyn Mehdi Hüseyn
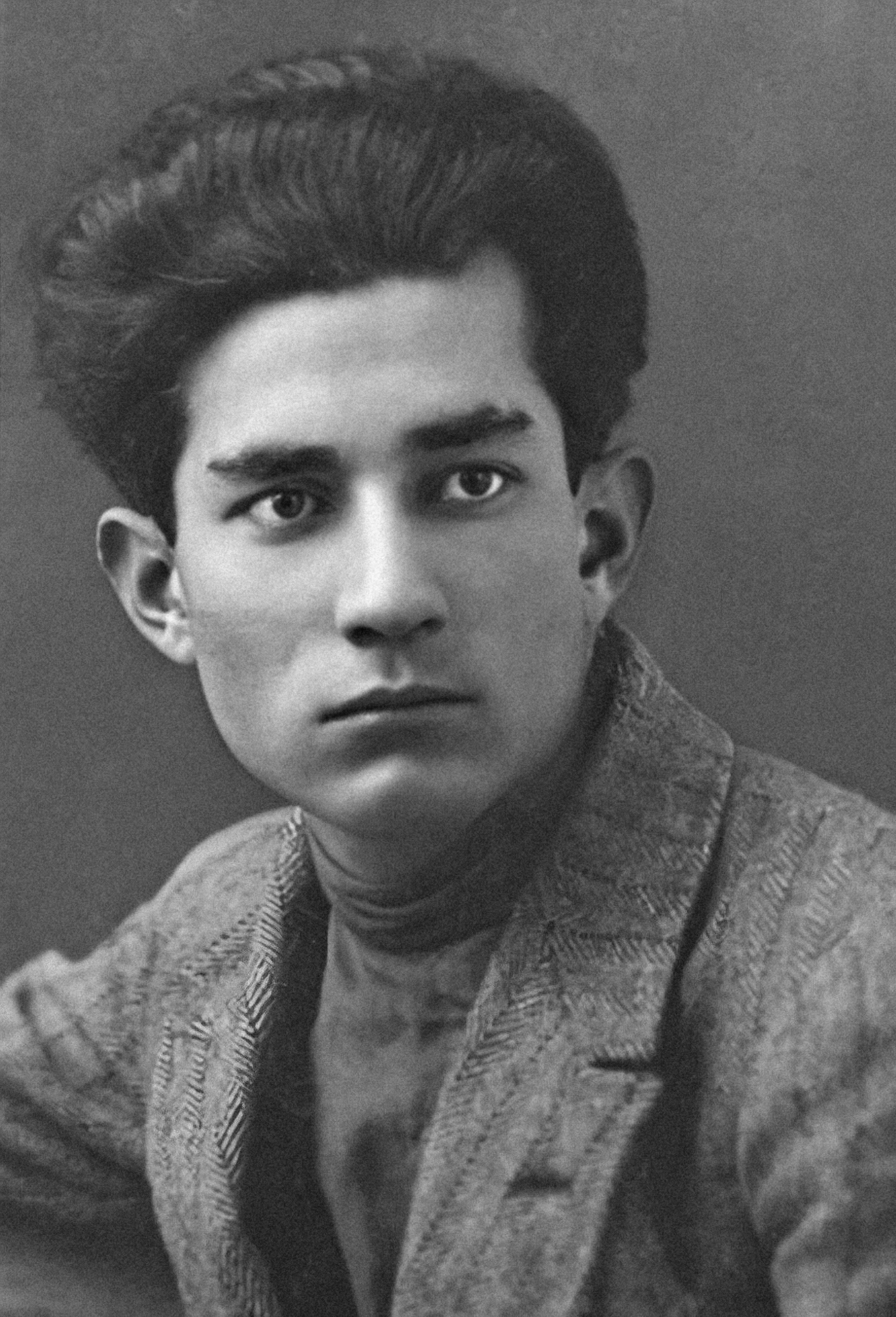
- Mehdi Huseyn, Azerbaijani writer
- Born: April 17, 1909 İkinci Şıxlı, Gazakh Rayon, Azerbaijan
- Died: March 10, 1965 (aged 55) Baku, Azerbaijan Soviet Socialist Republic, Soviet Union
- Occupation: Writer

Mehdi Ali oglu Huseynov, better known by the pseudonym Mehdi Huseyn (Azerbaijani: Mehdi Hüseyn; 17 April 1909 – 10 March 1965), was an Azerbaijani and Soviet writer and critic, laureate of the State Stalin Prize of the third degree (1950) and member of the All-Union Communist Party since 1941.

== Education ==
Huseyn was born on April 4, 1909, in İkinci Şıxlı village of Azerbaijan, into a family of a People's teacher. At seven years old he attended a village school, that taught in Russian. In 1920, he entered a pedagogical technical school and the following year went to Komsomol. In 1930, he graduated in history from Azerbaijan University, and in 1936 studied at the Gerasimov Institute of Cinematography in Moscow.

== Career ==
Huseyn wrote his first "Shearing of sheep" narrative in the last year at the secondary school, and it was published in 1926, in Sharg Gadini magazine ("Woman of the East"). His earlier stories describe an Azerbaijani village of post-revolutionary years and a struggle against patriarchal and feudal relations. His works dedicated to the Civil war are stories in "Khaver" and "Spring floods" collections written in 1926-1932, and "Flood" novel (1936). His writings feature a theme of socialistic reconstruction of an Azerbaijani village in "Tarlan" ("Fight"). He also wrote the first historical narrative of Azerbaijan "Commissar" (1942) about Meshadi Azizbekov.

He wrote "Call" narrative and a book of stories called "My motherland" during the Great Patriotic War. His "Absheron" novel published in 1947, is based on a story about heroic labor of Azerbaijani oilmen. Its sequel "Black rocks" was published in 1957 on the subject of Mollayev, whose prototype was M.Baghirov. Historical novel "Morning" (1949-1952) was dedicated to revolutionary struggle of Baku laborers in 1907-1908. In 1966, "Underground waters flow to the ocean" novel was published after his death.

Film-drama "Poet" (1937), "Glory" play (1939) – about a frontline village of Azerbaijan, "Nizami" (1940), "Javanshir" (1945), "Waiting" (1944, together with I. Efendiyev) about loyalty to a civic duty, are the most famous drama works of the author. Mehdi Huseyn is also famed as a critic and publicist. Literary-critical articles about the issues of socialist realism, adoption of a literal heritage of the past, learning of classic Russian literature and works of Russian Soviet writers belong to his pen.

He was the chairman Union of Writers of the Azerbaijan Soviet Socialist Republic, secretary of the USSR Union of Writers, deputy of Supreme Soviet of the Azerbaijan SSR of the 5th convocation and deputy of Supreme Soviet of the Soviet Union of the 6th convocation.

Mehdi Huseyn died on March 10, 1965, and is buried in the Alley of Honor.

== Recognition ==
A street in Imishli was named after Mehdi Huseyn.

== Literary works ==
- "Flood" – novel, (1933-1936);
- "Tarlan" – narrative, (1940, translated into Russian as "Fight" in 1956);
- "Commissar" – narrative, (1942, Russian translation 1949);
- "Call" – narrative, (1943);
- "Javanshir", historic narrative, (1945);
- "Daybreak" – narrative, (1950);
- "Absheron" – novel, (1947, Russian translation in 1949);
- "Black rocks" – novel, (1957);
- "Morning" – historic novel, (part 1-2, 1950-1953, Russian translation in 1954);
- "Underground Waters Flow to the Sea" (1966).

== Awards and prizes ==
The State Stalin Prize of the third degree (1950) – for "Absheron" novel (1947)
