= İkinci Şıxlı =

- Municipality
- Location within Azerbaijan
- Coordinates: 41°18′43″N 45°06′07″E
- Country: Azerbaijan
- Rayon: Qazakh

Population
  - Total: 3,565
- Time zone: UTC+4 (AZT)
  - Summer (DST): UTC+5 (AZT)

İkinci Şıxlı is a village and municipality in the Qazakh Rayon of Azerbaijan next to the Azerbaijan–Georgia border. It has a population of 3,565. The main population is made up of the Karapapakhs.

== Notable natives ==
- Ali-Agha Shikhlinski — Russian, Azerbaijani and Soviet military commander, deputy Minister of Defense of Azerbaijan Democratic Republic.
- Javad bey Shikhlinski — Russian, Azerbaijani and Iranian military commander, Major-General.
- Ismayil Shykhly — People's writer of Azerbaijan.
- Kazim agha Salik — poet.
- Mehdi Huseyn — writer and critic.
- Mustafa Agha Arif — poet.
- Osman Sarivelli — People's Poet of Azerbaijan.
