= Ismayil Shykhly =

Azerbaijani writer (1919–1995)

- İsmayıl Şıxlı
- Born: İsmayıl Qəhrəman oğlu Şıxlınski; March 22, 1919; İkinci Şıxlı, Qazakh Rayon, Azerbaijan
- Died: July 26, 1995 (aged 76); Baku, Azerbaijan
- Education: Gazakh Pedagogical School
- Alma mater: Azerbaijan Pedagogical Institute
- Occupation: Writer
- Children: Elchin Shykhly, Farrukh Shykhly
- Writing career
- Years active: 1938-1995
- Genre: Prose
- Notable awards: Shohrat Order; Order of the Red Star; Order of the Red Banner of Labour; Medal "For the Defence of the Caucasus"; Medal "For the Victory over Germany in the Great Patriotic War 1941–1945"; Jubilee Medal "Twenty Years of Victory in the Great Patriotic War 1941–1945"; Jubilee Medal "Thirty Years of Victory in the Great Patriotic War 1941–1945"; Jubilee Medal "Forty Years of Victory in the Great Patriotic War 1941–1945"; Jubilee Medal "50 Years of the Armed Forces of the USSR"; Jubilee Medal "60 Years of the Armed Forces of the USSR"; Jubilee Medal "70 Years of the Armed Forces of the USSR"; Medal "For Distinguished Labour"; Medal "Veteran of Labour"; Jubilee Medal "In Commemoration of the 100th Anniversary of the Birth of Vladimir Ilyich Lenin"; Order of the Patriotic War

Ismayil Shykhly (Azerbaijani: İsmayıl Şıxlı; March 22, 1919 – July 26, 1995), also known by his birth name Ismayil Shikhlinsky Gahraman oglu (Azerbaijani: İsmayıl Şıxlınski Qəhrəman oğlu), was an Azerbaijani writer.

== Early years ==
Shykhly was born on March 22, 1919, in Ikinji Shykhly village of Qazakh Rayon of Azerbaijan. He studied in Kosalar village. In 1934, he enrolled in Qakhazh Pedagogical School. He was impressed by Samad Vurgun's poem "Yadıma düşdü" (I recollected) during his speech at Alexandr Pushkin's 100th anniversary celebrated in Qazakh.

The same year, Shykhly entered Baku State Pedagogical Institute. During his years in college, influenced by Vurgun's writing and Ashig folk art, he wrote many poems. His first poem "Quşlar" (Birds) was published in Ədəbiyyat qəzeti newspaper in 1938. He was a teacher by profession and wrote a number of books on ancient and national traditions. His most famous work, "Turbulent Kura" (Dəli Kür), was filmed in 1969 by Azerbaijanfilm.

On September 15, 1942, he volunteered for military service and fought in World War II through 1945.

== Career ==
Upon his return, he continued writing. His first novel, Həkimin nağılı (The Doctor's tale), was published in 1947.

From 1965 to 1968, he was the Chairman of Union of Azerbaijani Writers, and from 1976 to 1978, he was the Chief Editor of Azərbaycan magazine, From 1981 on, he was the First Secretary of the Union of Azerbaijani Writers. Shykhly had served as the deputy in Supreme Soviet of Azerbaijan SSR. He was awarded with Sheref, Red Banner of Labor and Shohrat orders for his contributions to Soviet and Azerbaijani literature.

Ismayil Shykhly died on July 26, 1995, in Baku. He was buried at Alley of Honor.

== Memorial ==
On January 28, 2019, Ilham Aliyev, the President of the Republic of Azerbaijan signed a decree on the celebration of the 100th anniversary of the birth of Ismayil Shykhly.

== Works ==
- "My Dead World" (Ölən Dünyam)
- "Turbulent Kura" (Dəli Kür)
- "Bury the Dead in the Cemetery" (Ölüləri Qəbristanda basdirin)
- "Exile of Dignity" (Namus Qaçağı)
- "The Coward Bullet" (Namərd Gülləsı)

== See also ==
- Ali-Agha Shikhlinski
