= Valerian Madatov =

Russian general (1782–1829)

Prince Valerian Grigoryevich Madatov
- Ռոստոմ Մադաթյան
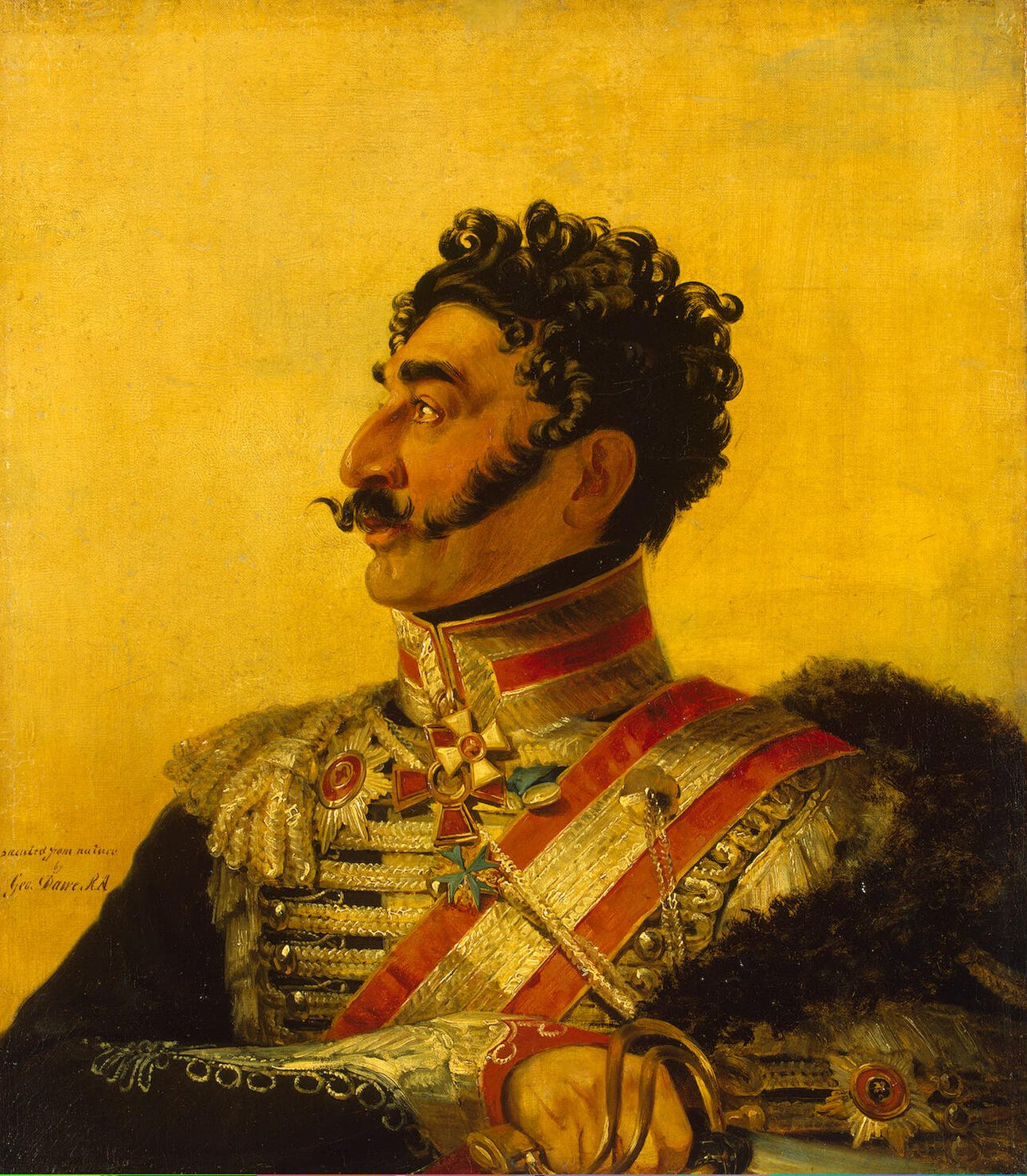
- Portrait of General Valerian Madatov by George Dawe, exhibited at the Military Gallery of the Winter Palace in St. Petersburg, 1820
- Born: 1782; Avetaranots, Karabakh Khanate, Zand Iran
- Died: September 4, 1829 (aged 46–47); Shumla, Silistra Eyalet, Ottoman Empire
- Military career
- Allegiance: Russia
- Branch: Imperial Russian Army
- Service years: 1806–1829
- Rank: Lieutenant General
- Unit: Leib Guard
- Conflicts: Russo-Turkish War (1806–1812); French invasion of Russia; Russo-Persian War (1826–1828)
- Awards: Order of St. George; Pour le Mérite; Order of Saint Anna

Prince Valerian Grigoryevich Madatov (Russian: Валериан Григорьевич Мадатов; Armenian: Ռոստոմ Գրիգորի Մադաթյան, romanized: Rostom Madatyan; 1782 – September 4, 1829) was a Russian-Armenian prince and lieutenant-general of the Russian Empire.

== Early life ==
Madatov was born Rostom Madatyan in 1782 in Avetaranots of the Principality of Varanda (present-day Azerbaijan), in a minor Armenian noble family as a melik (prince). At the age of 15, he left Karabakh for St. Petersburg with another senior nobleman to seek support from Catherine the Great in their efforts to abolish Muslim control of the region.

== Military career ==
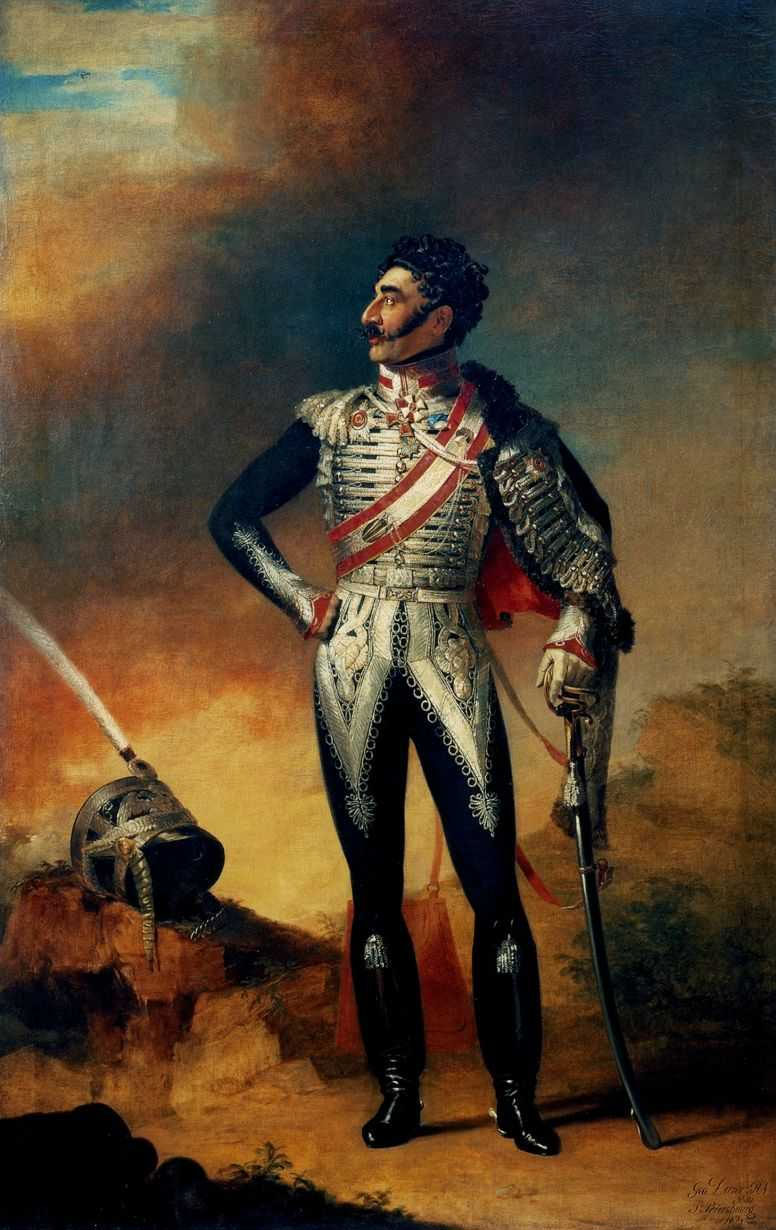
Portrait by George Dawe, 1824

In St. Petersburg, young Madatov joined the Leib Guard Preobrazhensky Regiment at the rank of praporshchik, and for the next 10 years spent his time training and serving in lower officer ranks. Madatov saw action for the first time in 1808 on the Danube during the storming of the Brailov fortress, where he received his first order of commendation. In 1810 Madatov joined the Aleksandriya Hussar Regiment as a captain and later as a major. Madatov's first major combat experience was during the Russo-Turkish War, 1806–1812. For his actions against the Turks he was given on April 11, 1811 the Order of St. George of 4th degree. During Napoleon's invasion of Russia, he commanded a detachment, and successfully served in Kobryn and Barysaŭ, as well as during the capture of Vilnius. In 1812 Madatov received the rank of colonel. The next year he was injured in Leipzig. Although still not fully recovered from his wound, Madatov was there to march his men across Paris. He would remain in France as one of the commanders of the occupational forces and as the Commander of the Hussar Brigade.

Field Marshal Hans Karl von Diebitsch referred to Madatov as "the Russian Murat". He was called back in 1815 to serve in the Caucasus, due to his familiarity with the region and the fact that he knew most of the major languages spoken in the area. He managed to consolidate Russian power by brokering peace with the local regional rulers. In 1816 Madatov was appointed the commander-in-chief of the Russian forces of the Karabakh Khanate, and was in command of the forces in several other former khanates. In 1818 Aleksey Petrovich Yermolov subjugated the Chechens with Madatov's aid.

In 1826, Persia attacked Karabakh, starting the Russo-Persian War. Madatov hurried to Tiflis to take command of the forces which would push the Persians out of the Southern Caucasus. The 2,000 men under Madatov's command routed the 10,000-man Persian army on the banks of the Shamkhor river and retook Ganja on September 5. Upon hearing the news, crown prince of Persia Abbas Mirza lifted the siege of Shusha and marched towards Ganja. Additional Russian reinforcements under Ivan Paskevich arrived just in time to join their forces with Madatov and to form an 8,000-strong corps under Paskevich's command. Near Ganja they fell upon the Persians and forced them to retreat across the Araks river back to Persia. On 28 September of the same year Madatov was made lieutenant general.

He concluded his career fighting the Turks once again on the Danube during the Russo-Turkish War. On September 4, 1829, two days after the signing of a peace treaty that ended the war, Madatov died from a pulmonary disease, which was sharply aggravated as a result of the burdens of marching during the war. His remains are interred at the Alexander Nevsky Lavra in Saint Petersburg.
