= Saleem Khan =

Saleem Khan may refer to:

- Saleem Khan, Khyber Pakhtunkhwa
- Saleem Khan (politician)
- Muhammad Saleem Khan

== See also ==
- Salim Khan, Indian actor, film producer and screenwriter
- Salim Khan (disambiguation)
