= Morteza Qoli Khan (Safavid governor) =

- میرزا قلی‌خان

Governor of Kakheti
- In office 1651–?
- Monarch: Abbas II of Persia
- Succeeded by: Abbas Qoli-Khan

Governor of Karabakh-Ganja
- In office 1651–1664
- Monarch: Abbas II of Persia
- Preceded by: Mohammad-Qoli Khan Qajar (2nd term)
- Succeeded by: Oghurlu Khan

Personal details
- Tribe: Qajar
- Branch: Ziyadoghlu

Military service
- Allegiance: Safavid Iran

Morteza Qoli Khan (Persian: میرزا قلی‌خان) was an Iranian official of Turkoman origin, who served as beglerbeg (governor) of Kakheti in Georgia from 1651. Commencing in the same year, he concurrently undertook the governorship of Karabakh-Ganja. Morteza Qoli Khan was a member of the Ziyadoghlu branch of the Qajar tribe.
