= Piri Beg Qajar =

16th-century Iranian military officer from the Turkoman Qajar tribe

Piri Beg Qajar was an early 16th-century Iranian military officer and official from the Turkoman Qajar tribe, who served under Safavid Shah ("King") Ismail I (r. 1501-1524). He fought at the decisive Battle of Sarur in 1501 against the Ak Koyunlu; for his apparent valor, he was given an honorary name by Ismail I. In the same year, Piri Beg Qajar was appointed as the first Safavid governor (hakem) of Karabakh–Ganja.

Piri Beg Qajar is apparently one of only two attested individuals from the Qajar tribe (the other one being Acheh Soltan Qajar) who held stature during Ismail I's rule. Nevertheless, neither Piri Beg nor Acheh Soltan were leading amirs "in the sense of holding high office in the early Safavid administration".

== Sources ==
- Daniel, Elton L., ed. (2002). Society and Culture in Qajar Iran: Studies in Honor of Hafez Farmayan. Costa Mesa, California: Mazda Publishers. ISBN 978-1568591384.
- Floor, Willem M. (2008). Titles and Emoluments in Safavid Iran: A Third Manual of Safavid Administration, by Mirza Naqi Nasiri. Washington, DC: Mage Publishers. ISBN 978-1933823232.

Preceded by Office created	Governor of Karabakh–Ganja; 1501–1512?	Succeeded by Hossein Beg Ustajlu
