= Shahverdi Sultan =

Safavid military leader (16th century)

Governor of Qarabagh
- In office 1554–1556
- Monarch: Tahmasp I
- Succeeded by: Ibrahim Sultan Ziyadoghlu Qajar

Personal details
- Born: 1508 Ganja, Safavid Iran
- Died: 1556 (aged 47–48) Garisi, Kingdom of Kartli
- Children: Ibrahim Sultan; Yusuf Khalifa

Gokcheh Sultan Ziyadoghlu Qajar (Persian: گکچه سلطان زیاداوغلی قاجار), better known as Shahverdi Sultan (شاهوردی سلطان), was a Safavid military leader of Turkoman origin, who served as the governor of Karabakh and Ganja during the reign of Shah Tahmasp I (r. 1524–1576).

== Biography ==
Shahverdi Sultan belonged to the Ziyadoghlu family, a family which belonged to Qajar tribe, and thus part of the Qizilbash. Shahverdi Sultan's family had originally been dispatched to govern Karabakh in southern Arran. In 1547, Shahverdi Sultan was appointed as the guardian (lala) of the Safavid prince Ismail Mirza and co-governor of Shirvan with the latter. Shahverdi Sultan, along with Shah Tahmasp I's brother-in-law, Abdollah Khan Ustajlu, organized an expedition against Burhan Ali, a nephew of Tahmasp I and pretender to the Shirvanshah crown. The following year, during the Ottoman–Safavid War of 1532–1555, Shahverdi Sultan and Ismail Mirza, with an army of 7,000 soldiers, sacked the important neighboring Ottoman stronghold of Kars.

In 1554, Shahverdi Sultan was appointed governor of the Karabakh beglerbeylik and of its administrative center, Ganja, by Tahmasp I. A year later, in 1555, he was immediately dispatched by Tahmasp I to secure the eastern Georgian kingdoms of Kartli and Kakheti, which had been recognized as Iranian domains per the ratified Peace of Amasya with the Ottoman Empire. Head of the Iranian army as sent by Tahmasp towards Kartli, Shahverdi Sultan's army met those of the Georgian king Luarsab I and his son Simon at Garisi (present-day Tetritsqaro), where a major battle culminated. Shahverdi Sultan was killed during the encounter, whilst his army were routed at Garisi. Luarsab, however, also died in battle.

Shahverdi Sultan had a son named Khalil Khan Ziyadoghlu, whose son, Mohammad Khan Ziyadoghlu, also served as the governor of Ganja.

== Sources ==
- Ghereghlou, Kioumars (2016). "ESMĀʿIL II". Encyclopaedia Iranica.
- Floor, Willem M. (2008). Titles and Emoluments in Safavid Iran: A Third Manual of Safavid Administration, by Mirza Naqi Nasiri. Washington, DC: Mage Publishers. pp. 175, 284. ISBN 978-1933823232.
- Mikaberidze, Alexander (2015). Historical Dictionary of Georgia (2 ed.). Rowman & Littlefield. ISBN 978-1-44224-146-6.
- Sümer, F. (1997). "Kādjār". E.J. Brill's First Encyclopaedia of Islam, Volume IV: IRAN-KHA. Leiden: BRILL. pp. 387–399. ISBN 90-04-05745-5.
- Bosworth, C. E. (2000). "GANJA". Encyclopaedia Iranica, Vol. X, Fasc. 3. pp. 282–283.
