= Shamshadil =

Turkic sultanate in Caucasus

- 1747–1813
- Political map of the eastern part of the Southern Caucasus between 1795–1801. Shamshadil is located in the southern part of the Kingdom of Kartli-Kakheti
- Status: Sultanate
- Capital: Oksuzlu
- Common languages: Persian, Azerbaijani, Armenian
- Religion: Islam
- History
  - Established: 1747
  - Disestablished: 1813
Preceded by	Succeeded by
Afsharid Iran	Russian Empire

Shamshadil (also spelled Shams al-Din or Shamshadin) was a sultanate (a semi-autonomous district governed by a military commander) in the South Caucasus established in 1747. It was located in what is now northeastern Armenia and northwestern Azerbaijan.

== Background ==
During the Safavid period, Shamshadil was part of the Karabakh province, which was governed by the Ziyadoghlu branch of the Qajar tribe. After Nader repelled the Ottomans from the area in 1735, he appointed Ughurlu Khan Ziyadoghlu Qajar as its khan. The latter was later the only khan who did not support Nader when he petitioned to become shah (king) of Iran at the assembly at the Mughan plain. This made Nader Shah split the Karabakh province in order to curtail the power of the Qajars. The Zangezur district was given to the beglerbegi (governor-general) of Tabriz; the autonomy of the Armenian Melikdoms was restored, and Borchalu, the Kazakh sultanate and Shamshadil were given to the Georgian king Teimuraz II (r. 1732–1762). Ughurlu Khan was thus only left with Ganja and its surroundings.

Following Nader Shah's assassination in 1747, Iran fell into turmoil, especially in the South Caucasus. There the Georgians and local khans fought over land. With no central authority left in Iran, Heraclius II (r. 1762–1798), the king of Eastern Georgia (Kartli-Kakheti), and the khans, district aqalars (grandees) and soltans (military commander of a district) attempted to preserve their recent freedom by collaborating with or against their neighbours. The area soon split into multiple semi-autonomous khanates and districts, such as the Ganja Khanate. Shamshadil was amongst the sultanates that emerged during this period.

== History ==
Although some khans and soltans had shown interest in receiving Russian protection, Javad Khan of Ganja staunchly opposed it. He remained loyal to the shah and planned to defy any Russian intrusion. When Javad Khan was made aware of the gradual Russian expansion into the neighboring districts, he had his son Hossein Qoli Aqa relocate the Tatar and Armenian families of Shamshadil to Ganja. Javad Khan also plundered the district, seizing livestock and forcing many locals to flee to Georgia. In response, the Russian general Karl Knorring sent a diplomat named Gorgin Beg to Javad Khan, asking him to stop his hostility, as Shamshadil was Georgian land and that it had only been controlled by Ganja due to being granted by Agha Mohammad Khan Qajar. Javad Khan responded by saying that while Shamshadil had occasionally been detached from Ganja, it had still been part of it for centuries. He also added that he desired good relations with his neighbour. Knorring responded back, by repeating that the district belongs to Georgia, which was now part of Russia.

On 4 June, 1802, Knorring sent a Russian force under Lazarev into Shamshadil. Lazarev and his men only had supplies to last until June 13, and thus had hoped to acquire some from the Armenian villages bordering Ganja. However, when he reached the border on June 8, he discovered that 29 out of 33 Armenian and Tatar villages, which amounted to 1,900 families, had been moved to Ganja. Recognizing his dangerous position, Lazarev and his men withdrew into the Kazakh sultanate and Borchalu. Shamshadil was amongst the lands that Iran ceded to Russia by agreeing to the Treaty of Gulistan in 1813.

Under Russian rule, the Kazakh uezd of the Elizavetpol Governorate was frequently called Kazakh-Shamshadin, since the southern half of the uezd was still known as Shamshadin. The name was preserved in the Soviet period as the Shamshadin District of the Armenian SSR, which was renamed Tavush in 1990 and later abolished and made a part of the modern-day Tavush Province of Armenia.

== Sources ==
- Bournoutian, George (2016). "Prelude to War: The Russian Siege and Storming of the Fortress of Ganjeh, 1803–4". Iranian Studies. 50 (1). Taylor & Francis: 107–124.
- Bournoutian, George (2021). From the Kur to the Aras: A Military History of Russia's Move into the South Caucasus and the First Russo-Iranian War, 1801–1813. Brill. ISBN 978-9004445154.
- Hakobyan, Tʻ. Kh.; Melikʻ-Bakhshyan, St. T.; Barseghyan, H. Kh. (1998). "Shamshadin". Hayastani ev harakitsʻ shrjanneri teghanunneri baṛaran [Dictionary of toponymy of Armenia and adjacent territories] (in Armenian). Vol. 4. Yerevan State University. p. 72.
