= Salim Khan Shams al-Dinlu =

17th-century Safavid military leader

Salim Khan Shams al-Dinlu was an early 17th-century Safavid military leader and official of Turkoman origin. A member of the Shams al-Dinlu tribe, of which he was the leader for many years, he served as the governor (hakem) of Akhaltsikhe (Akhesqeh, also spelled as Akheshkheh), the provincial capital of Samtskhe (also known as Meskheti, Masq, or Meshkhia), from 1623 to 1627. In addition to this position, he also served as the governor of the Shams al-Dinlu tribal district in the Karabagh Province for several years. His son Ismail (Esma'il) succeeded him in 1629 as both the head of the tribe and the governor of the Shams al-Dinlu district.

== Sources ==
- Floor, Willem (2001). Safavid Government Institutions. Costa Mesa, California: Mazda Publishers. pp. 85–86. ISBN 978-1568591353.
- Floor, Willem M. (2008). Titles and Emoluments in Safavid Iran: A Third Manual of Safavid Administration, by Mirza Naqi Nasiri. Washington, DC: Mage Publishers. pp. 140, 279. ISBN 978-1933823232.
- Maeda, Hirotake (2006). "The forced migrations and reorganisation of the regional order in the Caucasus by Safavid Iran: Preconditions and developments described by Fazli Khuzani". In Ieda, Osamu; Uyama, Tomohiko (eds.). Reconstruction and interaction of Slavic Eurasia and its neighbouring worlds (PDF). Slavic Eurasian Studies, No.10. Sapporo: Slavic Research Centre, Hokkaido University. pp. 243–244. ISBN 4938637391.

Preceded by Ottoman rule	Governor of Akhaltsikhe; 1623–1627	Succeeded by Shamsi Khan Qazaqlar (aka, Shams al-Din Qazaqlar)
