= Kazakh sultanate =

Former state in the Caucasus

Kazakh Sultanate
- 1605–1801
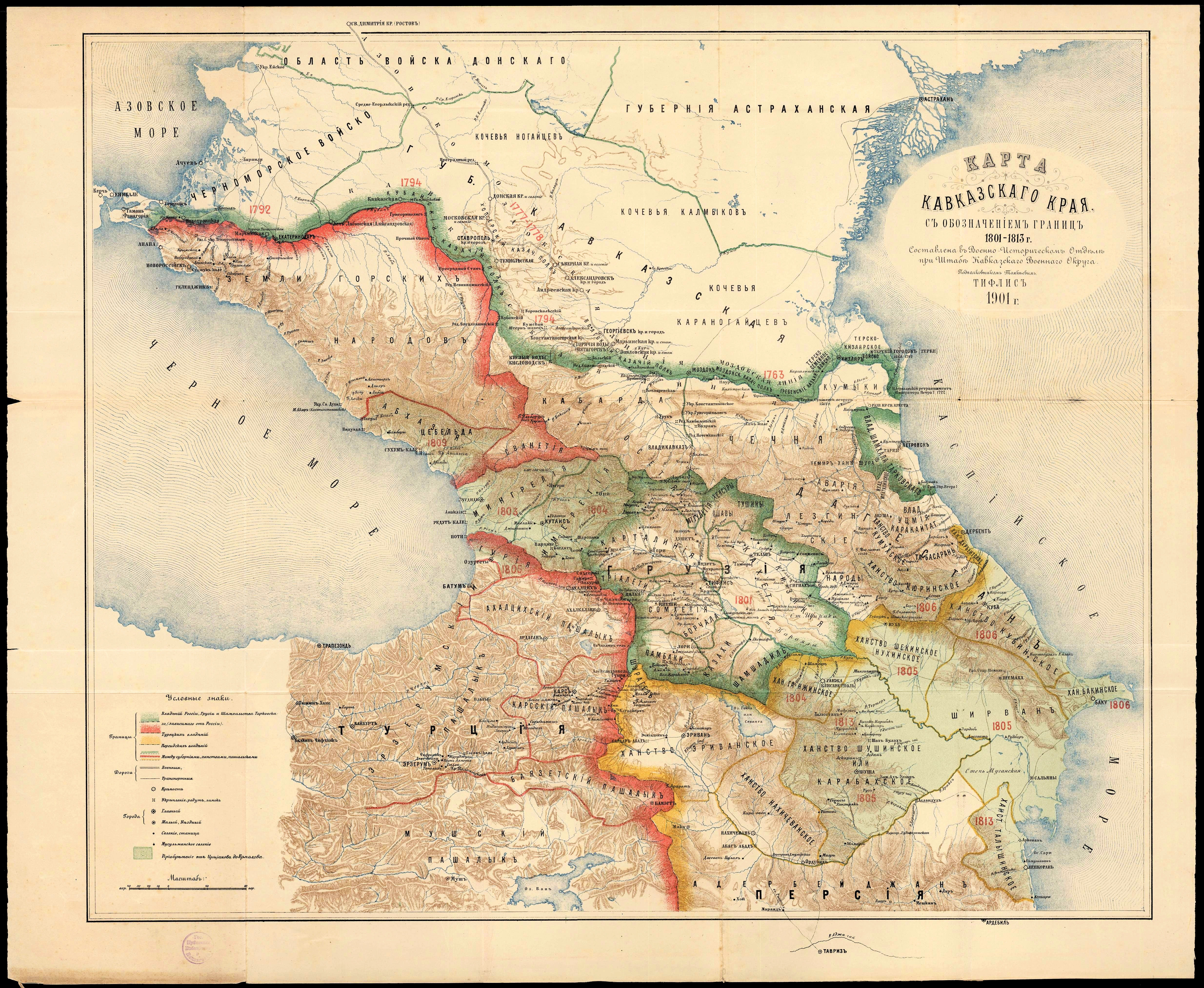
- Map of countries in the Caucasus including Kazakh sultanate in 1801
- Status: sultanate
- Capital: Gazakh
- Official languages: Persian (official); Azerbaijani; Armenian; Georgian
- Religion: Islam; Christianity
- Government: Monarchy
- History
  - Established: 1605
  - Disestablished: 1801
Preceded by	Succeeded by
Safavid Iran	Russian Empire
- Today part of: Azerbaijan

Kazakh sultanate or Gazakh sultanate was established at the beginning of the 17th century. During the Safavid Empire, it was part of the Karabakh principality. In 1605, by the decree of Abbas the Great, Shamsaddin sultan of Kazakh was given the rank of Khan.

The rulers of the Kazakh sultanate also held the title of Sultan using monarchy as a form power. 3 clans held the power in the Kazakh sultanate in different period of time. The first rulers were from "Kazakhli" (or "Gazakhli") or "Algazakhli", later known as Shikhlinsky clan.

During the Ottoman period, a total of 256 villages came under the control of the Kazakh Sultanate, including 205 villages of the Kazakh Sanjag connected to the Tiflis province and 51 villages of the Ganja-Karabakh province.

In 1801, the Kazakh Sultanate was annexed to Russian Empire together with the Sultanates of Borchaly, Shamshadil and Shoragel. Later the Sultanate's territories became part of the administrative unit in the Russian Empire labeled as Kazakh Uyezd.

== Sultans ==
- Nazar khan
- Shamsaddin khan
- Miralbey
- Subhanverdi khan
- Panakh aga Salahly
- Ali aga Salahly
- Mustafa aga Arif

== See also ==
- Treaty of Gulistan
- Treaty of Turkmenchay
- South Caucasus
- Shamshadil sultanate
- Shoragel sultanate
- Khanates of the Caucasus
- Azerbaijan Democratic Republic
