= Battle of Ganja (1826) =

Part of the Russo-Persian War

- Part of the Russo-Persian War of 1826–1828
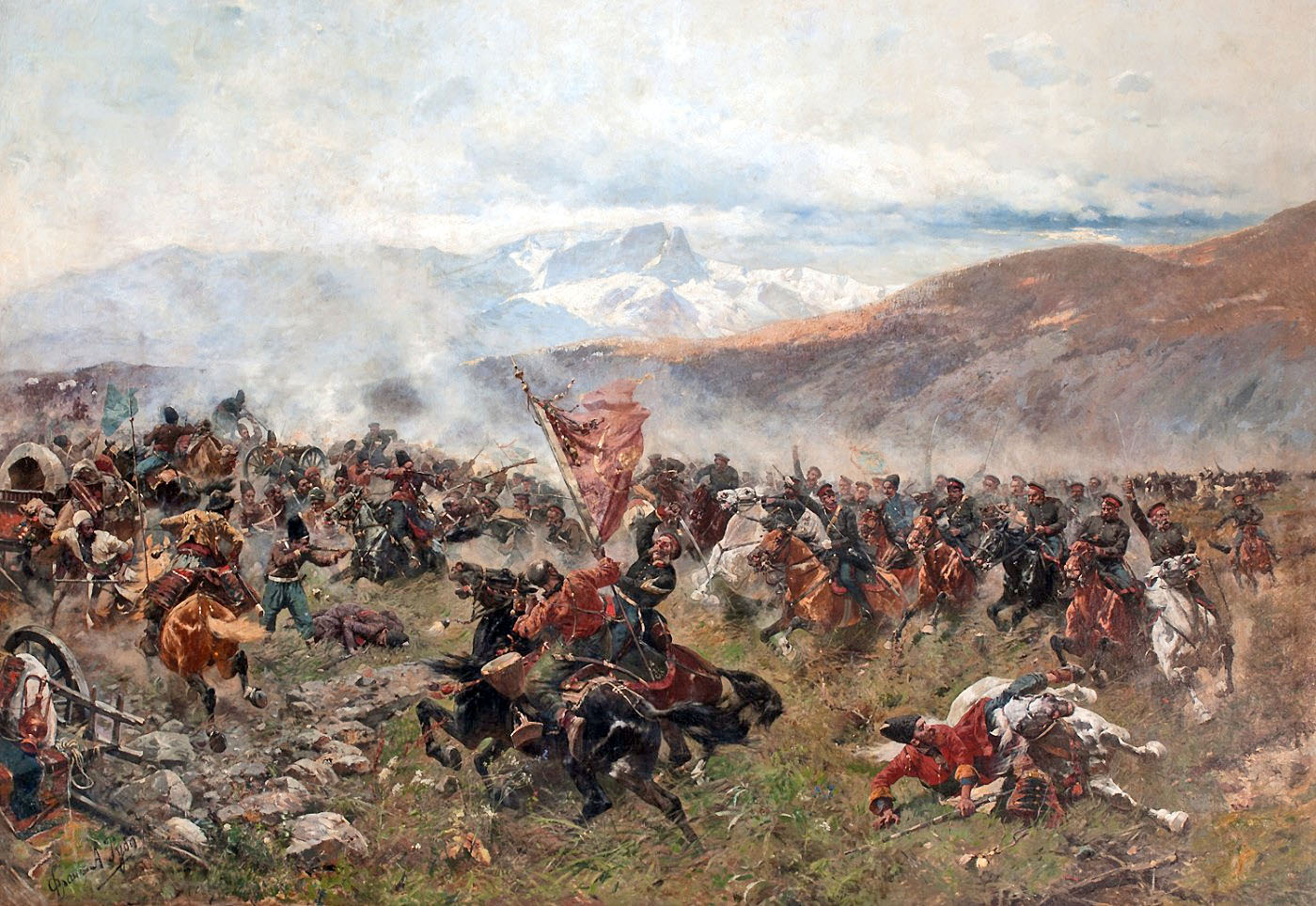
- Painting of the battle, by Franz Roubaud
Date	25 September 1826
Location	Ganja (present-day Republic of Azerbaijan)
Result	Russian victory

Belligerents
Russian Empire	Qajar Iran

Commanders and leaders
Ivan Paskevich	Abbas Mirza

Strength
15,000	30,000

Casualties and losses
295	2,000 killed 1,100 captured 3,100 total casualties (Rus. estimate)

The Battle of Ganja or Elisavetpol (also Elizabethpol, Yelisavetpol, &c.) took place on 25 September 1826^{NS}/13 September 1826^{OS}, during the Russo-Persian War of 1826–1828.

Crown prince and commander-in-chief Abbas Mirza had launched a successful campaign in the summer of 1826, which resulted in the recapture of many of the territories that were lost to the Russians by virtue of the Treaty of Gulistan (1813). Noticing the approach of the Iranian army, many of the locals that had recently come under formal Russian jurisdiction, quickly switched sides. Amongst the swiftly recaptured territories by the Iranians were the important cities of Baku, Lankaran and Quba.

Then Russian commander-in-chief in the Caucasus, Aleksey Yermolov, convinced that he had insufficient resources to battle the Iranians, ordered for the withdrawal from Elisavetpol (Ganja), which was thus retaken as well.

Yermolov's replacement, Ivan Paskevich, now with additional resources, started the counteroffensive. At Ganja, in late September 1826, the Iranian and Russian armies met, and Abbas Mirza and his men were defeated. As a result, the Iranian army was forced to retreat across the Aras river.

== Sources ==
- Axworthy, Michael (2010). A History of Iran: Empire of the Mind. Basic Books. ISBN 978-0465019205.
- Tucker, Spencer C., ed. (2010). A Global Chronology of Conflict: From the Ancient World to the Modern Middle East. ABC-CLIO. ISBN 978-1851096725.
- Shefov, Nikolay (2002). Битвы России. Военно-историческая библиотека. Moscow: AST. ISBN 5-17-010649-1.
