= Safavid Karabakh =

Province of Safavid Iran

Province of Karabakh Velāyat-e Qarabagh
- 1501–1736
- The administrative divisions of Safavid Iran in the South Caucasus
- Status: Province of Safavid Iran
- Capital: Ganja
- Government: Province
Preceded by	Succeeded by
Aq Qoyunlu	Afsharid Iran
- Today part of: Armenia; Azerbaijan; Georgia

The province of Karabakh (also spelled Qarabagh; Persian: ولایت قره باغ, romanized: Velāyat-e Qarabāgh) was a north-western province of the Safavid Iran, centered on the geographic region of Karabakh.

The governorship of Karabakh was generally held by a member of the Qajars, one of the Qizilbash tribes. Its highlands were controlled by the five Armenian melikdoms.

== History ==
These provinces were headed by the shah's governors-general, who were called beglarbegs, or at other times hakems. The main urban center of the province of Karabakh was the city of Ganja. The first Safavid governor of Karabakh (hakem) was Piri Beg Qajar, and was appointed as such in 1501. Shahverdi-Sultan, from the Ziyadoglu clan of the Qajar tribe, was appointed by Shah Tahmasp I (r. 1524-1576) in 1554.

== Administration ==
Under the Safavids, Karabakh was part of the mamalek ("state lands"), a form of the iqta' that had been used by the Buyid dynasty (934–1062). It was a type of prebendalism in which lands were given away as fiefs to tribal military forces, thus demonstrating the Safavids' reliance on them to protect the country. Due to its more exposed position as a frontier province, Qarabagh continued to remain mamalek land to maintain more security, in contrast to some other provinces which were transformed into khasseh ("crown lands"). The Qizilbash chieftains were rewarded with mamalek land in exchange for their military alertness and for paying limited defined sum every year. The governorship of Karabakh was generally held by a member of the Qizilbash Qajar tribe.

The plains of Karabakh were dominated by nomadic Turkic tribes, who moved to the hillsides in search of suitable pastures throughout the summer. The highlands of Karabakh were dominated by Armenian meliks (princes), who had established five melikdoms (Dizak, Gulistan, Jraberd, Khachen and Varanda) that ruled in Karabakh from the 16th-century to the 18th-century. These Armenian-ruled principalities, which upheld the notion of Armenian statehood, were used by the Safavids to fight the Ottoman Empire.

In the end of the Safavid era, the Karabakh Province consisted of the districts of Zagam, Barda, Akhtabad, Javanshir, Bargushat, Qara-Aghach (Q'araghaji in Signagi municipality), Lori-Pambak, Arasbar-Bayazidlu and Somay-Tergever.

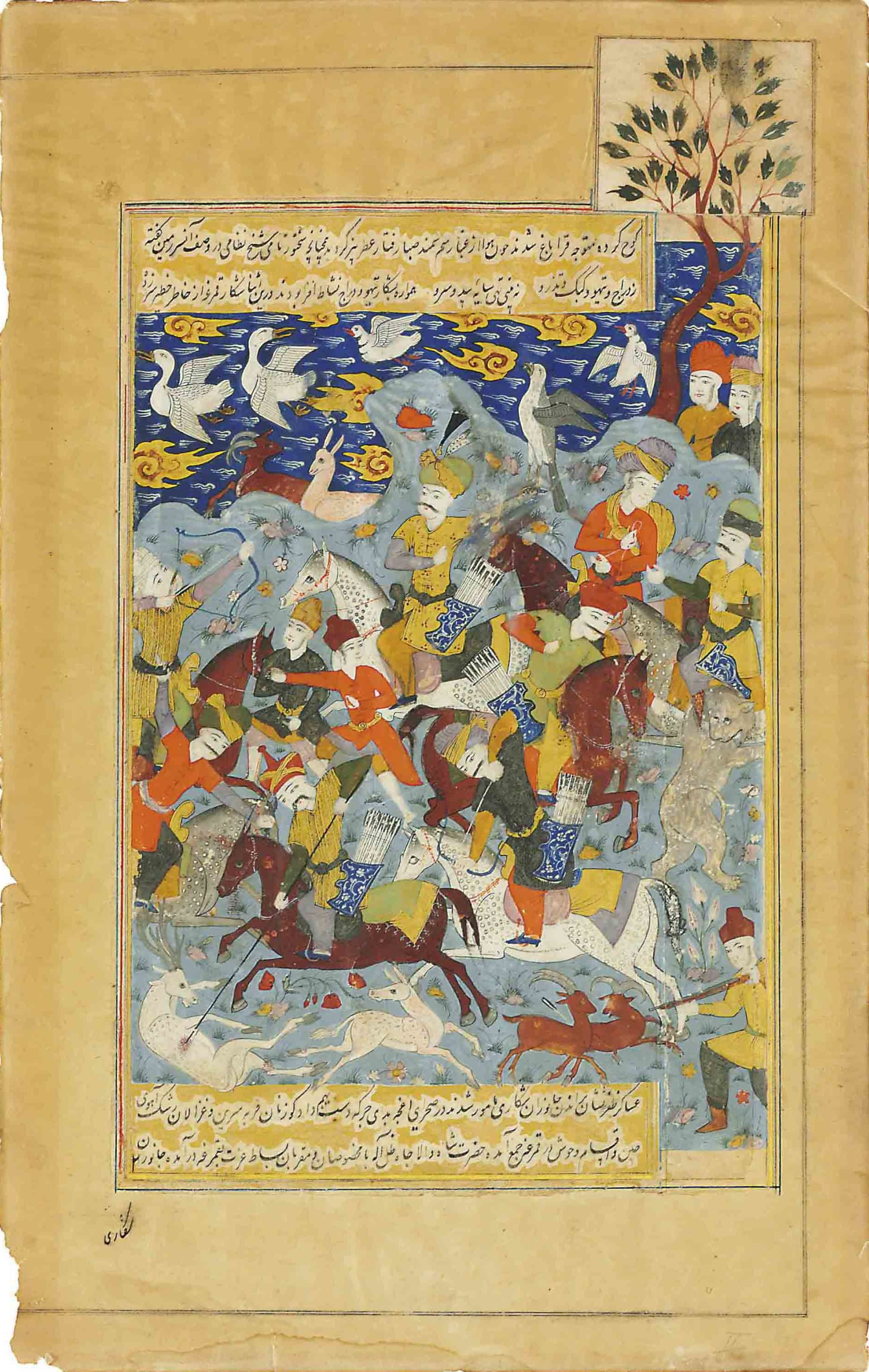
Persian miniature depicting Shah Abbas the Great hunting in Karabakh. From an illustrated history created in 17th-century Safavid Iran

== List of governors ==
This is a list of the known figures who governed Karabakh or parts of it. Beglerbegi and hakem were administrative titles designating the governor.

Date	Governor	Observations
1501–1512?	Piri Beg Qajar	Hakem of Karabakh
1526	Hoseyn Beg Ustajlu	Hakem of Karabakh
1528	Ya'qub Soltan Qajar	Hakem of Karabakh
1551–1556	Shahverdi Soltan Qajar	Beglerbegi of Karabakh
1554–1564	Shahverdi Khan Soltan Ziyadoghlu	Hakem of Karabakh
1564–1568–?	Ebrahim Beg Ziyadoghlu Qajar	Beglerbegi of Karabakh and Ganja
1575	Yusof Khalifeh Ziyadoghlu	
1576	Paykar Khan Igirmi Durt	Hakem of Ganja and amir al-omara of Karabakh
1576–1588	Emamqoli Beg Qajar	Hakem of Karabakh and Ganja
1588–1590	Mohammad Khan Ziyadoghlu Qajar	Beglerbegi of Karabakh
1589–1605	None	Ottoman occupation
1605–1606	Hoseyn Khan Ziyadoghlu Qajar	Beglerbegi of Karabakh
1606–1616	Mohammad Khan Ziyadoghlu Qajar	Beglerbegi of Karabakh
1616–1627	Mohammad-Qoli Khan Qajar	Beglerbegi of Karabakh
1627–1633	Daud Khan Undiladze	Beglerbegi of Karabakh
1633–?	Mohammad-Qoli Khan Qajar (2nd term)	Beglerbegi of Karabakh
1651–1664	Mortezaqoli Khan Ziyadoghlu	Beglerbegi of Karabakh
1664–?	Oghurlu Khan	Beglerbegi of Karabakh
1694	Abbas Qoli-Khan	Beglerbegi of Karabakh and Hakem of Kakhetia
1695	Kalb Ali Khan Ziyadoghlu	Beglerbegi of Karabakh and Hakem of Kakhetia
?–1723–?	Constantine II of Kakheti	Beglerbegi of Karabakh

== Sources ==
- Bournoutian, George (2021). From the Kur to the Aras: A Military History of Russia's Move into the South Caucasus and the First Russo-Iranian War, 1801–1813. Brill. ISBN 978-9004445154.
- Floor, Willem (2008). Titles and Emoluments in Safavid Iran: A Third Manual of Safavid Administration, by Mirza Naqi Nasiri. Washington, D.C.: Mage Publishers. ISBN 978-1933823232.
- Floor, Willem (2021). "The Safavid court and government". In Matthee, Rudi (ed.). The Safavid World. Routledge. pp. 203–224.
- Matthee, Rudi (2011). Persia in Crisis: Safavid Decline and the Fall of Isfahan. I.B.Tauris. ISBN 978-0857731814.
- Reid, James J. (1978). "The Qajar Uymaq in the Safavid Period, 1500-1722". Iranian Studies. 11 (1/4). Taylor & Francis: 117–143. doi:10.1080/00210867808701542. JSTOR 4310299. (registration required)
- Tsibenko, Veronika (2018). "Karabakh, Nagorno". In Fleet, Kate; Krämer, Gudrun; Matringe, Denis; Nawas, John; Rowson, Everett (eds.). Encyclopaedia of Islam (3rd ed.). Brill Online. ISSN 1873-9830.
