= Abbas Qoli-Khan =

Governor of Kakheti
- In office 1688–1694
- Monarchs: Suleiman I of Persia, Soltan Hoseyn
- Preceded by: Morteza Qoli Khan
- Succeeded by: Qalb-Ali Khan

Personal details
- Relatives: Qalb-Ali Khan (brother)
- Tribe: Qajar
- Branch: Ziyadoghlu

Military service
- Allegiance: Safavid Iran

Abbas-qoli Khan (Persian: عباس‌قلی خان) was a 17th-century Safavid official in the eastern Caucasus.

Abbās-qoli Khan, known for his wealth and opulence, had served as beglarbeg of Ganja under the shah Suleiman I of Persia before being appointed as khan of Kakheti in eastern Georgia in 1688. Residing at Qara-Aghac in Kakheti, Abbās-qoli Khan was tasked with keeping an eye on Heraclius I (Nazar Ali Khan), a vassal Georgian ruler of neighboring Kartli, who had been opposed by George XI (Gorjin Khan). Abbas-qoli Khan's fortunes reversed as George was able to stage comeback and place Heraclius under siege at Tiflis in 1691. In 1694, following the death of Shah Suleiman, the khan was accused by his rivals of incompetence and intriguing with George XI against Heraclius I. At the order of Shah Sultan Husayn, Heraclius arrested Abbas-qoli Khan, confiscated his possessions, and escorted him under guard to Isfahan. The government of Kakheti was taken over by his brother Qalb-Ali Khan. Abbas-qoli Khan's later fate is not recorded.

== See also ==
- Ughurlu Khan I
- Ganja Khanate
- Safavid Karabakh
