= Shoragel sultanate =

Turkic sultanate in the Caucasus

The Sultanate of Shoragel
- around 1747–1805
- Status: Sultanate
- Religion: Islam
- Government: Absolute monarchy
- History
  - Established: around 1747
  - Disestablished: 1805

Area
  - Total: 1,037.91 km^{2} (400.74 sq mi)
Preceded by	Succeeded by
Afsharid dynasty	Russian Empire
- Today part of: Armenia

Shoragel, Shuragel, Shorayel, or the Sultanate of Shoragel was a sultanate established around 1747, in the period of Afsharid dynasty in Persia, and it often was part of the Erivan Khanate. Its area was 1037.91 versts (1181.16 km²).

== History ==
The sultanate was located in the north-west of the Erivan khanate at the foot of Aragats mountain. The sultanate was surrounded by the mountains separating the Kartli-Kakheti kingdom from the north, the Talyn and Seyidli-Agsaqqalli districts from the south, and the Pambek province and Aparan districts from the east. The Akhurayan River separated the Shorayel sultanate from the Kars pashalyk. The center of the sultanate was Artik.

The “Review Book of Erivan Province” shows the existence of 172 villages in Shoragel Sanjak (together with Pambak Province). According to the information given during the reign of Nadir Shah, there were 109 villages in Shoragel district as a part of Erivan khanate.

In 1804, Russian troops invaded Shoragel resulting in the exodus of large portion of the local Muslim population and the final abolition of the Shoragel sultanate in 1805. Abandoned villages were eventually inhabited by the Armenian population resettled from Ottoman Empire. Those records were mentioned three decades later in the "Review of Russian possessions beyond the Caucasus" printed by Russian State Department for External Trade in 1836.

Part of the Shoragel residents, mainly Karapapakh Turks, left their lands in the wake of the Russo-Turkish war in 1807 and found refuge in the territories of Erivan khanate and Kars pashalyk.

== Rulers ==
- Budaq sultan is the last ruler of the Shoragel sultanate. On October 20, 1805, he signed a document with Pavel Tsitsianov on Shoragel's permanent subordination to Russia in Ganja city. Budag sultan had three sons named Gara Mohammad bey, Hamid bey, Khalil bey.

== See also ==
- Khanates of the Caucasus
