= Paykar Khan Igirmi Durt =

16th-17th century Qizilbash chieftain

Paykar Khān Igīrmī Dūrt (Persian: پیکر خان ایگیرمی‌دورت; Azerbaijani: Peykər xan İyirmidörd) was a Qizilbash chieftain in the service of Safavid Persia in the late 16th and early 17th centuries. His career flourished in the southeastern Caucasus, where he ran the governments of Barda and Kakheti on behalf of Shah Abbas I until being overthrown in a Georgian uprising in 1625.

== Governor ==
Paykar Beg, the future khan, was a leader of the Turkic tribe of Igirmi Durt (lit. 'twenty four'), who vied with other Qizilbash factions over the influence in Karabakh. On the order of Shah Ismail II, Paykar killed his cousin Yusof Khalife ibn Shahverdi Khan Ziyadoghlu, beglarbeg of Karabakh, and Yūsof's mother and brothers, expecting appointment as beglarbeg. Ismail, however, gave the position to a member of the rival Qajar clan.

Paykar rose to influence in 1608, when Shah Abbas I appointed him governor of Barda. Around 1620, he was, further, given the governorship of Kakheti, a neighboring Georgian kingdom, which the shah sought to bring under his full control. On this occasion, Abbas gave to Paykar in marriage Lela (Fatma Sultan Begum), a royal princess from another Georgian kingdom, that of Kartli, whom the shah dismissed from his harem after having her brother, King Luarsab II, executed.

On his appointment in Kakheti, Paykar Khan settled in the fortress of Qarlanquch (Khornabuji) where he built a town with fine homes and bathes. Following the shah's order, he brought some 15,000 households of Igirmi Durt Imuru, Zolqadar, Solayman Hajlu, and Kurds of Azerbaijan for resettlement in Kakheti. The country lay depopulated and in ruins; tens of thousands of Georgians had been deported to the remote provinces of the Safavid empire and those who remained hid in the forests and mountains. Paykar Khan's vizier was Fazli Isfahani Khuzani, who subsequently wrote the chronicle Afżal al-tawārikh, an important source for the history of Shah Abbas's campaigns in the Caucasus and Georgian affairs.

== Downfall ==
Paykar Khan's rule in Kakheti was brought to an end, in 1625, by the rebellion of the shah's Georgian officer Giorgi Saakadze (Murav-Beg), who had killed the Safavid commander Qarachaqay Khan and destroyed his army camp at the battle of Martkopi. He was in alliance with Zurab, Duke of Aragvi, whom Saakadze had promised the hand of Lela, Paykar Khan's wife. Paykar Khan was at this time on a mission to eliminate the pockets of Georgian refugees in the forests of Kakheti. On hearing the news that the Georgian troops were advancing towards Qarlanquch, he hastily returned to his headquarters and fled with his wife and tribe. They succeeded in crossing the Kura river safely, but lost many of fellow clansmen, much cattle, and booty to the pursuing Georgians, who carried their raid far into Ganja and Karabakh.
