= Dmitry Lisanevich =

General of the Imperial Russian Army

- Дмитрий Тихонович Лисаневич
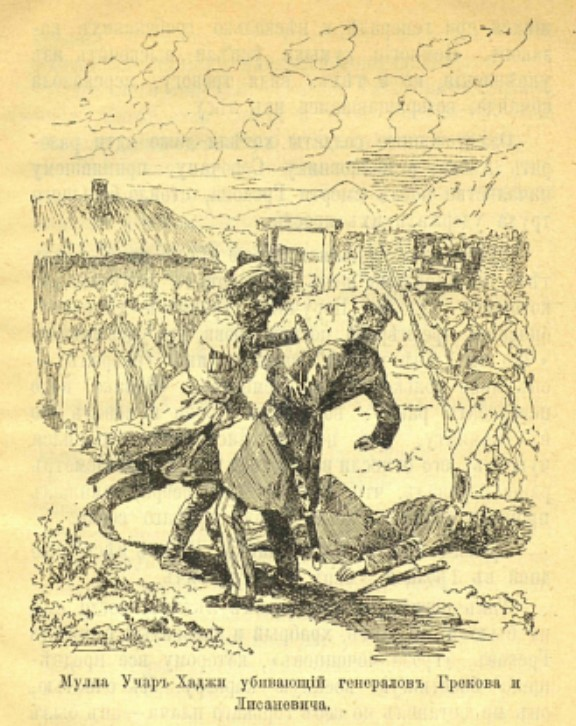
- Death of Lisanevich by Uchar-hadji (1899 illustration)
- Born: 1778; Voronezh, Russian Empire
- Died: July 1825 (aged 46–47); Caucasus, Russian Empire
- Military career
- Allegiance: Russian Empire
- Commands: 17th Jaeger Corps; 9th Jaeger Corps; 6th Infantry Division; North Caucasus Line
- Conflicts: Persian Expedition of 1796; Russo-Persian War; Russo-Turkish War; Caucasian War
- Awards: Order of St. George; Order of Saint Vladimir; Golden Weapon for Bravery

Dmitry Tikhonovich Lisanevich (Russian: Дмитрий Тихонович Лисаневич, 1778 – 1825) was a prominent general of Imperial Russian Army. He is best known for negotiation of The Treaty of Kurakchay and killing of Ibrahim Khalil Khan of Karabakh.

== Life ==
Born in 1778 in a poor noble family of the Voronezh province; except for Russian language, he was not educated in anything. He entered military service in 1793 as a private in the Kuban Jaeger Corps, in whose ranks he participated in the Persian expedition of 1796, distinguished himself in the capture of Derbent and was promoted to officer for the battle near Alpan.

After the disbandment of the Kuban Jaeger Corps, Lisanevich was enrolled in the 17th Jaeger Regiment, with which he moved to Georgia and here, under the command of Pavel Tsitsianov, Ivan Lazarev and Pavel Karyagin, he enrolled in an excellent military school. In 1803 he was already a major, and in 1804 for the assault on Ganja, during which, commanding a battalion with the rank of lieutenant colonel, he was the first to climb the city wall, was awarded the Order of St. George of the 4th degree. The capture of Ganja played an important role in accelerating the invasion of the Caucasian khanates by Russia. Back in early 1804, General Tsitsianov sent Lisanevich to Ibrahim Khalil Khan and demanded that transfer to Russian subordination. Ibrahim Khalil Khan asked Tsitsianov for military assistance to prevent the attack of Iranian troops and promised to help and remain loyal to Russia. At his request, Tsitsianov sent a team to Karabakh, led by Lisanevich. Tsitsianov set up camp on the Kurakchay River near Ganja. Ibrahim Khalil Khan came here with his sons Mammad Hasan agha, Mehdigulu Khan, Khanlar agha and other nobles of Karabakh.

On April 3, 1805, Lisanevich was appointed commander of the 17th Jaeger Regiment, on April 23, 1806, he was promoted to lieutenant colonel and on December 12, 1807 - to colonel.

Lisanevich was involved in killing of Ibrahim Khalil Khan in 1806. Tsitsianov's death on 20 February 1806 in Baku and the breakup of the Russian offensive persuaded Ibrahim Khalil Khan, in the summer of 1806, to repudiate his allegiance to the Russians, and resubmit himself to the shah; he then asked the shah for aid in ousting the Russian garrison. As the Persian army approached Shusha, Ibrahim Khan left the fortress and camped outside. On 12 June 1806, the Russians under the command of Lisanevich, instigated by Ibrahim Khalil Khan's grandson and fearful of their own vulnerability, attacked the camp and killed Ibrahim Khan, one of his wives, a daughter, and his youngest son. Except for him being a traitor, Lisanevich didn't give any justification for the killing. As a result Lisanevich was transferred elsewhere.

Appointed the chief of the 9th Jaeger Regiment, Lisanevich took a prominent part in the conquest of Imeretia, in 1810 he was a hero of the victory at Akhalkalaki and in the same year with two Jaeger companies pacified the Quba Khanate and rescued the Russian troops besieged in Quba. For these deeds he was awarded the Order of St. Vladimir 3rd degree, the rank of major general and a gold saber with the inscription "For Bravery" and diamond jewelry (July 9, 1811). He was nicknamed Dəli Mayor ("Mad Major" in Azerbaijani) by locals for his temper. On October 22, 1810 he was promoted to major general.

Taking advantage of his free time from service, Lisanevich traveled, under an assumed name, accompanied by an interpreter, most of France and got acquainted with the laws and its internal administration. Upon his return from Maubeuge to Russia, he was appointed head of the 7th Infantry Division, and in September 1824, by the personal selection of Emperor Alexander I, he became commander of the troops on the Caucasian line and the head of the 22nd Infantry Division. In December of the same year, Lisanevich was promoted to lieutenant general.

Lisanevich arrived in the Caucasus in March 1825 and found the line in a difficult situation: the Circassians destroyed Russian colonies, Kabardia was engulfed in an uprising. As soon as Lisanevich began to pacify Kabarda, a riot broke out in Chechnya and threatened to stir up the whole of Dagestan. Lisanevich hurried to Chechnya to the rescue of the Gerzel-aul garrison, which was saved, but on July 18, 1825, General Nikolay Grekov was killed by the Kumyk mullah Uchar-hadji, and Lisanevich himself was mortally wounded.

== Death ==
The date and place of Lisanevich's death differs in different sources, in a number of encyclopedic publications they are called July 18 (Military encyclopedia of Sytin, Encyclopedia of Military and Marine Sciences) and July 22 (RBD) in Gerzel-aul, Modest Bogdanovich claims that Lisanevich died on July 20, and Potto says that Lisanevich was transported to the Grozny fortress and died there on July 24; the place of his burial is unknown, both Grozny and Georgievsk are mentioned as his burial places.

== Family ==
He was married to a member of a noble family of Armenian origin Ekaterina Semyonovna Ivanova. In the marriage, two sons were born: Dmitry and Simeon, who also served in the Russian imperial army and were major generals.
