= Khanlar agha Javanshir =

Azerbaijani statesman

- Born: c. 1775; Shusha, Karabakh Khanate
- Died: 19 November 1832 (aged 56–57); Shusha, Russian Empire
- Relatives: Javanshir clan
- Military career
- Allegiance: (Russia) Russian Empire
- Branch: Cavalry
- Rank: Colonel

Khanlar agha Javanshir (Azerbaijani: Xanlar ağa Sarıcalı-Cavanşir) was a statesman, colonel, son of the seventh Karabakh Khan Ibrahim Khalil Khan.

== Life ==
The son of Ibrahim Khalil Khan from Bike-khanum of Avar. According to the report of Prince Tsitsianov in November 1805, he was 30 years old.

After the signing by his father in May 1805 of a treaty of Kurakchay on the transfer of the Karabakh Khanate to Russian rule, Khanlar agha, at the suggestion of the commander-in-chief General Tsitsianov, was promoted to colonel by the decree of July 8, 1805.

Khanlar agha was with his father when, on May 27, 1806, the latter was killed during an attack on their camp by rangers of Lieutenant Colonel Lisanevich. "... Frightened by this unexpected incident," Khanlar agha fled to Qajar Empire, where he remained until the arrival of the new commander-in-chief General Count Gudovich, in Tiflis. With the arrival of the new commander-in-chief, Khanlar agha, through his brother Mehdigulu Khan Javanshir, “asked both forgiveness for his act and permission to return to Karabakh.” The commander-in-chief announced forgiveness to him, according to which Khanlar-aga immediately returned to Karabakh and on April 16, 1807, renewed his oath. From that day on, his salary was restored to the rank of colonel.

Until 1823, Colonel Khanlar agha owned two taxpayer title in the Karabakh Khanate. The income due to these titles or privileges was changed in 1823. According to the order of General Yermolov, instead of these revenues, he is paid from the treasury. In addition, at the time of the abolition of the khan's power in December 1822, Colonel Khanlar agha owned 10 villages and camps, the hereditary rights to which were also left to him by the Russian government. After his death in 1832, this estate (with the exception of the pension) passed to his half-brother Ahmed agha.

Colonel Khanlar aga and his relatives owned 20 villages and oymags, in which 948 families lived (578 taxpayers, 370 non-payers). The vast majority of families - 869 (91.67%) were Muslim and only 79 (8.33%) were non-Muslim.

== See also ==
- Mammad Hasan agha Javanshir

== Sources ==
- Chingizoglu, Anvar (2015). Cavanşir eli: Sarıcalı oymağı. Baku. pp. 351–352.
- Berge, Adolf (1866). Акты, собранные Кавказской археографической комиссией. Tiflis. p. 827.
- Berge, Adolf (1868). Акты, собранные Кавказской археографической комиссией. Tiflis. p. 1238.
- Berge, Adolf (1869). Акты, собранные Кавказской археографической комиссией. Tiflis. p. 767.
- Berge, Adolf (1874). Акты, собранные Кавказской археографической комиссией. Tiflis. p. 957.
