= Agha Baji Javanshir =

Iranian royal consort and poet (d. 1832)

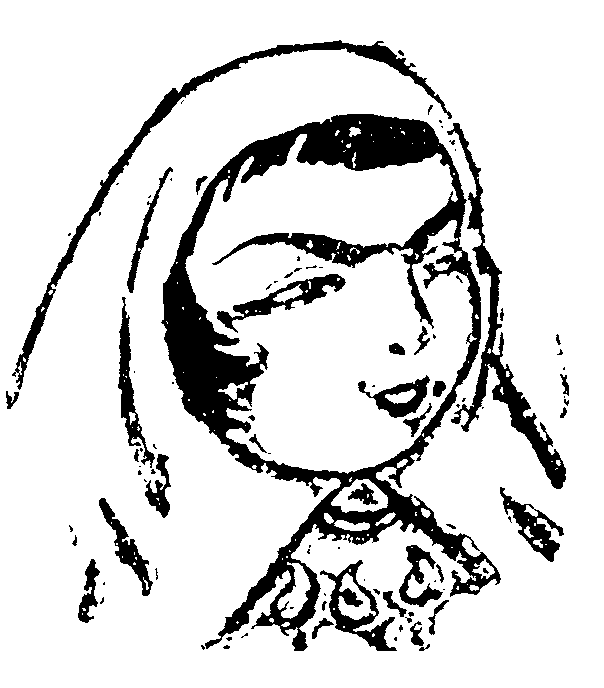
- A 1956 imaginary drawing of Agha Baji Javanshir in the Zanan-e sokhanvar
- Died: 1832; Qom, Qajar Iran
- Burial: Fatima Masumeh Shrine, Qom
- Spouse: Fath-Ali Shah Qajar
- Dynasty: Qajar (by marriage)
- Father: Ibrahim Khalil Khan
- Mother: Tuti Begum
- Religion: Islam
- Occupation: Poet

Agha Baji Javanshir (Persian: آغابیگم جوانشیر; died 1832) was an Iranian poet, who was the twelfth wife of Fath-Ali Shah Qajar (r. 1797–1834), the Qajar shah (king) of Iran. She was the daughter of Ibrahim Khalil Khan, the governor of the Karabakh Khanate. She was a very beautiful and respected woman, and she composed poetry in Persian and Turkish. She was one of the exceptionally prominent figures of the Qajar era.

== Biography ==
Agha Baji was the daughter of Ibrahim Khalil Khan, the governor of the Karabakh Khanate and member of the Turkic Javanshir tribe. Her mother was Tuti Begum, the daughter of Javad Khan, the governor of the Ganja Khanate.

According to Richard Tapper, Agha Baji was married to the Qajar shah (king) Fath-Ali Shah Qajar (r. 1797–1834) in 1797 after Ibrahim Khalil Khan had sent the body of the previous Agha Mohammad Khan Qajar (r. 1789–1797) to the Iranian capital of Tehran. However, the Iranian historian Parisa Sanjabi states that the marriage took place in 1779/1800, after the death of Fath-Ali Shah's wife Asiya Khanum.

By marrying Fath-Ali Shah, she became his twelfth wife. Islamic law set the limit of wives at four, and she was technically not a legal wife but a concubine. She arrived at the court of Fath-Ali Shah with a retinue of more than 200 servants belonging to the nobility of Karabakh. She was also accompanied by her brother Abu'l-Fath Khan Javanshir. Despite being well-liked at court, she continued to be a virgin for unknown reasons. It has been suggested this was because Fath-Ali Shah considered her father to have had a hand in Agha Mohammad Khan's death. Agha Baji received payment from the profits of Qom and its surroundings and resided in a palace next to the Imamzadeh Qasim with her family.

Agha Baji died in 1832 in Qom, where she was buried. A poet, she left a couple verses in Persian and one in Azerbaijani Turkish, demonstrating her fluency in these two languages.

== Political influence ==
Agha Begum Agha, a poet and a woman acquainted with modern civilization, became a consort of Fath-Ali Shah. This marriage was unsuccessful in personal and emotional terms, but it led to the growing influence of the Javanshir and Karabakh communities residing in Iran within the Qajar power structure. Agha Baji was very beautiful and respected; she was entrusted with receiving the wife of the British ambassador sent to Iran and with accepting the gifts from the Queen of England, the consort of George III. The Shah sought her opinion on political matters, international relations, and even the Treaty of Turkmenchay, and she also wrote a critique of it. Agha Begum was an educated woman, familiar with music and devoted to poetry and literature.

It is said that in her youth she was in love with her cousin, Mohammad Beg, but she was married off—without her consent—to the Qajar Shah in 1212 AH. Having witnessed the condition of women in her father’s harem, she showed little inclination toward the Qajar Shah. This led to the creation of many legends surrounding the wedding night of the bride and groom. Admirers of the Shah narrated that after entering the bridal chamber, the Shah said, “I encountered a serpent.” Some sources, however, accused her of arrogance and pride. Supporters of Agha Begum Agha also spread rumors that, because the bride possessed a strong, composed, and dignified personality, the Shah was unable to consummate the marriage with her. In their storytelling, they went even further and claimed that, to demonstrate her lack of interest in the Shah, she wore the Shah’s mother’s clothes. In old Turkic tradition, it was customary that if a bride put on the groom’s mother’s clothing, she would become mahram (ritually unmarriageable) to him.

She would at times use her influence to secure the release of prisoners from the gallows. All the servants of the court showed due respect to this noble lady. Agha Begum remained a virgin throughout her life; however, as mentioned, the Shah held great respect for her. Although she was still young, she was so important that whatever she asked of the Shah was accepted. Even though she was not from the Qajar family, she stood below Asiya Khanum Devellu, the mother of the crown prince—through this, the Shah demonstrated that he held her in higher esteem than his other wives.

Agha Baji had little desire to associate closely with the Shah’s other wives and the residents of the harem. For this reason, she resided in a palace the Shah had built for his summer retreat near Emamzadeh Qasem in Shemiran. The factions that had formed within the harem held her in regard, and each sought to gain her support. One of the women who had formed such a faction was Kokab Khanum, the daughter of Hasan Khan, the governor of Yerevan. Fath-Ali Shah also granted her the revenues of the city of Qom.

After some time, Agha Baji went to Qom with her adopted children and settled there, and the Shah would visit her in the city. During her residence in Qom, she took initiatives to build a mosque, a school, and a bathhouse. The members of the harem referred to her as “Lady of the Shah’s Ladies,” “Lady of the Harem,” and “Queen of Iran.”

== Sources ==
- Bournoutian, George (1994). A History of Qarabagh: An Annotated Translation of Mirza Jamal Javanshir Qarabaghi's Tarikh-e Qarabagh. Mazda Publishers. ISBN 978-1-56859-011-0.
- Bournoutian, George (2021). From the Kur to the Aras: A Military History of Russia's Move into the South Caucasus and the First Russo-Iranian War, 1801–1813. Brill. ISBN 978-90-04-44515-4.
- Sanjabi, Parisa (2019). "احمدخان مقدم". The Great Islamic Encyclopaedia (in Persian).
- Tapper, Richard (1997). Frontier Nomads of Iran: A Political and Social History of the Shahsevan. Cambridge University Press. ISBN 978-0-52158-336-7.
