= Abbasqoli Khan Mo'tamed od-Dowleh Javanshir =

Minister of Justice of Iran (died 1861)

Abbasqoli Khan Javanshir Mo'tamed od-Dowleh
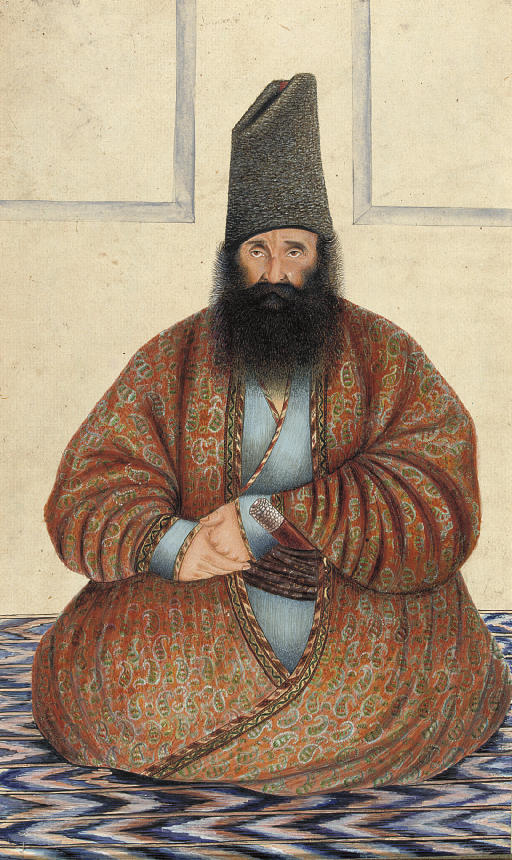
- Portrait of Abbasqoli Khan Mo'tamed od-Dowleh Javanshir, possibly by Abu'l-Hasan Sani al-Mulk. Made in Qajar Iran, dated c. 1860

Minister of Justice of Iran
- In office 1858–1861
- Appointed by: Naser al-Din Shah Qajar
- Preceded by: Office established
- Succeeded by: Mohammad Ebrahim Khan Javanshir

Personal details
- Died: 1861 Qajar Iran
- Parent: Abu'l-Fath Khan Javanshir (father)
- Relatives: Mohammad Ali Khan Javanshir (brother); Mohammad Qoli Khan Javanshir (brother); Mohammad Taqi Khan Javanshir (brother); Mohammad Ebrahim Khan Javanshir (brother)
- Clan: Javanshir

Abbasqoli Khan Mo'tamed od-Dowleh Javanshir (Persian: عباسقلی معتمدالدوله جوانشیر; died 1861) was an Iranian official from the Javanshir tribe, who served as the first Minister of Justice of Iran from 1858 to 1861.

In 1835, Abbasqoli Khan was appointed governor of the city of Kashan by Mohammad Shah Qajar (r. 1834–1848), but was replaced the following year due to local discontent. After a period of unemployment, he became governor of the Kerman province in 1841, where he initiated agricultural projects and restored the Arg-e Bam castle. He was dismissed in 1843 and, in 1848, was appointed military chief to crown prince Naser al-Din during the latters of governorship of the Azerbaijan province.

During the 45-day interregnum in mid-1848, between Mohammad Shah's death and Naser al-Din's accession, Abbasqoli Khan oversaw the management of state revenues under the regency of queen Malek Jahan Khanom. He shortly afterward became the governor of Ardabil, Meshginshahr, and Qaradagh, where he successfully quelled lawlessness and tribal conflicts, particularly those involving the Shahsevan tribe. In 1858, he was appointed as Iran's first Minister of Justice, serving until his death.

== Background ==
Abbasqoli Khan Mo'tamed od-Dowleh Javanshir was the son of Abu'l-Fath Khan Javanshir. who had fought under Qajar Iran in the Russo-Iranian War of 1804–1813. They belonged to the Javanshir tribe, a Turkic tribe which lived in the Karabakh region of the South Caucasus. Abbasqoli Khan belonged to a branch of the Javanshirs who stayed in the Iranian court due to the Russian conquest of Karabakh. There, the family became high-ranking administrators. Abbasqoli Khan had four brothers; Mohammad Ebrahim Khan Javanshir, who served as the Ministry of Justice twice. Mohammad Ali Khan Javanshir and Mohammad Qoli Khan Javanshir, who both served in the army of the Qajar prince Qahraman Mirza as sarhang (colonel) and major, respectively. Another brother, Taqi Khan Javanshir, died in 1851.

== Career ==
In 1835, Abbasqoli Khan was appointed the governor of the city of Kashan by the shah (king) Mohammad Shah Qajar (r. 1834–1848). However, due to the dissatisfaction of the locals, he was replaced by Bahman Mirza Baha od-Dowleh the next year. After several years of unemployment, Abbasqoli Khan was appointed the governor of the Kerman province in 1841, thus succeeding Fazl Ali Khan Qarabaghi. During his term, he attempted to handle the offenses and failures of his predecessors while also treating the populace generously. He restored the Arg-e Bam castle in the city of Bam, had a well made there, and accumulated years of supplies for Bam. In order to grow silkworms, he ordered that 12,000 mulberries planted outside of Kerman. In 1843, he was removed from the office, being replaced by Fazl Ali Khan Qarabaghi, who was re-appointed. During the governorship of the Azerbaijan province by the crown prince Naser al-Din in 1848, Abbasqoli Khan was appointed as his military chief. The appointment was most likely made by the grand vizier Haji Mirza Aqasi to restrict the influence of the three brothers of queen Malek Jahan Khanom.

Map of the northeastern part of the Azerbaijan province and its surroundings

After Mohammad Shah's death in the same year, the administration was temporarily led by Malek Jahan Khanom, who appointed governors and officials until Naser al-Din made his way from Tabriz to Tehran, a period lasting 45 days. During this period, Abbasqoli Khan was given the responsibility of the managing the country's revenues and to avoid shortage of grain. Ardabil, like the rest of Azerbaijan, had become a lawless place after the death of Mohammad Shah. The new shah Naser al-Din Shah appointed Abbasqoli Khan as the governor of Ardabil, Meshginshahr and Qaradagh.

Abbasqoli Khan received specific orders to catch and imprison Eskandar Khan, Haji Mohammad Ali, the brothers Shah Palang and Shah Mar, all of the Shahsevan branch of Meshginshahr, as well as to clear the borders of bandits. He went towards the area in summer 1849, where he en route met the Qajar prince Hamzeh Mirza Heshmat od-Dowleh in Zanjan. There Abbasqoli Khan and Hamzeh Mirza were informed of the violence between the Hajji-Khojalu and Damirchili tribes (both from the Shahsevan branch in Meshginshahr), which had resulted in multiple casualties.

As a result, they moved toward the environs of Ardabil and wrote to several Shahsevan and Qaradaghi chiefs, commanding that they gather troops and subdue the Hajji-Khojalu, which seemingly ended in a success. Reaching Tabriz, Hamzeh Mirza and Abbasqoli Mo'tamad-dawla sent instructions to the nobles of Qaradagh to apprehend certain Shahsevan leaders, assigning 500 cavalry to ensure their transport to Tabriz. In late 1849, Abbasqoli Khan went to Meshginshahr and Qaradagh, where he captured a number of Shahsevan leaders. In January 1850, Abbasqoli Khan's actions, which were described as "severe but necessary punishments" were reported to have been beneficial in the area, now in a "tolerably quiet state".

In 1858, Abbasqoli Khan received the title of "Mo'tamed od-Dowleh" and was appointed as the 1st Minister of Justice of Iran by Naser al-Din Shah. He held this position until his death in 1861. The modern Iranian historian Seyyed Ali Al-i Davud has described Abbasqoli Khan as "one of the notables and distinguished figures of the reign of Naser al-Din Shah". Besides having two portraits by Abu'l-Hasan Sani al-Mulk, an illustration of Abbasqoli Khan is also depicted in the Nezamiyeh Hall of the Golestan Palace.

== Sources ==
- Amanat, Abbas (1997). Pivot of the Universe: Nasir Al-Din Shah Qajar and the Iranian Monarchy, 1831–1896. I.B. Tauris. ISBN 978-1845118280.
- Bournoutian, George (2021). From the Kur to the Aras: A Military History of Russia's Move into the South Caucasus and the First Russo-Iranian War, 1801–1813. Brill. ISBN 978-90-04-44515-4.
- Davud, Seyyed Ali Al-i (2015). "Abū al-Fatḥ Khān Jawānshīr". In Fleet, Kate; Krämer, Gudrun; Matringe, Denis; Nawas, John; Rowson, Everett (eds.). Encyclopaedia of Islam (3rd ed.). Brill Online. ISSN 1873-9830.
- Salur, Sima (2014). "Javanshir family". Encyclopaedia of the World of Islam (in Persian). Vol. 2. Encyclopaedia Islamica Foundation. ISBN 9789644470127.
- Tabatabayi, Seyyed Jamaloddin Torabi (1998). "A document of a proxy Hajj". Miqat-e Hajj (in Persian). 6 (23).
- Tapper, Richard (1997). Frontier Nomads of Iran: A Political and Social History of the Shahsevan. Cambridge University Press. ISBN 978-0-52158-336-7.
- Zoka, Yahya (2003). Parham, Cyrus (ed.). The Life and Works of Sani' ol-Molk: Abol-Hassan Ghaffari 1814-1866. Iran University Press. ISBN 978-9640110966.
