= Muhammad Gasim agha Javanshir =

Azerbaijani statesman

- Born: 1786; Shusha, Karabakh Khanate
- Died: 19 November 1844 (aged 57–58); Shusha, Russian Empire
- Relatives: Javanshir clan
- Military career
- Allegiance: (Russia) Russian Empire
- Branch: Cavalry
- Rank: colonel

Muhammad Gasim agha Javanshir (Azerbaijani: Məhəmmədqasım ağa Sarıcalı-Cavanşir) was a statesman, colonel, son of the seventh Karabakh Khan Ibrahim Khalil Khan.

== Life ==
The son of Ibrahim Khalil Khan from the daughter of Allahyar bey Ungutlinsky. Muhammad Gasim agha Javanshir, although he was not with his father when he was killed by the rangers of Lieutenant Colonel Lisanevich, however, like his older brother Khanlar-aga, fled to Qajar Empire. He was able to return to Karabakh only in the autumn of 1807, already under the new commander-in-chief in Georgia, Count Gudovich (1806-1809), was forgiven and renewed his oath.

At the time of the abolition of the khan's power in December 1822, Muhammad Kasim-aga owned 12 villages and nomad camps, the hereditary rights to which were also left to him by the Russian government.

On December 24, 1823, “according to the testimony of the commander of a separate Caucasian Corps, General Yermolov, about his commitment to the Russian government and well-intentioned behavior,” Muhammad Gasim agha Javanshir was promoted to lieutenant colonel with the production of his salary of 600 rubles in silver per year. After his death, the payment of half of this pension was stopped, and the second half, on the basis of the highest order of October 28, 1843 and the order of the State Treasury Department to the Shemakha State Chamber of March 4, 1844, his heirs began to receive.

== Family ==
Muhammad Gasim agha Javanshir was married to Khadija Begum, the daughter of his uncle Mehrali bey Javanshir, and also to Husnu-Jahan-khanum. He had four sons: Najaf-Gulu agha, Pasha agha (c. 1820-?), Kerim agha (1826-1907), Gasim agha (c. 1834-?) and two daughters: Jahan Khanum and Bala Khanum.

== See also ==
- Mammad Hasan agha Javanshir

== Sources ==
- Chingizoglu, Anvar (2015). Cavanşir eli: Sarıcalı oymağı. Baku. pp. 351–352.
