= Ma'ather-e Soltaniyeh =

The Ma'ather-e Soltaniyeh (Persian: مآثر سلطانیه) is a Persian chronicle published in 1825/26, covering the history of Iran between 1722 and 1825, but mostly on the reign of Fath-Ali Shah Qajar (r. 1797–1834). It was written by poet and historian Abd al-Razzaq Beg Donboli, who worked for the crown prince Abbas Mirza.

== Sources ==
- Amanat, Abbas (2020). "Historiography vi. Qajar Period". Encyclopaedia Iranica Online. Brill. doi:10.1163/2330-4804_EIRO_COM_3101.
- Perry, John R. (2020). "ʿAbd-al-Razzāq Beg". Encyclopaedia Iranica Online. Brill. doi:10.1163/2330-4804_EIRO_COM_4365.
