= Negarestan-e Dara =

The Negarestan-e Dara (Persian: نگارستان دارا, romanized: the Picture-gallery of Darius) is a collection of biographies of contemporary Persian poets composed by Abd al-Razzaq Beg Donboli, possibly in 1825/26.

== Sources ==
- Perry, John R. (2020). "ʿAbd-al-Razzāq Beg". Encyclopaedia Iranica Online. Brill.
- Ter-Abe, Naofumi (2017). "The Politics of Poetics in Early Qajar Iran: Writing Royal-Commissioned Tazkeras at Fath-ʿAli Shāh's Court". Journal of Persianate Studies. 10 (2). Brill: 128–157. doi:10.1163/18747167-12341311.
