= Mahammadhasan Agha Palace =

Historical palace in Shusha, Azerbaijan

Mammad Hasan agha palace Məhəmmədhəsən ağa sarayı
- Location: Shusha, Azerbaijan

History
- Founded: 1751-1753

Site notes
- Owner: Mammad Hasan agha Javanshir

Mammad Hasan agha palace (Azerbaijani: Məhəmmədhəsən ağa sarayı) is a historical palace located in the historical center of Shusha city. The palace was built on a steep rock in the southeast of the Shusha plateau. The palace belonged to Mammad Hasan agha, the eldest son of Ibrahim Khalil Khan, and his family members. Agha Mohammad Shah Qajar Muhammad Hasan, who captured Shusha in 1796, began to live in the Mammad Hasan agha palace, and in 1797 he was murdered in this palace by his servant Safar Ali.

== History ==
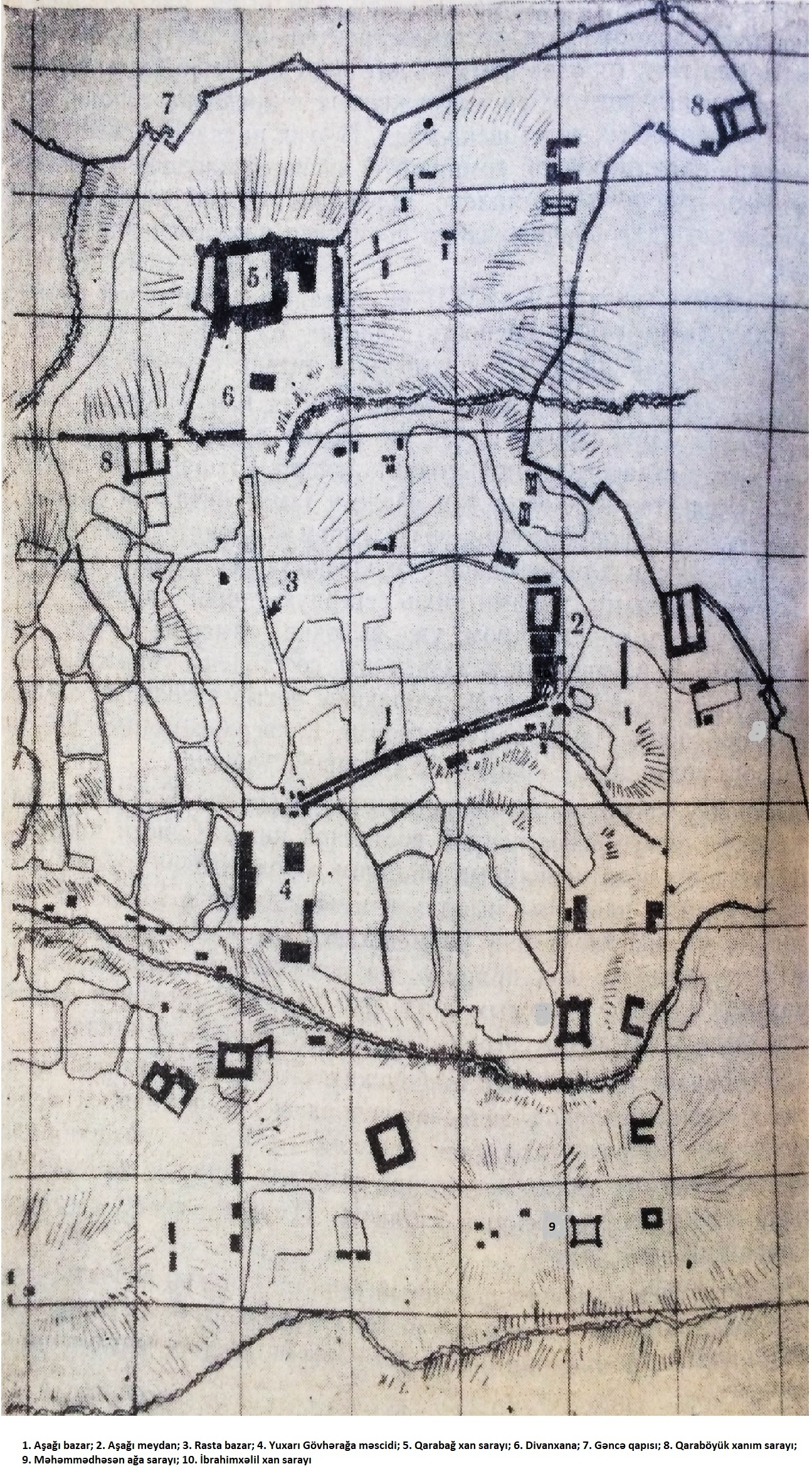
Location of the Mammad Hasan agha palace in the plan of the historical center of Shusha

Castles where the khan's palace is located are characteristic for the fortress-cities of the feudal period of Azerbaijan. These castles, which are dominant in terms of architecture and planning of new cities that were the capitals of khanates, small feudal states that began to form from the beginning of the 18th century, housed a palace complex and other auxiliary buildings to ensure the residence, safety and activities of the ruler and his family. In the 16th-18th centuries, the ruling castles in Azerbaijan were called Icheri gala, Bala gala or Ark (as in Tabriz, for example).

As the area where the Shusha fortress is located has a unique strategic feature, the construction of the castles inside the fortress, including the castle of Panah Ali Khan, was started at the same time as the construction of the Shusha fortress. According to Mirza Adigozal bey, during the reign of Panah Ali Khan, "wide buildings and tall palaces" were built for the members of the Khan family in Shusha.

According to N. Dubrovin, on the steep rock on the south-eastern side of the castle, "the square-shaped palace of Mammad Hasan agha, the son of Ibrahim Khalil Khan" was located. During the occupation of Shusha fortress in 1796–1797, Agha Mohammad Shah Qajar and his nobles settled in this palace.

In the 19th-century plans of Shusha city, including the general plan of 1837, a square-shaped building with large dimensions is shown in the place indicated by N. Dubrovin. That building is marked in the plans as "Colonel Jafargulu Aga's house". Jafargulu agha was the son and successor of Mammad Hasan agha.

== Architecture ==
The architectural features of the palace and the description of the bedroom used by Agha Muhammad Khan Qajar when he lived in the palace can be found in the work of N. Dubrovin. Describing the palace, he writes:

"A wide gate leads to an inner courtyard. Behind the closed galleries located along the main facade are the khan's rooms, successfully hidden from the sun's rays. Until recently, one could see the Karabakh ruler spending his days motionless on soft carpets surrounded by his servants through the half-open patterned windows of those rooms.. The khan, who gave away the parade rooms to the courtiers, slept in a small room away from prying eyes. His beloved servants, Abbas Bey and Safar Ali Khan, lived in the other two rooms in the corridor. There was no furniture in the gloomy room where Khan lived. The entire floor was completely covered with carpets to protect the ruler's feet from the cold stones. Near the wall is the throne, which the Khan used as a bed, seat, and parade seat, popular at the time. A cloth, richly decorated with pearls and precious stones, hung from this throne and reached to the floor. An unadorned space in the middle of the ornate canopy was intended for the khan to sit. From this part it was seen that the fabric was crimson velvet. The khan, dressed in a long fur coat and tied around his waist with a red shawl, would sit here and receive his visitors."

E. Avalov notes that according to the city plan of the 19th century, the inner courtyard of the palace is also square-shaped. The Prussian statesman and writer August von Haxthausen, who visited Shusha in 1843, noted that the palace did not differ much from the surrounding buildings in terms of appearance.

== Sources ==
- Авалов, Э. В. (1977). Архитектура города Шуши и проблемы сохранения его исторического облика. Баку: Элм.
- Фатуллаев, Ш. С. (1970). Памятники Шуши. Баку.
- Саламзаде, А. В. (1964). Архитектура Азербайджана XVI-XIX вв. Баку.
- Дубровин, Н. (1886). История войны и владычества русских на Кавказе (т.3 ed.). СПб.
