= Farajollah Khan Shahsevan =

Military officer of Qajar Iran

Farajollah Khan Shahsevan was a 19th-century military officer of Qajar Iran, who took part in the Russo-Persian War of 1804–1813. Farajollah belonged to the Shahsevan tribe, as well as the ruling dynasty of the Ardabil Khanate. Although the family's privilege to govern Ardabil was abolished in 1808 by the Qajars, Farajollah Khan and his family continued to support and collaborate with them.

On September 28, 1809, Farajollah Khan led a force of 11,000 soldiers towards the town Lankaran, which was captured and razed. The Russian ships were unable to help, due the town being encircled by woods.

== Sources ==
- Bournoutian, George (2021). From the Kur to the Aras: A Military History of Russia's Move into the South Caucasus and the First Russo-Iranian War, 1801–1813. Brill. ISBN 978-9004445154.
- Tapper, Richard (1997). Frontier Nomads of Iran: A Political and Social History of the Shahsevan. Cambridge University Press. ISBN 978-0-52158-336-7.
- Tapper, Richard (2010). "Shahsevan". Encyclopaedia Iranica.
