= Bahman Mirza Baha od-Dowleh =

Iranian prince (19th century)

Bahman Mirza
- Baha od-Dowleh
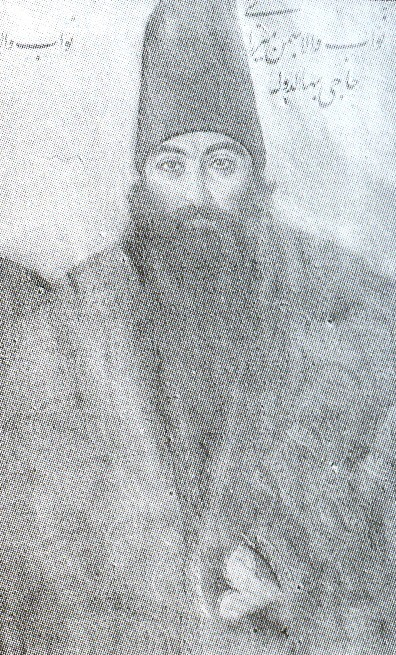
- Illustration of Bahman Mirza Baha od-Dowleh (detail). From the Nezamiyeh Hall Panel in the Golestan Palace
- Born: 13 November 1811
- Died: 19th-century
- Issue: Four sons and two daughters
- Dynasty: Qajar dynasty
- Father: Fath-Ali Shah Qajar
- Mother: Golbadan Baji
- Religion: Twelver Shia Islam

Bahman Mirza Baha od-Dowleh (Persian: بهمن میرزا بهاءالدوله) was a Qajar prince and governor in Iran. He was the thirty-seventh son of Fath-Ali Shah Qajar (r. 1797–1834).

== Biography ==
Born on 13 November 1811, he was the thirty-seventh son of Fath-Ali Shah Qajar (r. 1797–1834). His mother was Golbadan Baji, a former slave possibly of Georgian origin, who managed the household finances. Bahman Mirza's authority was restricted since he was Fath-Ali Shah's thirty-seventh son. In 1836, he was given the governorship of Kashan, replacing Abbasqoli Khan Mo'tamed od-Dowleh Javanshir. However, he was replaced in the same year by Mostafa-Qoli Khan Semnani.

In 1840, he was given the governorship of Yazd province, replacing his nephew Khanlar Mirza. In 1841/1842, a rebellion in the Kerman province was staged by Aga Khan I, the Imam of the Nizari Isma'ilis. The latter fled to Mehriz in Yazd due to being hunted by government forces. A force of Yazdi, Iraqi, and Shaqaqi soldiers, as well as two gun carriages, was assembled by Bahman Mirza. He attacked Aga Khan I in the village of Kalmand, but was defeated and returned to Yazd, while Aga Khan I returned to Kerman.

Bahman Mirza died during the reign of Naser al-Din Shah Qajar (r. 1848–1896).

== Family ==
Bahman Mirza had four sons and two daughters. His family maintained prominence and assumed the surname Jahansuz. His daughter Hajieh Homa Khanum was the wife of Qahraman Mirza and mother of Kioumars Mirza Amid od-Dowleh.

== Sources ==
- Farmanfarmaian, Mehrmah (2003). Life of Abdolhossein Mirza Farmanfarma (in Persian). Tus Publications. ISBN 964-315-622-2.
- Navai, Abdolhossein (1988). "Bahman Mīrzā Bahāʾ-al-Dawla". In Yarshater, Ehsan (ed.). Encyclopædia Iranica (Online ed.). Encyclopædia Iranica Foundation. ISBN 978-0710091215.
- Rabiei, Manijeh (2015). "Bahman Mirza Baha od-Dowleh". Encyclopaedia of the World of Islam (in Persian). Vol. 4. Encyclopaedia Islamica Foundation. ISBN 9789644470127.
