= Kurekchay =

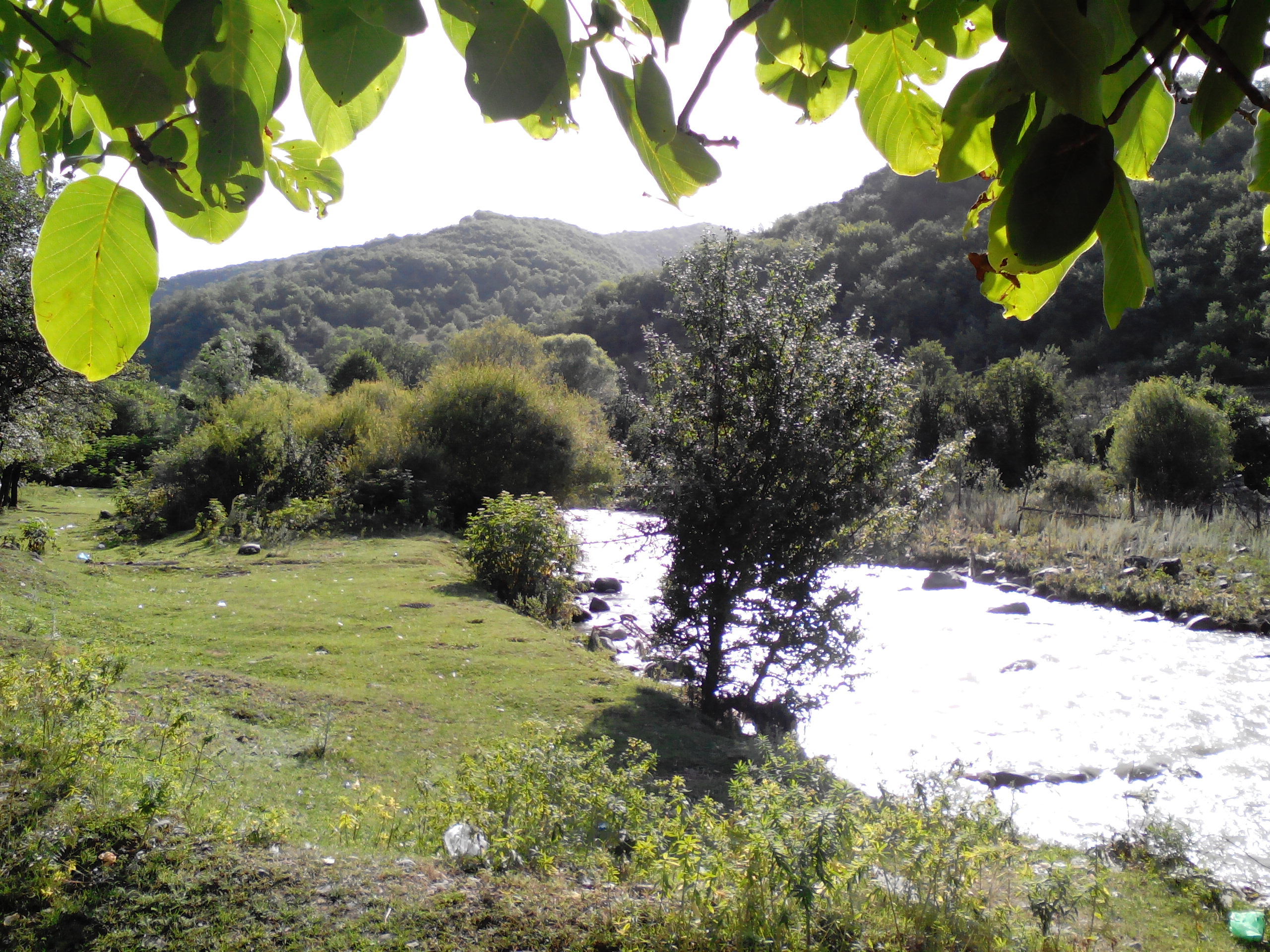
- Native name: Kürəkçay (Azerbaijani)

Location
- Country: Azerbaijan
- Region: Caucasus
- District: Goranboy, Goygol, Yevlakh

Physical characteristics
- Source: Lesser Caucasus
  - location: Azerbaijan
  - coordinates: 40°18′35″N 46°14′4″E
- Mouth: Kura
  - location: Azerbaijan
  - coordinates: 40.7251°N 47.0414°E
- Length: 186 km (116 mi)
- Discharge
  - location: directly downstream into Kura

Basin features
- Progression: Kura→ Caspian Sea

The Kurekchay (Azerbaijani: Kürəkçay) is one of the tributaries of the Kura River located in northwestern Azerbaijan.

== History ==
On 14 May 1805, on the bank of the river (not far from Ganja), the signing of the Treaty of Kurakchay took place, which transferred the Karabakh Khanate to Russian control.

== See also ==
- Bodies of water of Azerbaijan
- List of rivers of Azerbaijan
- Treaty of Kurakchay
