= Karim Khan Zand: A History of Iran, 1747–1779 =

1979 history book by John R. Perry

- Author: John R. Perry
- Series: Publications of the Center for Middle Eastern Studies; no. 12
- Subject: Karim Khan, founder of the Zand dynasty
- Genre: Scientific
- Published: 1979
- Publisher: University of Chicago Press
- Pages: 340
- Dewey Decimal: 955.03
- LC Class: DS295 .P47

Karim Khan Zand: A History of Iran, 1747–1779 is a history book by John R. Perry that focuses on Karim Khan Zand, the founder of the Zand Dynasty, who ruled Iran for about thirty years. The book was published in 1979 by the University of Chicago Press and generally received positive reviews from critics.

== Summary ==
The book traces Karim Khan Zand's rise from the post-Nader Shah interregnum to his consolidation of power as Vakil, with Shiraz as his capital; it follows his defeats of rivals such as Azad Khan Afghan and Mohammad Hasan Khan Qajar, his campaigns in Kurdistan and the capture of Basra, and his administrative, economic, and building policies, while also noting his occasional ruthlessness in suppressing dissent, and it concludes with his death in 1779 and the succession crisis that helped clear the way for Qajar reunification.

== Release and reception ==
The book was authored by John R. Perry and published by the University of Chicago Press in 1979, spanning 340 pages. It was issued as no. 12 in the series Publications of the Center for Middle Eastern Studies. The Persian translation was first published in 1365 SH (1986 or 1987), translated by Ali-Mohammad Saki and published by Farāz Publications as a 476-page volume in Tehran.

=== Critical response ===
In synthesizing the reception of John Perry's work on Karim Khan Zand, reviewers offer a collectively nuanced, largely commendatory yet pointedly constructive assessment. D. O. Morgan, writing in the International Journal of Middle East Studies, delivered a largely commendatory review, noting the book "fills a major gap" as the most comprehensive account, praising its meticulous narrative and analysis while offering pointed criticisms regarding occasional reliance on flawed secondary sources, and a glossing over of certain violent episodes and the destabilizing succession failure. Eden Naby from The American Historical Review offered a balanced assessment, deeming it an essential study that fills a scholarly gap, praising its compelling analysis of tribal-urban balance and its rigorous use of sources, but observed that its administrative history remains descriptive and noted the challenge its complex narrative poses for readers without considerable prior knowledge. R. M. Burrell, in the Bulletin of the School of Oriental and African Studies, agreed it was a "valuable guide" to an obscure period, praising its admirably clear chronology and thematic insights into Safavid continuities, yet inserted measured critique that its portrait was at times "somewhat indulgent," questioning the dismissal of violent purges and noting several speculative claims and minor errors. In the Middle East Studies Association Bulletin, Marilyn Waldman acknowledged the book's important undertaking and valuable thematic focus but criticized its execution, finding the detailed military narrative difficult to follow and overly source-driven, arguing that a deeper analysis of the chroniclers' styles could have yielded greater cultural insights. Pierre Oberling of Journal of Asian History, provided a largely favorable assessment, praising it as a thorough and informative scholarly contribution with valuable supporting materials, though he noted the dense narrative could overwhelm and cited a disappointingly brief treatment of tribal relations. Finally, Ewald Wagner in Zeitschrift der Deutschen Morgenländischen Gesellschaft wrote an expert and appreciative review, noting the work far surpassed earlier German studies in quality due to its broader source base—especially its systematic use of European archives like those of the East India Company—and its clear, context-rich integration of administrative, economic, and cultural history, with particular praise for its detailed treatment of the Persian Gulf. Ultimately, despite varied critiques regarding narrative density, analytical depth in sections, and minor omissions, the consensus affirms the book as a substantive, well-produced, and authoritative foundation for future scholarship on the Zand period.
