= Uchar Hajji =

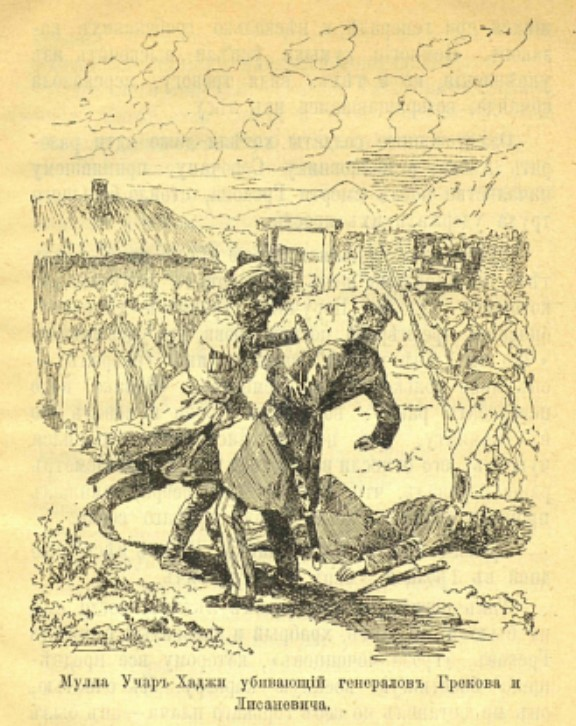
- Uchar Hajji kills Russian generals
- Born: Unknown; Old Aksay in what is now Khasavyurtovsky District
- Died: Unknown; Gerzel-aul
- Military career
- Conflicts: Caucasian War

Uchar Hajji (Note: Russian: Учар-Хаджи, Chechen: Уьчар-Хьаьжа, romanized: Üchar-X́äž; Also known as Otshar Yaqub from Aksay) (died in 1825) was a mullah, best known for killing two Russian generals at once.

== Background ==
According to some sources, he was Kumyk, according to others, Chechen.

== Events in Gerzel aul in 1825 ==
In the summer of 1825, during the Caucasian War two Russian generals Grekov and Lisanevich gathered more than 300 elders of the village of Aksay in the fortress of Gerzel-Aul. The aim was to impose penalties for the support in Aksay for the rebels, and General Yermolov's intention was also to force the people of Aksay to terminate any relations with the rebels. When the elders gathered, the Russian generals started insulting them. In return, Uchar-haji stabbed both generals with his dagger. A fierce melee started immediately and ended with all elders dead. In retribution, Aksay was destroyed by Russian forces, and it was forbidden for the locals to ever resettle the land again.
