= Kioumars Mirza Amid od-Dowleh =

Iranian prince (19th century)

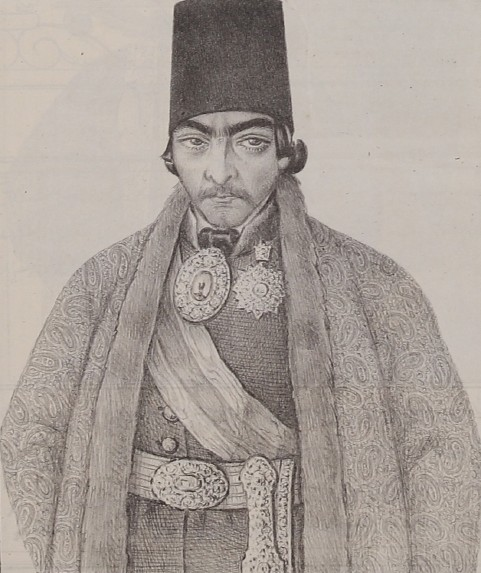
Portrait of Kioumars Mirza by Abu'l-Hasan Sani al-Mulk

Kioumars Mirza Amid od-Dowleh (Persian: کیومرث میرزا عمیدالدوله) was a Qajar prince of Iran who governed the Kerman province from 1858/59 to 1860/61. His governorship was nominal, as Mohammad Esmail Khan Nuri Vakil ol-Molk held the real power. At the end of his governorship, he received the title "Amid od-Dowleh", which his son Taj od-Dowleh later inherited.

Kioumars was the son of Qahraman Mirza, the eight son of Abbas Mirza. His mother was Hajieh Homa Khanum, a daughter of prince Bahman Mirza Baha od-Dowleh.

== Sources ==
- Bamdad, Mehdi (1971). شرح حال رجال ایران در قرن ۱۲ و ۱۳ و ۱۴ هجری [Dictionary of National Biography of Iran, 1700-1960, vol. 3].
- Farmanfarmaian, Mehrmah (2003). Life of Abdolhossein Mirza Farmanfarma (in Persian). Tus Publications. ISBN 964-315-622-2.
