= Golbadan Baji =

Iranian royal administrator and concubine

Golbadan Baji (Persian: گلبدن‌باجی) or Gulbadan Khanum (گلبدن خانم), also known by her title Khazen ol-Dowleh (خازن‌الدوله; fl. 19th-century) was a concubine of Fath-Ali Shah Qajar of Iran (r. 1797–1834).

== Biography ==
Of Georgian origin, she was originally a slave girl of Fath-Ali Shah's mother after whose death she rose to prominence.

Fath-Ali Shah's mother Mahd-e Olya Asiye Khanum Ezzeddin Qajar had been responsible for functioning as the administrator of the Qajar harem household and treasurer until her death. When she died, Fath-Ali Shah's wives were unable to choose a new head of the royal Qajar harem, and therefore requested Fath-Ali Shah to leave Golbadan Baji in charge of the household as she was reportedly familiar with the ways of her mistress. By choosing a concubine, Fath-Ali Shah's wives protected themselves from the perception of favouring one wife over another. Golbadan Baji therefore became head of the household pursestrings. According to contemporaneous sources, she fulfilled this task efficiently and with fidelity. Fath-Ali Shah was very impressed by Golbadan Baji's performance, and therefore married her as a sigheh, and gave her the honorific title (laqab) Khazen-ol-Dowleh.

She gave birth to two sons (Fath-Ali Shah's 37th son Bahman Mirza Baha od-Dowleh; and his 42nd son Seyfollah Mirza) and efficiently managed the harem's affairs and expenditures. According to contemporaneous sources, at Nowruz (the Iranian New Year), she chose gifts for the harem's residents, princes and notables including the governors of Iran's provinces. Golbadan Baji kept a detailed list of all expenditures and presents. She was well trusted by many inside and outside the harem. At the height of her influence, Golbadan Baji presided over the private treasury, the harem finances and the Shah's private funds whilst heading a host of women secretaries and accountants.

== Sources ==
- Amanat, Abbas (1999). "FATḤ-ʿALĪ SHAH QĀJĀR". In Yarshater, Ehsan (ed.). Encyclopædia Iranica. Vol. IX/4: Fārs II–Fauna III. London and New York: Routledge & Kegan Paul. pp. 407–421. ISBN 978-0-933273-32-0.
- Eskandari-Qajar, Manoutchehr (2018). "Temporary and Permanent Marriages at the Court of Fath 'Ali Shah Qajar: Taking a Second Look at the "Established Facts."". Paper given at the 4th Annual Conference of the Iranian Studies Initiative at UCSB.
- Navāʾī, ʿA. (1988). "BAHMAN MĪRZĀ BAHĀʾ-AL-DAWLA". In Yarshater, Ehsan (ed.). Encyclopædia Iranica. Vol. III/5: Bahai Faith III–Baḵtīārī tribe II. London and New York: Routledge & Kegan Paul. pp. 491–492. ISBN 978-0-71009-117-8.
- Nashat, Guity (2004). "Marriage in the Qajar Period". In Beck, Lois; Nashat, Guity (eds.). Women in Iran from 1800 to the Islamic Republic. University of Illinois Press. ISBN 978-0252071898.
