= Abd al-Razzaq Beg Donboli =

Iranian literary biographer, poet, and historian (c. 1762 – c. 1828)

- Born: 1762 or 1763
- Died: 1827 or 1828 (aged 64–66); Tabriz, Qajar Iran
- Occupations: Literary biographer, poet, historian
- Writing career
- Language: Persian
- Notable works: Ma'ather-e Soltaniyeh; Negarestan-e Dara

Abd al-Razzaq Beg Donboli (Persian: عبدالرزاق بیگ دنبلی; 1762/63–1827/28) was an Iranian literary biographer, poet, and historian active during the early Qajar era. He belonged to the Donboli, a Turkic-speaking Kurdish tribe, which played a leading role in the areas of Khoy and Salmas in Azerbaijan, northern Iran.

== Sources ==
- Perry, J. R. (1982). "Abd-al-Razzāq Beg". In Yarshater, Ehsan (ed.). Encyclopædia Iranica. Vol. I/2: ʿAbd-al-Hamīd–ʿAbd-al-Hamīd. London and New York: Routledge & Kegan Paul. p. 154. ISBN 978-0-71009-091-1.
- Werner, Christoph (2008). "ʿAbd al-Razzāq Beg Dunbulī". In Fleet, Kate; Krämer, Gudrun; Matringe, Denis; Nawas, John; Rowson, Everett (eds.). Encyclopaedia of Islam (3rd ed.). Brill Online. ISSN 1873-9830.
