= Mammad Hasan agha Javanshir =

Military leader

- Born: 1766; Shusha, Karabakh Khanate
- Died: 19 November 1805 (aged 38–39); Shusha, Karabakh Khanate, Russian Empire
- Relatives: Javanshir clan
- Military career
- Allegiance: (Russia) Russian Empire
- Branch: Cavalry
- Rank: Major general
- Conflicts: Russo-Persian War

Mammad Hasan agha Sarijali Javanshir (Azerbaijani: Məhəmmədhəsən ağa Sarıcalı-Cavanşir) was a military leader and major-general of the Russian army, father of major-general, public figure and poet Jafargulu agha Javanshir, as well as the ancestor of the Azerbaijani singer Khan Shushinski. He was born in 1766, Shusha as first son of Ibrahim Khalil Khan and his principal wife Khanum agha (also known as Nana Khanim) from Jabrayilli clan.

== Life ==
He led a 500 strong cavalry in pursuit of his cousin Muhammad bey (son of Mehrali bey) who seized rulership of Karabakh during chaos ensued Agha Muhammad Khan's death in 1797.

After the outbreak of the Russo-Persian War in 1804, his relations soured with his father following Fatali Shah's favorite and his half-brother Abulfat agha Javanshir's arrival from Iran. Since he was born of a "temporary wife" but had a royal favor, Mammad Hasan felt threatened allied with his other 'legitimate' half-brothers Khanlar agha Javanshir and Mehdigulu agha commanded horse cavalry, he battled 5,000 men led by his half-brother Abulfat agha Javanshir in Dizak, in December 1804 and captured 1,000 people.

He was given the rank of major-general in the Imperial Russian Army following his father's submission on 8 July 1805. On June 9, 1805, he participated in a battle against the Persian army as a cavalry commander in the Russian army, leading a detachment of the horse cavalry of Karabakh. He was also awarded a medal strewn with diamonds and with an engraving "For Loyalty."

He fell seriously ill in August 1805, and later died on November 19, 1805.

== Family ==
He had at least two wives:

1. Khayrunnisa begüm — daughter of Shahverdi Khan of Ganja
  - Jafargulu agha Javanshir
  - Shukur agha (c. 1789 - before 1844) — Landed noble
    - Ismail agha (c. 1807 - ?)
  - Khanjan agha (c. 1793 - before 1844) — Landed noble
    - Mahmud agha (1818-?)
      - Aslan agha (1865 - 1944)
        - Khan Shushinski (1901–1979) — Khananda
        - Allahyar Javanshirov (1907–1972) — Tar player, Musician
        - Rukhsara Javanshirova (1909–1974)
    - Aghakhan
    - Abbasqoli agha (1834-?)
    - Gullü begüm
    - Shirin begüm
    - Kichik begüm
  - Tubi begüm
2. Mahisharaf khanum — daughter of Jafarqoli Khan Donboli
  - Boyuk Khan (c. 1804 - after 1844) — Landed noble

== See also ==
- Muhammad Gasim agha Javanshir
