= Qahraman Mirza =

Iranian prince (d. 1839)

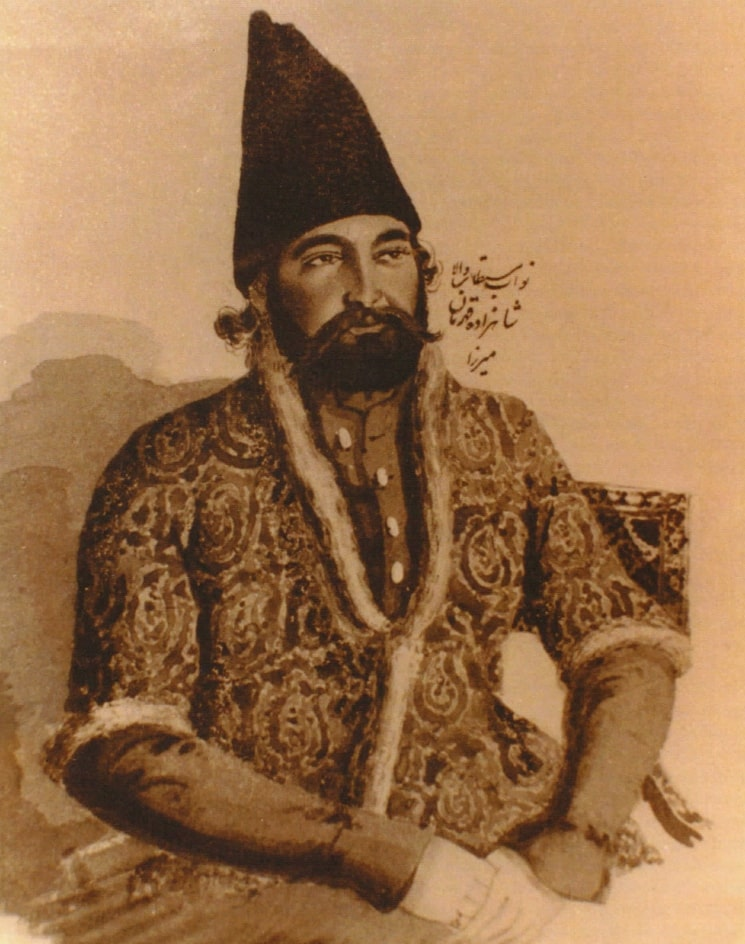
- Portrait of Qahraman Mirza, possibly by F. Colombari
- Died: 1839
- Spouse: Hajieh Homa Khanum
- Issue: Kioumars Mirza Amid od-Dowleh
- Dynasty: Qajar
- Father: Abbas Mirza
- Religion: Twelver Shia Islam

Qahraman Mirza (Persian: قهرمان میرزا) was a Qajar prince in 19th-century Iran. He was the eighth son of Abbas Mirza, who served as crown prince until his death from illness in 1832. Qahraman Mirza had two full brothers, Bahman Mirza and Mohammad Mirza (the later Mohammad Shah Qajar).

In 1831/32, Qahraman Mirza was appointed by his father as the governor of the town of Sabzevar. Mohammad Reza Khan Farahani, a son of Abol-Qasem Qa'em-Maqam, served as his deputy and minister. Qahraman Mirza died in 1839. He had a son named Kioumars Mirza Amid od-Dowleh with Hajieh Homa Khanum, a daughter of prince Bahman Mirza Baha od-Dowleh.

== Sources ==
- Amanat, Abbas (1997). Pivot of the Universe: Nasir Al-Din Shah Qajar and the Iranian Monarchy, 1831–1896. I.B. Tauris. ISBN 978-1845118280.
- Bamdad, Mehdi (1971). شرح حال رجال ایران در قرن ۱۲ و ۱۳ و ۱۴ هجری [Dictionary of National Biography of Iran, 1700-1960, vol. 3]. Tehran.
- Busse, H. (1982). "ʿAbbās Mīrzā Qajar". In Yarshater, Ehsan (ed.). Encyclopædia Iranica (Online ed.). Encyclopædia Iranica Foundation. ISBN 978-0710090959.
- Farmanfarmaian, Mehrmah (2003). Life of Abdolhossein Mirza Farmanfarma (in Persian). Tus Publications. ISBN 964-315-622-2.
