= Treaty of Kurakchay =

Treaty

Kurakchay treaty
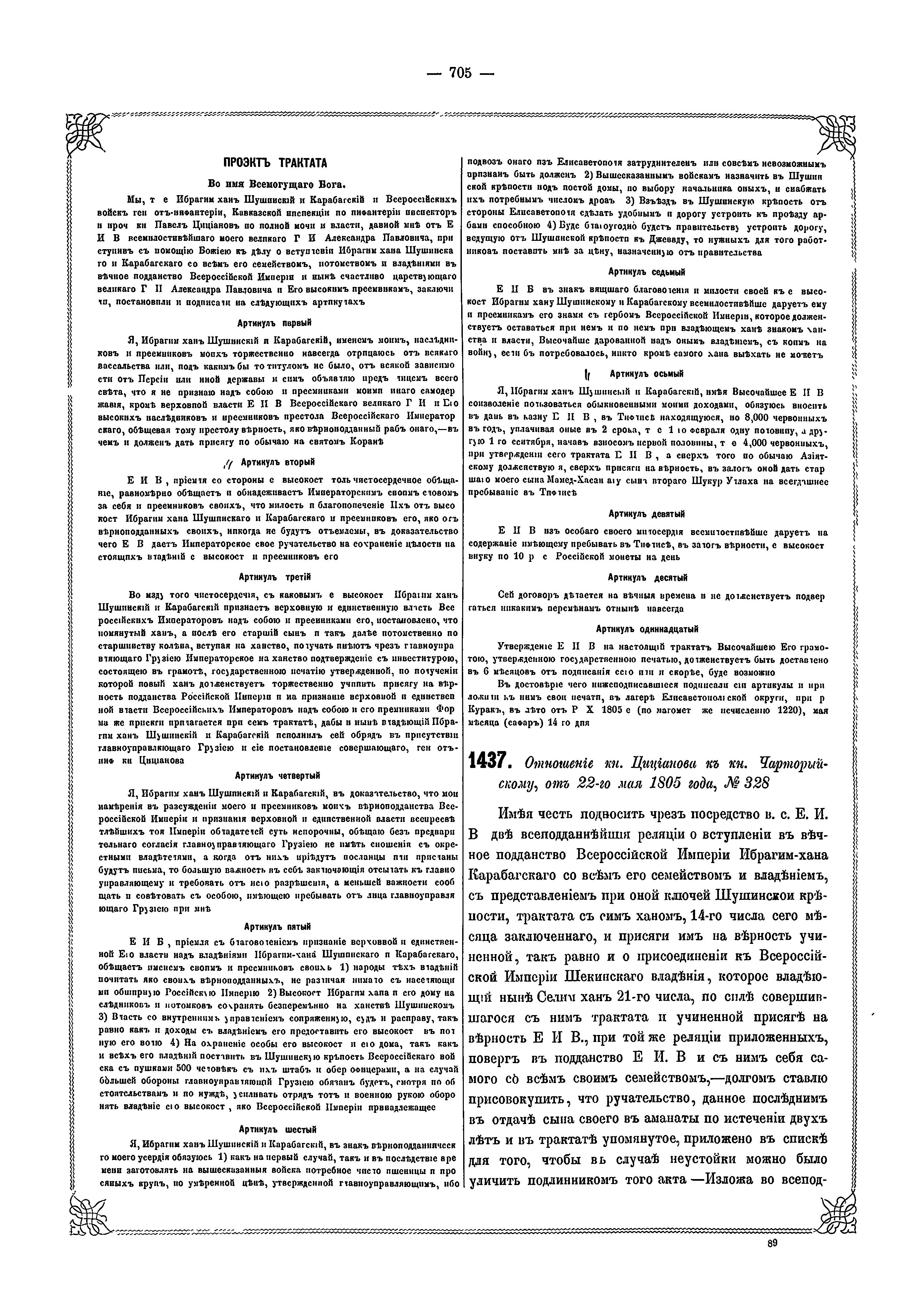
- The text of the treaty, published in 1868
- Type: political
- Drafted: May 14, 1805
- Signed: May 14, 1805
- Location: On the bank of the Kurekchay river, near Ganja
- Negotiators: Maj. Dmitri Tikhonovich Lisanevich; Ivan Jorayev
- Original signatories: Karabakh Khanate; Russian Empire
- Signatories: Ibrahim Khalil Khan; Pavel Tsitsianov
- Language: Russian

Full text
- Treaty of Kurakchay at Wikisource

Kurakchay treaty (Russian: Кюрекчайский договор, May 14, 1805) is a contract confirming the integration of the Karabakh Khanate into the Russian Empire. The signing ceremony took place on May 14, 1805, in a Russian military camp on the banks of the Kurekchay river, not far from Ganja. The agreement was signed by Ibrahim Khalil Khan and Commander-in-Chief of Georgia, Infantry General Pavel Tsitsianov (on behalf of Emperor Alexander I).

== Background ==
The Russian Empire took advantage of the division of the various Caucasian khanates and concluded agreements in the process. Commander-in-Chief of Russian troops in the Caucasus P. D. Tsitsianov began to exert military-diplomatic pressure on the Karabakh khanate after the occupation of Ganja Khanate. It is clear from Tsitsianov's correspondence with Ibrahim khan from Karabakh, the instructions of Georgian nobleman Ivan Jorayev and Lisanevich, who mediated the negotiations, that the khan tried to conclude the contract on favorable terms. From the agreements concluded by Tsarism with the rulers of the South Caucasus up to Kurakchay, the conditions for the annexation of these state institutions, the directive documents on their abolition, it is clear that the main articles of the Georgievsk Treaty were taken as a basis.

== Treaty ==
The capture of Ganja Khanate played an important role in accelerating the invasion of the Caucasian khanates. Back in early 1804, General Tsitsianov sent Lisanevich to Karabakh to Ibrahim Khalil Khan and demanded that transfer to Russian subordination. Ibrahim Khalil Khan asked Tsitsianov for military assistance to prevent the attack of Iranian troops and promised to help and remain loyal to Russia. At his request, Tsitsianov sent a team to Karabakh, led by Lisanevich. Tsitsianov set up camp on the Kurakchay River near Ganja. Ibrahim Khalil Khan came here with his sons Mammad Hasan agha, Mehdigulu Khan, Khanlar agha and other nobles of Karabakh.

The Treaty of Kurakchay

The treaty of Kurakchay consisted of a preamble and 11 articles. The introduction of the agreement stipulates the transfer of the Karabakh khanate to the Russian Empire, and the articles define the conditions arising from this. Articles 1, 4, 6, 8 and 9 of the agreement reflect the obligations of Ibrahim Khan, and Articles 2, 3, 5 and 7 reflect Russia's obligations. Russia unequivocally accepted the Karabakh khanate as an independent state, affirmed Ibrahim Khan and his successors as the only owners of the khanate. An important issue was the emperor's guarantee of the integrity of the Karabakh khanate. Khan undertakes to receive and maintain a 500-strong Russian garrison in Shusha fortress. The khan undertook to pay Russia an annual tribute of 8,000 chervonets and to send Mammad Hasan agha's son Shukur agha, as hostages to Tbilisi. The tsar promised to give 10 silver rubles a day to the grandson of the khan held hostage in Tbilisi.

Article X of the treaty stated that this treaty is concluded for an indefinite period and should not be changed. Article XI was about ratification. The Kurakchay treaty was signed in Russian. With the abolition of the Karabakh khanate by Russia in 1822, the Kurakchay treaty was terminated.
