= John R. Perry (orientalist) =

American linguist (born 1942)

- Born: 1942 (age 82–83)
- Education: Cambridge University (Pembroke College) (PhD)
- Scientific career
- Institutions: University of Chicago

John R. Perry (born 1942) is an American linguist and Professor of Persian Emeritus at the University of Chicago. He is known for his works on Persian and Tajik linguistics and culture.

== Books ==
- Karim Khan Zand: A History of Iran, 1747–1779, University of Chicago Press, 1979, translated into Persian, 1986, and Kurdish, 2005
- A Tajik Persian Reference Grammar, Leiden and Boston: Brill, 2005
