= Karabakh Khanate =

Khanate under Iranian and Russian control

- 1748–1822
- Map of the Karabakh Khanate
- Status: Khanate; Under Iranian suzerainty (1748–1813); Disputed between Iran and Russia (1805–1813); Under Russian suzerainty (1813–1822)
- Capital: Bayat (1748—c. 1752); Panahabad (later "Shusha") (c. 1752–1822)
- Common languages: Persian (administration, judiciary, and literature); Arabic (religious studies); Azerbaijani (locally); Armenian (locally); Kurdish (locally)
- Khan
  - 1748–1762: Panah Ali Khan (first)
  - 1762–1806: Ibrahim Khalil Khan (second)
  - 1806–1822: Mehdi Qoli Khan Javanshir (third and last)
- History
  - Established: 1748
  - Iran officially cedes Karabakh to the Russian Empire: 1813
  - Abolished by the Russian Empire: 1822
Preceded by	Succeeded by
Safavid Karabakh; Dizak	Elisabethpol Governorate
- Today part of: Armenia; Azerbaijan

The Karabakh Khanate (also spelled Qarabagh; Persian: خانات قره‌باغ, romanized: Khānāt-e Qarabāgh; (Note: In Persian, the khanates were historically referred to as ulka or tuman. The word "khanate" is an Anglicized form of the Russian word khanstvo and the Armenian word khanut'iun.) Russian: Карабахское ханство, romanized: Karabakhskoye khanstvo) was a khanate under Iranian and later Russian suzerainty, which controlled the historical region of Karabakh, now divided between modern-day Armenia and Azerbaijan. In terms of structure, the Karabakh Khanate was a miniature version of Iranian kingship. The administrative and literary language in Karabakh until the end of the 19th century was Persian, with Arabic being used only for religious studies, despite the fact that most of the Muslims in the region spoke a Turkic dialect.

It was governed by members of the Javanshir, a Turkic tribe which lived in the lowlands of the region. In 1747, the Javanshir chieftain Panah Ali Khan capitalized on the turmoil that erupted after the death of the Iranian shah (king) Nader Shah (r. 1736–1747) by seizing most of Karabakh. The following year he declared his allegiance to Nader Shah's son and successor Adel Shah (r. 1747–1748), who officially appointed him khan of Karabakh. Panah Ali Khan's tenure was marked by building activities (such as the castles of Bayat, Shah-Bulaghi, and Panahabad) and the subjugation of four of the melikdoms through the assistance of his new ally, Shahnazar II, the melik (prince) of Varanda.

In 1762, Panah Ali Khan acknowledged the authority of the Zand ruler Karim Khan Zand (r. 1751–1779), who had established his authority in most of Iran. The latter took Panah Ali Khan hostage to Shiraz and appointed his son Ibrahim Khalil Khan as the new khan. Following Karim Khan's death in 1779, Ibrahim Khalil Khan strived to maintain his autonomy by allying himself with the Georgian king Heraclius II and making contact with the Russian Empire, even briefly submitting to the latter. Because of his defiance, he was in 1797 ousted from Karabakh by Agha Mohammad Khan Qajar, the new ruler of Iran. Following Agha Mohammad Khan's assassination in Shusha the same year, Ibrahim Khalil Khan restored his authority in Karabakh. He established friendly relations with Agha Mohammad Khan's successor Fath-Ali Shah Qajar (r. 1797–1834), who married his daughter and confirmed him as the khan of Karabakh. In May 1805, he submitted to the Russians, signing the Treaty of Kurekchay, which granted them full authority over Karabakh's external affairs in exchange for a yearly payment.

Soon finding himself in a difficult position, Ibrahim Khalil Khan rejoined the Iranians. However, he was shortly afterwards murdered by a group of Russian soldiers under the instigation of his grandson Ja'far Qoli Agha and the Russian garrison leader. The Russians subsequently confirmed Ibrahim Khalil Khan's son Mehdi Qoli Khan as the khan, although real power was held by the Russians. By signing the Treaty of Gulistan in 1813, Iran officially ceded most of their Caucasian holdings (including Karabakh) to Russia. In 1822, Mehdi Qoli Khan fled to Iran as a result of the attempts by the Russian general Aleksey Petrovich Yermolov to abolish the khanates, which occurred afterwards.

== Background ==
The administrative divisions of Safavid Iran in the South Caucasus

Karabakh is a historic region located in the Armenian highlands in the South Caucasus. The area was originally considered the southern part of Arran and was mostly inhabited by Armenians. However, due to Turkic and Mongol invasions, the Armenians there became a minority in the 11th century, and by the 14th century, the Turko-Persian name Karabakh ("Black Garden") started slowly replacing the name of the area. Many of the surviving Armenian nobles and their followers resettled in the highlands of Karabakh, where they continued to have authority. The population of the Armenians in the lowlands was further dwindled by Timur's conquests and invasions of Turkmen tribes in the 14th and 15th centuries. By the early 16th century, Armenia had become a focal point of the constant wars between the Ottoman Empire (c. 1299–1922) and Safavid Iran (1501–1736), which further reduced the Armenian population.

The Safavids divided their Armenian territories into two provinces ruled by a beglarbegi (governor-general), Karabakh and Erivan. The Iranian-ruled part of Armenia was known as Iranian Armenia or Eastern Armenia, whilst the Ottoman part was known as Ottoman Armenia or Western Armenia. The lowlands of Karabakh were dominated by nomadic Turkic tribes, who moved to the hillsides in search of suitable pastures throughout the summer. The highlands of Karabakh were dominated by Armenian meliks (princes), who had established five melikdoms (Dizak, Gulistan, Jraberd, Khachen and Varanda) that ruled in Karabakh. These Armenian-ruled principalities, which upheld the notion of Armenian statehood, were used by the Safavids to fight the Ottoman Empire.

From 1554 and onwards, the governorship of both Karabakh and its capital Ganja was held by the Ziyadoghlu family of the Turkic Qajar tribe. Following the collapse of the Safavid regime in 1722, (Note: The Safavid regime collapsed in 1722 following their surrender to the Afghans during the siege of their capital, Isfahan.) the governorship was divided into two distinct areas, each controlled by a local clan. It was during this period that Panah Ali Khan distinguished himself. He was the leader of the Turkic Javanshir tribe, which now dominated the lowlands of Karabakh, as well as the Otuziki and Kebirlu tribal federation. The Safavid-era historian Iskandar Beg Munshi (died c. 1632) reported that the Javanshir did not belong to the seven principal Qizilbash tribes, but instead a lower-ranking group referred to as the "gholam amirs". According to the Rowzat-al-Safa Naseri, the later leaders of the Javanshir belonged to the Sarijalu tribe as they had taken over the leadership of the Javanshir. For decades, the Javanshir had moved its sheep to Karabakh, where they had given the meliks an annual tax in exchange for access to summer pasturage. Karabakh thus held immense significance for the tribe.

In 1723, the Ottomans invaded Iran, conquering most of its northeastern part by 1724. Karabakh and Zangezur were the only parts of Iranian Armenia which managed to fend off the Ottomans, under the leadership of Davit Bek, who led the Armenian meliks. Although Davit Bek died between 1726 and 1728, his successors managed to maintain their control over most of the highlands until the resurgence of Iran, now led by Nader Khan Afshar, who repelled the Ottomans in 1735. The following year, he crowned himself as Nader Shah, marking the foundation of the Afsharid dynasty.

Nader Shah rewarded the meliks by acknowledging Karabakh and Zangezur as semi-autonomous regions. He had Iranian Armenia organized into four khanates; Erivan, Nakhchivan, Ganja, and Karabakh. A khanate was a type of administrative unit governed by a hereditary or appointed ruler subject to Iranian rule. The title of the ruler was either beglarbegi or khan, which was identical to the Ottoman rank of pasha. Nader Shah also forced several Turkic tribes (including the Javanshir) to mainland Iran in order to guarantee their allegiance. Panah Ali Khan's son Ibrahim Khalil Khan and the rest of the Javanshir tribe were forced to resettle in Khorasan. Panah Ali Khan was an exception, as he was kept hostage. However, following the execution of his brother Behbud Ali Beg in c. 1744, Panah Ali Khan escaped to the Lezgins, where he concealed himself from Nader Shah.

== History ==
=== Panah Ali Khan ===
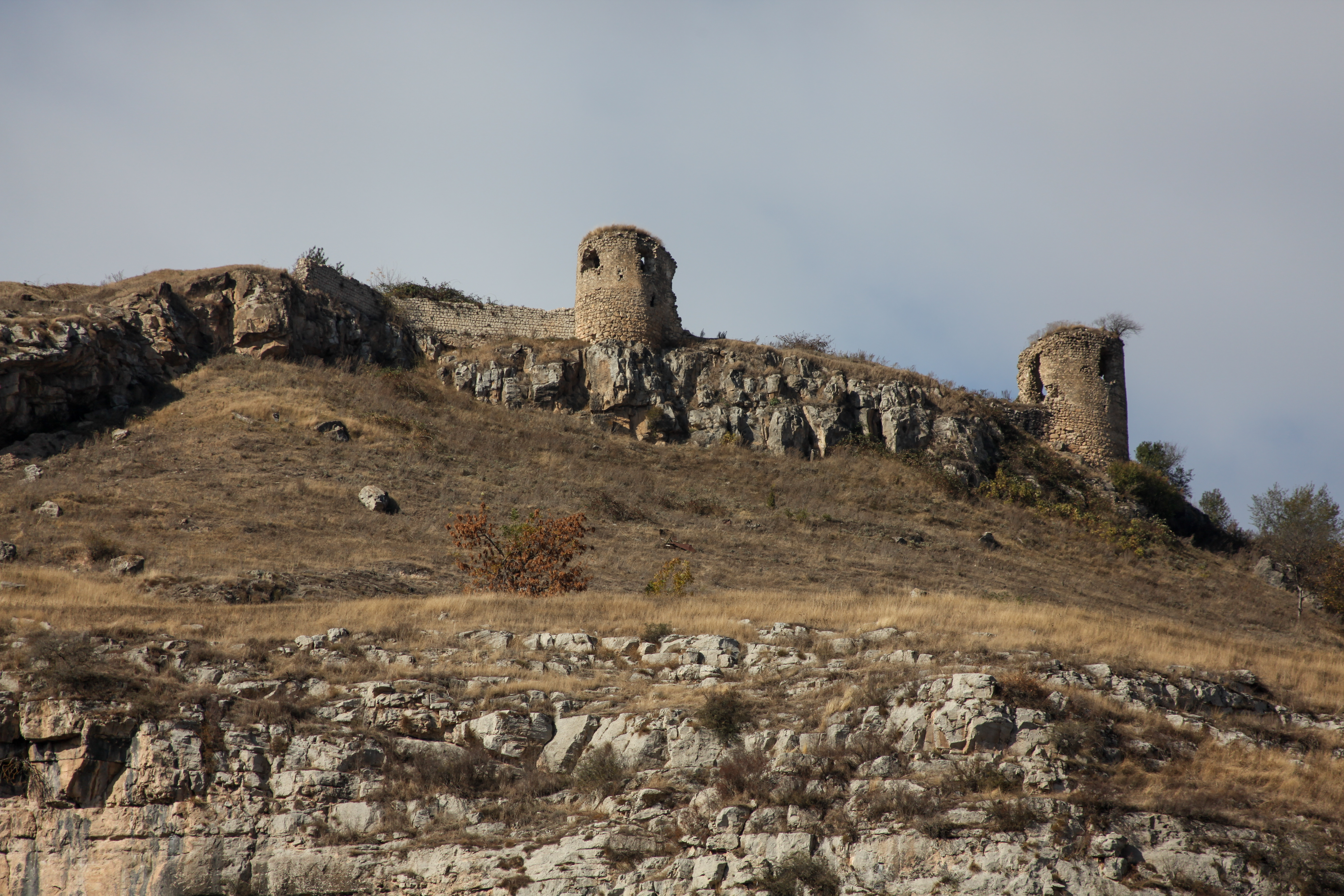
The ruins of the Panahabad fortress in Shusha, which served as the center of power of the Karabakh Khanate after 1752

Following Nader Shah's assassination in 1747, Iran fell into turmoil, especially in the South Caucasus. There the Georgians and local khans fought over land. Some Turkic tribes took advantage of his death by restoring their power in Iranian Armenia. The Qajars restored their power in Ganja, Erivan and Nakhchivan, while Panah Ali Khan seized control over all of Karabakh, with the exception of the five melikdoms. Ibrahim Khalil Khan and the rest of the Javanshir tribe had also returned to Karabakh. In 1748, Panah Ali Khan declared his allegiance to Nader Shah's son and successor Adel Shah (r. 1747–1748), who officially appointed him khan of Karabakh.

Shortly afterwards, Panah Ali Khan had the Bayat Castle constructed, in which he housed his entire family, his retinue, dignitaries, and numerous tribal leaders. Panah Ali Khan soon fell into a conflict with Haji Chalabi Khan, the khan of the Shaki Khanate. He occasionally attempted to form an alliance with Georgia in an effort to restrain Haji Chalabi Khan's goals, but his efforts were ineffective. In 1752, Panah Ali Khan relocated everyone from Bayat to the newly constructed Shah-Bulaghi stronghold, which brought him within close proximity of the highlands ruled by the five Armenian melikdoms. Panah Ali Khan made an alliance with Shahnazar II, the melik of Varanda, while he imposed his authority on the remaining meliks and made their subjects pay him taxes. Both Armenian sources and the Javanshir historian Mirza Jamal Javanshir agree that it was through the efforts of Shahnazar II (who was in conflict with the other meliks) that Panah Ali Khan gained access to the highlands and started attacking the meliks.

Together, Panah Ali Khan and Shahnazar II had the Panahabad fortress constructed in Shusha, a place in Varanda. Panah Ali Khan relocated the notables, dignitaries, and tribal leaders there. The power of the Javanshir became centered in that stronghold, which would withstand many sieges. The nature of the Javanshir khans' patron-client relationship with Shahnazar II is unclear, but it appears that their control of the fortress was restricted to its southern part, which was its Muslim sector. In 1757, the Qajar chieftain Mohammad Hasan Khan Qajar made an unsuccessful attempt at capturing Shusha. Panah Ali Khan afterwards captured the city of Ardabil and installed his clansman Dargah-Qoli Beg Javanshir its governor, though it is uncertain how long he held the post. Nazar Ali Khan Shahsevan is later recorded as its governor under the Zand ruler Karim Khan Zand (r. 1751–1779). In the spring or summer of 1761, the Afshar chieftain Fath-Ali Khan Afshar besieged Shusha. Panah Ali Khan made him lift the siege by giving Ibrahim Khalil Khan as hostage.

By 1762, Karim Khan had established his authority across most of Iran, and was eventually acknowledged by Georgia and the various khans of the South Caucasus as their suzerain. This included Panah Ali Khan, who along with some other khans was taken hostage to the city of Shiraz, where he died.

=== Ibrahim Khalil Khan ===
==== Consolidation of power ====
Karim Khan subsequently appointed Ibrahim Khalil Khan as the new khan of Karabakh. Following Karim Khan's death on 1 March 1779, however, a power struggle ensured amongst his kinsmen. Ibrahim Khalil Khan took advantage on the chaos that followed by pursuing his own goals. He enhanced his standing by forging an alliance with Heraclius II, the king of Eastern Georgia (Kartli-Kakheti). Agha Mohammad Khan Qajar, the future shah of Iran, had been a nominal hostage of Karim Khan in Shiraz and was entirely preoccupied with establishing his authority and eliminating rivals in Iran. As they battled to preserve their autonomy at a time when the Iranians and Russians wanted to incorporate the eastern Caucasus under their own empires, Georgia and Karabakh's partnership turned out to be highly beneficial for both of them.

Capitalizing on the turmoil in Iran, as well as the Ottomans inability to confront Russia, a group of Russians politicians, led by the military leader and statesman Grigory Potemkin, convinced the Russian empress Catherine II (r. 1762–1796) to agree to a bilateral treaty (the Treaty of Georgievsk) with Heraclius in 1783. Heraclius, who was worried of reinstatement of fidelty to Iran, agreed to the terms of the treaty, which was to renounce his loyalty to Iran in return for Russian protection. This treaty strained the relationship between Heraclius and Ibrahim Khalil Khan, who also attempted to get in contact with the Russians, but was ignored by Catherine II, as she did not want to get embroiled in the conflict between the khans.

Ibrahim Khalil Khan continued his fathers efforts to dominate all of Karabakh, succeeding in retaining Shahnazar II's support and also married his daughter. He also took Melik Bakhtam of Dizak hostage and had him sent to Ardabil in mainland Iran, which Dizak was incorporated into. Ibrahim Khalil also captured both Melik Abov of Gulistan and Melik Medjlum of Jraberd and granted their domains to others.

==== First conflict with Agha Mohammad Khan Qajar ====
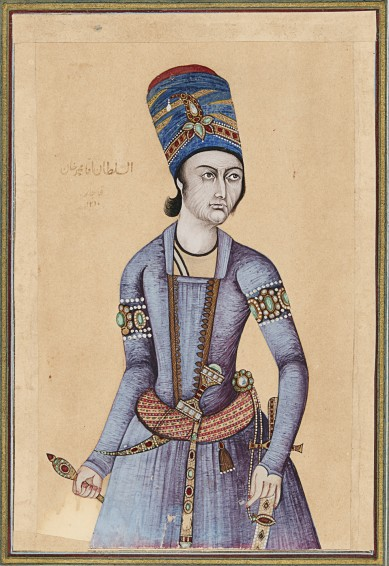
A portrait of Agha Mohammad Khan Qajar, the shah of Iran. Dated 1795

The Russo-Turkish War of 1787–1792 caused the Russian troops to abandon the city of Tiflis at the same time as Agha Mohammad Khan's authority in Iran was growing. Since the time of the first Safavid shah (king) Ismail I (r. 1501–1524), the Iranian shahs had declared rulership over parts of the Caucasus. This included Nader Shah, Karim Khan and now Agha Mohammad Khan. The neighboring khanates were still seen as Iranian dependencies even when the shahs in mainland Iran lacked the power to enforce their rule in the area. Likewise, Agha Mohammad Khan also considered Georgia to be an Iranian province. He issued threatening letters to the khans who had established connections with Russia in an effort to reestablish Iranian dominance over the border districts. In 1792/93, Agha Mohammad Khan assigned his lieutenant Soleyman Khan Qajar with the task of putting an end to any opposition against his authority.

Instead of going in person, Ibrahim Khalil Khan dispatched his nephew Abd al-Samad Beg to deliver presents and offerings to Soleyman Khan in the city of Tabriz. He also asked for a deadline of the summer to prepare to make the trip himself. Soleyman Khan took Abd al-Samad as his captive, and by the end of November 1793 went to the Mazandaran region before making his way to the city of Tehran. Abd al-Samad was later part of the retinue that accompanied Agha Mohammad Khan during his siege of the city of Kerman. During the siege, Abd al-Samad made an attempt to escape to Karabakh, but was captured and killed near Tehran. This incident upset Ibrahim Khalil, who continued to make excuses to avoid meeting Agha Mohammad Khan.

Agha Mohammad Khan was prepared to reinstate Iranian rule in the southeastern Caucasus by the summer of 1795. He was unafraid to engage the Russians, a trait he retained throughout, and neither the Treaty of Georgievsk nor Russian activity in the southeastern Caucasus seemed to discourage him. His 60,000 soldiers, which was primarily made up of cavalry, advanced into the area in the summer of that year. The first few months were spent by Agha Mohammad Khan winning the Muslim rulers' compliance. Ibrahim Khalil Khan and two other khans (Mir-Mostafa Khan of Talesh and Mohammad Khan Qajar of Erivan) entered into correspondence with the Russians, who gave them hope that they could defeat the Iranian forces. Heraclius also contacted the Russians, asking them for assistance against the impending invasion.

10,000 of Agha Mohammad Khan's forces first marched towards Talesh, which quickly submitted. Meanwhile, Ibrahim Khalil Khan had the Khudafarin bridge demolished to stop the Iranian army from crossing the Aras River. The bridge served as the main route from the Azerbaijan region into Karabakh and the rest of Caucasus. Despite this, the Iranian forces succeeded in getting to the other side of the river by using boats, and also rebuilt the bridge. Ibrahim Khalil Khan's forces were defeated and withdrew to Shusha, which was then besieged by Agha Mohammad Khan for 43 days.

Due to the capture of his two nephews and the worsening conditions of the siege, Ibrahim Khalil Khan petitioned for peace and promised that he would acknowledge Agha Mohammad Khan's suzerainty. He sent one of his sons to act as a hostage in his stead, claiming that his age-related ailments prevented him from meeting Agha Mohammad Khan directly. However, he still refused to give entry into Shusha. Agha Mohammad Khan was willing to compromise in order to clear a path to Tiflis due to the campaign's primary goal being the subjugation of Georgia.

==== Dispute over Karabakh between Iran and Russia ====
Political map of the eastern part of the Southern Caucasus between 1795 and 1801

As a result of Heraclius' refusal to submit, Agha Mohammad Khan marched to Tiflis and had it ravaged in September 1795. Catherine II, viewing the attack on Tiflis as an offense to Russia, used it as a reason to invade the South Caucasus. In March 1796, she sent a public declaration, written in Persian and Armenian, to all the khans and important figures of the region. The letter explained her reason behind the invasion as a way to protect Georgia and the rest of the South Caucasus from the "usurper" Agha Mohammad Khan.

Ibrahim Khalil Khan submitted to the Russians, as he feared them more than the Iranians. Although neither a treaty nor a Russian garrison was established in Karabakh, this event established a model for eventual Russian assertions of sovereignty over Karabakh and other khanates. However, Catherine II's death on 17 November 1796 led to the withdrawal of the Russian forces under the orders of her son and successor Paul I (r. 1796–1801), and thus an end to the campaign. By January 1797, all the Russian troops had withdrawn to Kizlyar.

In order to exact revenge on the khans who had acknowledged the authority of Russia, Agha Mohammad Khan went back to the Caucasus. Ibrahim Khalil Khan escaped this time to his relative Umma Khan V in Daghestan, but his family was reinstated following Agha Mohammad Khan's assassination in Shusha on 17 June 1797. Ibrahim Khalil Khan's nephew Mohammad Beg briefly assumed charge of the khanate, but not long after Ibrahim Khalil Khan came back and re-established his authority. He quickly established friendly relations with Agha Mohammad Khan's successor Fath-Ali Shah Qajar (r. 1797–1834), who married his daughter and confirmed him as the khan of Karabakh.

Fath-Ali Shah was later convinced of Ibrahim Khalil Khan's lack of reliability by his unwillingness to help Javad Khan against the Russian siege of Ganja in 1804. Thus, Ibrahim Khalil Khan's son Abu'l-Fath Khan Javanshir was appointed as the new khan. Despite this, Ibrahim Khalil Khan continued to rule as the khan of Karabakh. Multiple clashes took place in 1804 between the Iranian and Russian armies, but they had no significant impact on the situation. The Georgian nobleman Pavel Tsitsianov, who led the Russian campaign and led the siege of Ganja, soon forced Ibrahim Khalil Khan to yield and accept a Russian garrison in Shusha. In May 1805, Ibrahim Khalil Khan signed the Treaty of Kurekchay, which granted Russia full authority over Karabakh's external affairs in exchange for a yearly payment. Russia also recognized Ibrahim Khalil and his lineage through his eldest son as the rulers of Karabakh.

In the same year, Fath-Ali Shah led a large force to the Aras River, while the crown prince Abbas Mirza was assigned with the task of handling Ibrahim Khalil Khan. The Russians were temporarily interrupted by the murder of Tsitsianov in February 1806. During this period, Ibrahim Khalil Khan sent a letter to Fath-Ali Shah, in which he apologized for yielding to the Russians, declared his willingness to side with Iran, and requested assistance in regaining control of the castle at Shusha. Ibrahim Khalil Khan's change of heart had been caused by the recent death of his eldest son and heir Mohammad Hasan Agha, who was a prominent major-general in the Russian army, and the Russians not seeming to be in a position to defend effectively against the larger Iranian army that was drawing near. Fath-Ali Shah pardoned Ibrahim Khalil Khan, who moved to an adjacent hill outside Shusha so that the Iranian forces could assault its garrison.

One of Ibrahim Khalil Khan's grandchildren, Ja'far Qoli Agha, the son of Mohammad Hasan Agha, whose succession was meant to be assured by the Treaty of Kurekchay and who had his own plans for ruling Karabakh, was frightened and angered by this action. On 2 June 1806, Ibrahim Khalil Khan along with some of his relatives and 30 members of his retinue were killed by a group of Russian soldiers under the instigation of Ja'far Qoli Agha and the commander of the Russian garrison. Although Ja'far Qoli Agha had hoped to become the new khan for helping the Russians against his grandfather's "betrayal", they ultimately appointed Ibrahim Khalil Khan's 30-year-old son Mehdi Qoli Khan Javanshir, due to the support he enjoyed amongst the distinguished figures of Karabakh.

=== Mehdi Qoli Khan ===
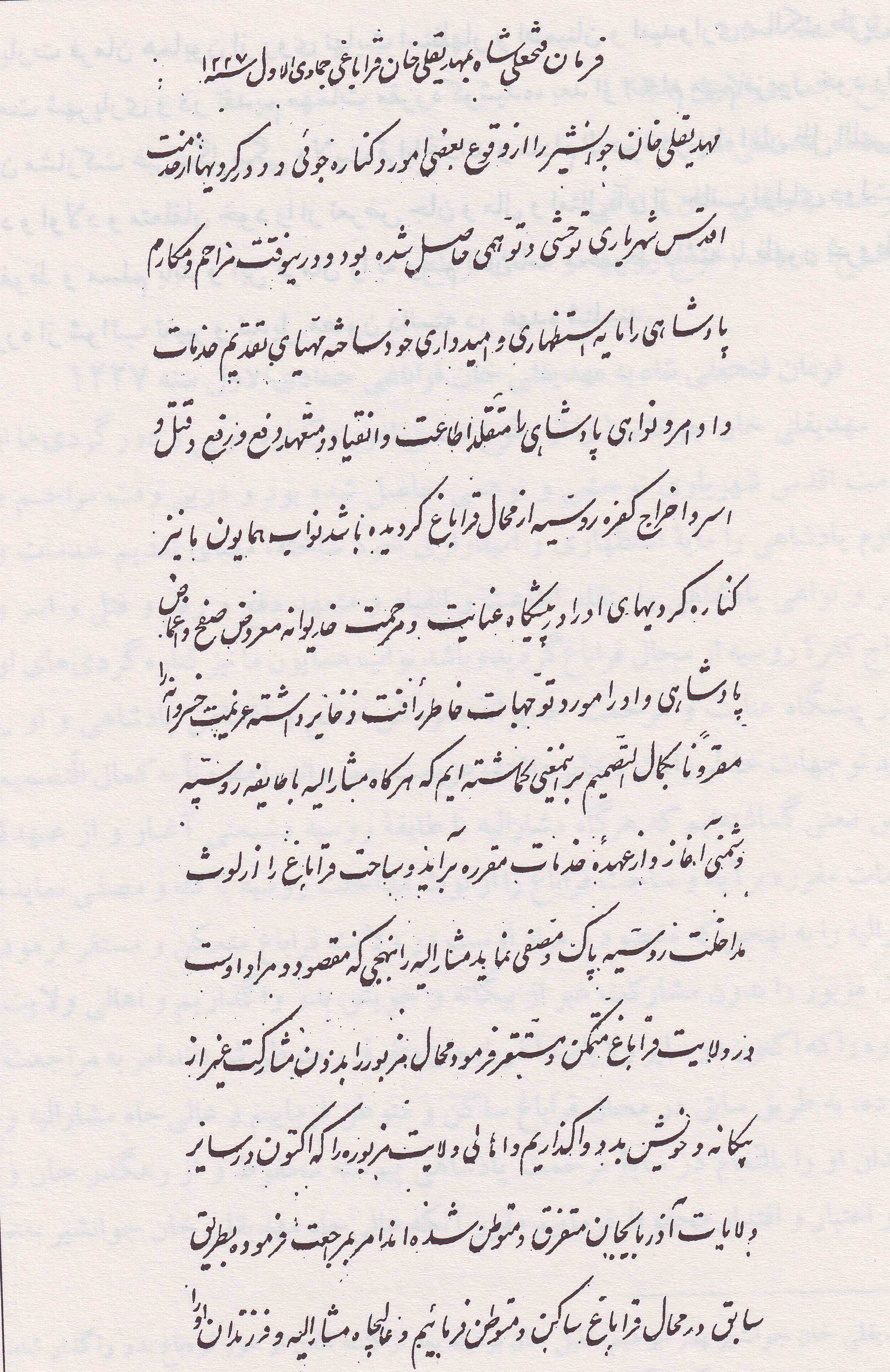
Page of the farman (royal decree) that Fath-Ali Shah Qajar had sent to Mehdi Qoli Khan

Mehdi Qoli Khan consented to abide by the Treaty of Kurekchay on September 22, 1806, when tsar Alexander I (r. 1801–1825) officially confirmed him as khan. Kotliarevskii, the new commander of the Russian garrison in Shusha, was forbidden by the Russian commander Ivan Gudovich to meddle in the internal affairs of the khanate because of his high regard for Mehdi Qoli Khan. Although Mehdi Qoli Khan held the title of khan of Karabakh, he was in reality a figurehead, the real authority being held by the Russians. In 1807, southern Karabakh had a sizable Iranian military presence.

In June 1812, Mehdi Qoli Khan received a farman (royal decree) from Fath-Ali Shah, asking him to reaffirm his loyalty and work with him to expel the Russians from Karabakh. In addition to forgiving Mehdi Qoli Khan for his earlier transgressions, Fath-Ali Shah would also install him as Karabakh's governor and work with him to bring back the tribes of Karabakh who had sought asylum in Azerbaijan. Mehdi Qoli Khan, who changed his alliance between Iran and Russia to his greatest advantage like the majority of the khans in the South Caucasus, made the decision to stick by Russia. In an effort to reassure his continuous allegiance to the Russian Empire, he sent Kotliarevskii the farman.

The Russo-Iranian War of 1804–1813 ended with the Treaty of Gulistan, in which Iran agreed to cede the majority of their holdings in the eastern Caucasus to Russia, including Karabakh. The treaty was signed in Gulistan, a village in Karabakh. The Iranians were disillusioned by the treaty, and officials like Mirza Bozorg Qa'em-Maqam vehemently opposed it. In 1822, Mehdi Qoli Khan fled to Iran as a result of the attempts by the Russian general Aleksey Petrovich Yermolov to abolish the khanates, which occurred afterwards.

In Iran, Mehdi Qoli Khan was amongst the members of the "war party" or the "hawks", who advocated for war against the Russians. He was later amongst the Iranian soldiers during the Russo-Iranian War of 1826–1828. He was finally given permission to go back to Karabakh in 1836, where he retired. He died 1845 and was buried in Aghdam.

== Building activity ==
According to Mirza Jamal Javanshir, Bayat received many new settlers (including artisans) from nearby areas, including Ardabil and Tabriz. The Iranian American historian George Bournoutian stated this passage shows that Javanshirs tribal dominion included more than just pastoral or migratory land. Their forts, which resembled small cities, served as the hubs of the khanate. The strongholds of Bayat, Shah-Bulaghi, and Shusha required a large number of craftsmen and laborers to construct and maintain them.

A common method in a large fortress-town was to have it centered around a maidan (square), which was next to the bazaar, the principal mosque, and hammams (baths).

== Coinage ==
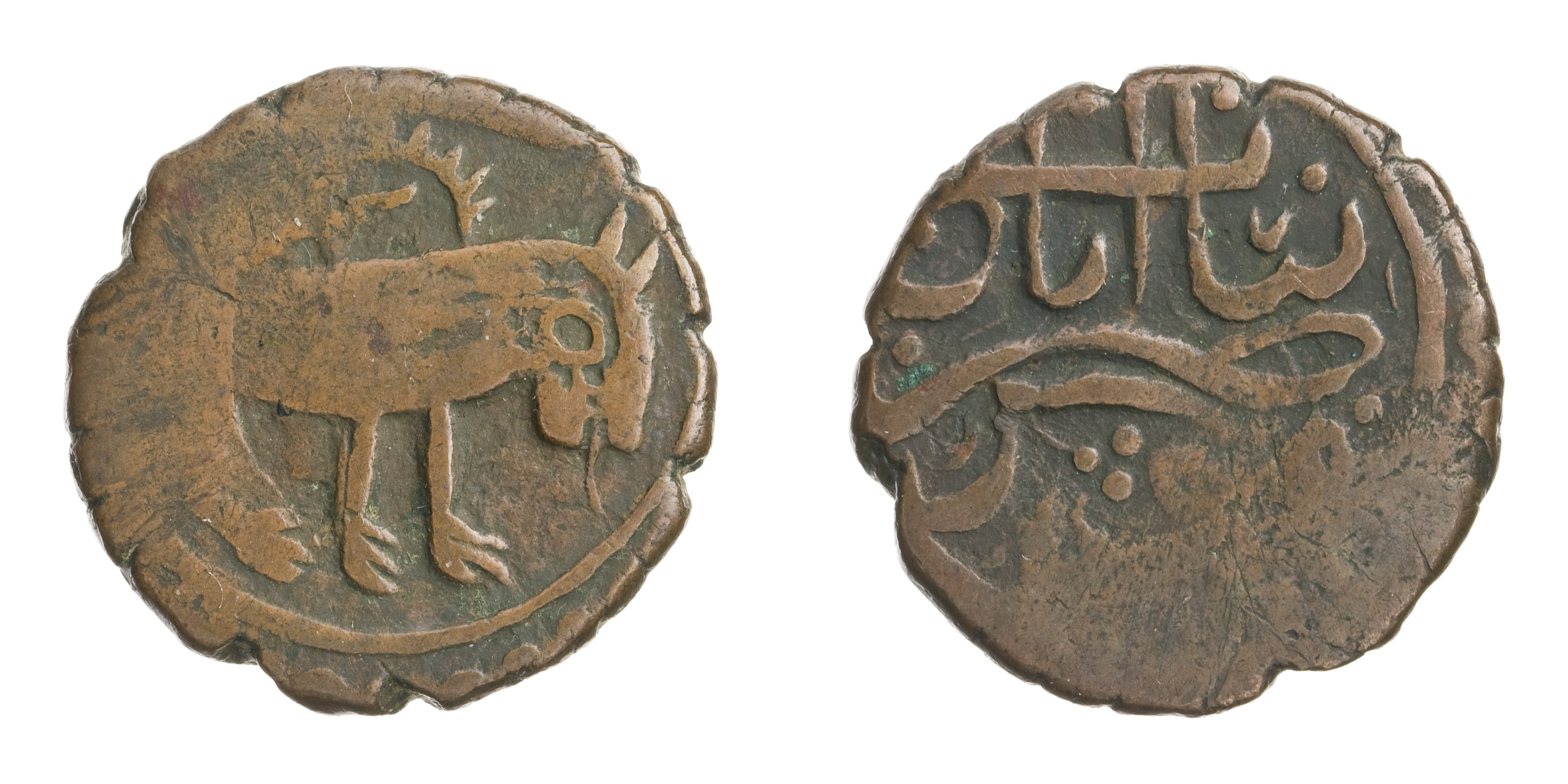
Copper coin, minted at Shusha in 1783 or 1784

Following the establishment of the Iranian rial currency in 1790, the ten-shahi stopped being used. It was later re-established by Ibrahim Khalil Khan, being minted in silver at Shusha under the name of panahabadi in honor of Panah Ali Khan. This was the first time silver coins were minted by the khans of Karabakh, a late development compared to other khanates. This was because Panah Ali Khan and Shahnazar II shared control over Shusha, with the minting of silver coins only being a possibility following the death of Shahnazar II in 1792. The panahabadi was modeled after a silver coin variant minted by the Ganja Khanate. The khans of Karabakh never issued coins under their own name, due to lacking the legitimacy of a sovereign monarch and any claims to independence.

Two types of panahabadi have been discovered, one of light weight, which corresponded to one eighth of Iranian rupia, and a heavier one, which almost weighted the same as that of 10 kopecks of the Russian empress Catherine II. According to the numismatists Alexander Akopyan and Pavel Petrov, this was not unusual, as Ibrahim Khalil displayed pro-Russian sentiment and engaged in negotiations with Russian officials, but was also under Iranian influence and tried to have his coins easily spread in Iran.

The panahabadi was still in circulation in some regions of South Caucasus and Iran up until the early 19th century. The inscription on the obverse side read "There is one God, His name is Allah, and Mohammad was His Prophet", whilst its reverse side read "minted in Panahabad." "Panahabad" was a laqab (honorific) used to refer to Shusha, albeit it was only employed in official, bureaucratic language and not as a toponym, as the word is missing from Turkic texts that date back to the fortress' construction. The panahabadi seemingly only had its own name as a result of these coins' weights being different from earlier Iranian abbasi as well as from the rial and rupia later weight systems.

Another coin type, called the sahibqirani, was first minted 1800/01 in the name of Fath-Ali Shah. A unique variant of the sahibqirani is engraved with a Persian poem; be-nām muhrum ṣāḥib az-zamānī, mukram sikke ṣāḥibqirānī ("in the name of the stamp of Sahib al-Zamani, this sahibqirani minted with honor").

The majority of the known coins minted by the Karabakh Khanate were issued during their association with Russia.

== Demographics ==
=== In the mahals ===
According to a survey conducted by the Russian Empire in 1823, the mahals (districts) (Note: According to George Bournoutian: "The term mahal can be translated as "district," "area," or "zone." Occasionally it can be translated as "quarter," although mahalle is the more appropriate term for quarter. "District" is the most accepted translation for mahal.") of Karabakh was composed of 17,101 families of villagers and nomads. Its inhabitants were either classified as Tatars, (Note: The term "Tatars", employed by the Russians, referred to Turkic-speaking Muslims (Shia and Sunni) of the South Caucasus. Unlike Armenians and Georgians, the Tatars did not have their own alphabet and used the Perso-Arabic script. After 1918 with the establishment of the Azerbaijan Democratic Republic, and "especially during the Soviet era", the Tatar group identified itself as "Azerbaijani". Prior to 1918 the word "Azerbaijan" referred to the Iranian province of Azarbaijan.) Armenians, or nomads. (Note: Turks, Kurds, and other tribes from Caucasus made up the nomads.) There were 8,445 nomadic families, 4,654 Armenian families, and 4,002 Tatar families, which means that the nomads comprised 49.38% of the population, followed by Armenians (27.22%) and then the Tatars (23.40%). The survey adds that by including Shusha, the entire population of Karabakh consisted of 18,563 families.

There were roughly 300 settlements in Karabakh, equally split between the Armenians and Tatars. There were a few more people living in Armenian villages than in Tatar ones. The number of nomad pastures was about 375. Accordingly, there were 30 families per settlement and approximately 25 families every nomad pasture. Karabakh's overall population is estimated to have been between 113,000 and 115,000 people, taking into account the estimated 5.5–6.5 person average family size in the area throughout the 19th century.

In the five mahals (Gulistan, Khachen, Jraberd, Varanda and Dizak) that later came to be known as Nagorno-Karabakh, the Armenians made up the vast majority of the population. In all the villages in the mahals of Gulistan, Khachen, and Jraberd, they were the only people there. One Tatar village existed in each of the mahals of Varanda and Dizak, while the rest of the villages were populated by Armenians. Overall, there were 1,536 Armenian families and 53 Tatar families in the five mahals, which means that in 1822, 96.67% of Nagorno-Karabakh inhabitants were Armenians, with the remaining 3.33% being Tatars.

=== Shusha ===
According to the 1823 Russian survey, 371 families were registered as living in Shusha's three quarters. The Kazanchi and Ahlisi quarters were fully made up of people with Armenian names, whilst the Tabrizi quarter was totally made up of people with Muslim names. In the Tabrizi sector of Shusha, there were 162 Muslim families, whereas the other two-quarters of Shusha were home to 209 Armenian families. The survey also includes a list of Muslim (numbering 765) and Armenian (numbering 326) families who were listed as inhabiting Shusha and its surroundings, originating from several settlements and nomadic fields in Karabakh. They either belonged to the khan's family, the clergy, the government, or the subjects of different officials. Instead of paying taxes, they provided a range of services to the monarch, the mulkdars, or the tiyuldars.

This means that in 1823, there were a total of 1,462 families living in Shusha and its surroundings, with 921 families (63.41%) of them being Muslims and 535 (36.59%) of them being Armenian.

== Revenue ==
Taxes were paid yearly in one single payment by the inhabitants of Shusha. The Armenian quarters were required to pay the most, providing 590 gold rubles and 200 kharvars ("donkey's load") of firewood every year. The Muslim quarter were required to pay 200 gold rubles and 60 kharvars of firewood.

== Administration ==
Administrative map of the Karabakh Khanate in 1822

Karabakh was a province of an imperial structure that was entirely Iranian, in the same fashion as other provinces such as Lorestan and Khorasan. In terms of structure, the Karabakh Khanate was a miniature version of Iranian kingship. In the same pattern as Afsharid and Zand rulers, Panah Ali Khan's family were all distinguished figures and served as officials. He used minbashis, yuzbashis, monshis, eshiq-aghasis, keshikchis, yasavols, nazers, and other personnel in the administration of his court and province. In exchange for tax exemption, every Karabakhi tribesman who appeared on the records enrolled the cavalry. Even tax-exempt tribes contributed financially and in kind when mercenaries were needed, but the khan covered the expenses of their equipment and horse fodder when they joined the army. The Iranologist Willem Floor uses the example of Panah Ali Khan as an argument that the character and design of Iran's political system were unaffected by increased tribal activity.

Qajar Iran contains instances that are similar to those of the iqta' (land grants) made to women in the Seljuk and Ilkhanate eras. A portion from Qom's earnings was provided to Ibrahim Khalil Khan's daughter Agha Baji and her 200 personal attendants from Karabakh after she joined the harem of Fath-Ali Shah. A lot of crown land was also given out; Abu'l-Fath Khan Javanshir, one of Ibrahim Khalil Khan's sons, was given much of the land of the Shahsevan tribe in Azerbaijan.

The administrative and literary language in Karabakh until the end of the 19th century was Persian, with Arabic being used only for religious studies, despite the fact that most of the Muslims in the region spoke a Turkic dialect. Persian was also spoken in the judiciary.

== Historiography ==
=== In contemporary historiography ===
The political history of Iran under the Safavid, Afsharid, Zand, or Qajar dynasties is the main subject of the majority of Iranian primary sources. Events taking place in remote areas like Karabakh are typically given a brief paragraph in these texts, unless the shah felt it important to visit such areas. Karabakh is only the main subject of a few chronicles, which were written by Turks of the South Caucasus, later known as Azerbaijanis. All of them, with one exception, wrote in Persian.

The Tarikh-e Qarabagh of Mirza Jamal Javanshir (died 1853) is the earliest written source that focuses on Karabakh. It focuses on political and, to a lesser extent, social and economic circumstances in Karabakh from the 1740s until 1806.

=== In Azerbaijani historiography ===
The khanates, which were marginalized in Soviet historiography as remnants of an archaic feudal institution, have been revived in post-Soviet Azerbaijani historiography. They are difficult foundational pieces for a national narrative because of their briefness, diversity, and constant factional strife. Modern Azerbaijani academia and history books refer to all of the khanates north and south of the Aras as "Azerbaijani khanates," reinventing them as the forerunners of the Azerbaijani nation. This includes the Karabakh Khanate, whose Javanshir khans are portrayed as "founding fathers". Additionally, the ethnic heritage of the nomads that lived in Karabakh, which included Turkic, Kurdish, and other Caucasian tribes, is disregarded by Azerbaijani historians, who group them together with the Tatars, considering them all to be "Azerbaijanis." However, before the 20th century, the Azerbaijanis barely constituted as an ethnic group, much less a nation. The people who lived in the present-day country of Azerbaijan identified as either Muslims of the ummah (community), or Turks, who shared a language family spread out throughout a considerable portion of Central Asia, or as Persians.

Before 1988, Azerbaijani experts did not dispute the historical Armenian presence in Nagorno-Karabakh, which changed when the Armenians of Nagorno-Karabakh demanded that their region break way from Azerbaijan. In order to defend their government's anti-Armenian policies in Nagorno-Karabakh, Azerbaijani politicians, journalists, and academics asserted that the region had never been a part of historical Armenia and that the region's Armenian residents were immigrants who had slowly relocated there after 1828. The 2003 Azerbaijani edition of the Russian survey of 1823 is an altered version of the original work; in addition to having several typographical errors, it also frequently omits key information, such as the word "Armenian," either mistakenly or on purpose.

Modern Azerbaijani scholars and historians claim that the present-day country of Azerbaijan and the Azerbaijan region in present-day northwestern Iran used to be one entity, based on arguments such as Nakhchivan and southern Karabakh being temporarily part of the administrative division of the Iranian province of Azerbaijan, the linguistical similarities between the two places, and so on. However, the vast majority of current European historians, as well as 19th century Russian and Iranian sources, consider them to have been two distinct geographical and political areas. Prior to 1918 the word "Azerbaijan" referred to the Iranian region of Azerbaijan.

== Sources ==
- Akopyan, Alexander; Petrov, Pavel (2016). "The Coinage of Īrawān, Nakhjawān, Ganja and Qarabāḡ Khānates in 1747–1827". State Hermitage: 1–9.
- Amanat, Abbas (2017). Iran: A Modern History. Yale University Press. ISBN 978-0-300-11254-2.
- Behrooz, Maziar (2023). Iran at War: Interactions with the Modern World and the Struggle with Imperial Russia. I.B. Tauris. ISBN 978-0-7556-3737-9.
- Bournoutian, George (1976). The Khanate of Erevan Under Qajar Rule: 1795–1828. University of California. ISBN 978-0-939214-18-1.
- Bournoutian, George (1994). A History of Qarabagh: An Annotated Translation of Mirza Jamal Javanshir Qarabaghi's Tarikh-e Qarabagh. Mazda Publishers. ISBN 978-1-56859-011-0.
- Bournoutian, George (1997). "Eastern Armenia from the Seventeenth Century to the Russian Annexation". In Hovannisian, Richard G. (ed.). The Armenian People from Ancient to Modern Times. Vol. 1. St. Martin's Press. pp. 81–107. ISBN 0-312-10169-4.
- Bournoutian, George (2011). The 1823 Russian Survey of the Karabagh Province. A Primary Source on the Demography and Economy of Karabagh in the First Half of the 19th Century. Mazda Publishers. ISBN 978-1-56859-173-5.
- Bournoutian, George (2016a). The 1820 Russian Survey of the Khanate of Shirvan: A Primary Source on the Demography and Economy of an Iranian Province prior to its Annexation by Russia. Gibb Memorial Trust. ISBN 978-1-909724-80-8.
- Bournoutian, George (2016b). "Prelude to War: The Russian Siege and Storming of the Fortress of Ganjeh, 1803–4". Iranian Studies. 50 (1). Taylor & Francis: 107–124. doi:10.1080/00210862.2016.1159779. S2CID 163302882.
- Bournoutian, George (2018). Armenia and Imperial Decline: The Yerevan Province, 1900–1914. Milton Park, Abingdon, Oxon: Routledge. ISBN 978-1-351-06260-2. OCLC 1037283914.
- Bournoutian, George (2021). From the Kur to the Aras: A Military History of Russia's Move into the South Caucasus and the First Russo-Iranian War, 1801–1813. Brill. ISBN 978-90-04-44515-4.
- Broers, Laurence (2019). Armenia and Azerbaijan: Anatomy of a Rivalry. Edinburgh University Press. ISBN 978-1-4744-5052-2.
- Daniel, Elton L. (2001). "Golestān Treaty". In Yarshater, Ehsan (ed.). Encyclopædia Iranica. Vol. XI/1: Giōni–Golšani. London and New York: Routledge & Kegan Paul. pp. 86–90. ISBN 978-0-933273-60-3.
- Davud, Seyyed Ali Al-i (2021). Madelung, W.; Daftary, F. (eds.). "Ibrāhīm Khalīl Khān Jawānshī". Encyclopaedia Islamica Online. Translated by Khaleeli, Alexander. Brill. doi:10.1163/1875-9831_isla_SIM_062044.
- Floor, Willem (2008). Titles and Emoluments in Safavid Iran: A Third Manual of Safavid Administration, by Mirza Naqi Nasiri. Washington, D.C.: Mage Publishers. ISBN 978-1-933823-23-2.
- Floor, Willem (2018). "Tribal Resurgence in the Eighteenth Century: A Useful Label?". In Axworthy, Michael (ed.). Crisis, Collapse, Militarism and Civil War: The History and Historiography of 18th Century Iran. Oxford University Press. pp. 151–162. ISBN 978-0-19-025033-1.
- Floor, Willem (2021). "The Safavid court and government". In Matthee, Rudi (ed.). The Safavid World. Routledge. pp. 203–224.
- Fowkes, B. (2002). Ethnicity and Ethnic Conflict in the Post-Communist World. Springer. ISBN 978-0-333-79256-8.
- Hambly, Gavin R. G. (1991). "Āghā Muhammad Khān and the establishment of the Qājār dynasty, Iran during the reigns of Fath 'Alī Shāh and Muhammad Shāh". In Avery, Peter; Hambly, Gavin R. G.; Melville, Charles Peter (eds.). The Cambridge History of Iran: From Nadir Shah to the Islamic Republic. Vol. 7. Cambridge: Cambridge University Press. pp. 104–143, 144–173. ISBN 0-521-20095-4.
- Hewsen, Robert H. (1972). "The Meliks of Eastern Armenia: A Preliminary Study". Revue des Études Arméniennes. Nouvelle série. IX: 285–329.
- Kazemzadeh, F. (1991). "Iranian relations with Russia and the Soviet Union, to 1921". In Avery, Peter; Hambly, Gavin R. G.; Melville, Charles Peter (eds.). The Cambridge History of Iran: From Nadir Shah to the Islamic Republic. Vol. 7. Cambridge: Cambridge University Press. pp. 314–350. ISBN 0-521-20095-4.
- Lambton, A.K.S. (1991). "Land Tenure and Revenue Administration in the Nineteenth Century". In Avery, Peter; Hambly, Gavin R. G.; Melville, Charles Peter (eds.). The Cambridge History of Iran: From Nadir Shah to the Islamic Republic. Vol. 7. Cambridge: Cambridge University Press. pp. 459–505. ISBN 0-521-20095-4.
- Matthee, Rudi (2008). "Safavid dynasty". Encyclopaedia Iranica.
- Matthee, Rudi; Floor, Willem; Clawson, Patrick (2013). The Monetary History of Iran: From the Safavids to the Qajars. I.B.Tauris. ISBN 978-0-85772-172-3.
- Perry, John R. (1979). Karim Khan Zand: A History of Iran, 1747–1779. University of Chicago Press. ISBN 978-0-226-66098-1.
- Swietochowski, Tadeusz (2004). Russian Azerbaijan, 1905–1920: The Shaping of a National Identity in a Muslim Community. Cambridge University Press. ISBN 978-0-521-52245-8.
- Tapper, Richard (1997). Frontier Nomads of Iran: A Political and Social History of the Shahsevan. Cambridge University Press. ISBN 978-0-521-58336-7.
- Tsibenko, Veronika (2018). "Karabakh, Nagorno". In Fleet, Kate; Krämer, Gudrun; Matringe, Denis; Nawas, John; Rowson, Everett (eds.). Encyclopaedia of Islam (3rd ed.). Brill Online. ISSN 1873-9830.
- Yilmaz, Harun (2015). "A Family Quarrel: Azerbaijani Historians against Soviet Iranologists". Iranian Studies. 48 (5). Cambridge University Press: 769–783. doi:10.1080/00210862.2015.1058642. S2CID 142718875.
