= Richard Tapper =

British anthropologist

Richard Lionel Tapper is a professor emeritus of the School of Oriental and African Studies of the University of London. He is a social anthropologist who did ethnographic field research in Iran, Afghanistan and Turkey. His publications have focussed on pastoral nomadism, relations between ethnic and tribal minorities and the state, the anthropological study of Islam, the anthropology of food, Iranian cinema, and Iranian religious politics.

== Bibliography ==
- 1979, Pasture and politics : economics, conflict, and ritual among Shahsevan nomads of northwestern Iran ISBN 0-12-683660-4
- 1983 (and 2011), The Conflict of tribe and state in Iran and Afghanistan ISBN 0-312-16232-4
- 1991, editor, Islam in modern Turkey : religion, politics, and literature in a secular state ISBN 1-85043-321-6
- 1992, editor, Some minorities in the Middle East
- 1994 (2nd edition 2001), editor, with Sami Zubaida, Culinary cultures of the Middle East = A taste of thyme: culinary cultures of the Middle East ISBN 1-86064-603-4, ISBN 1-85043-742-4
- 1997, Frontier nomads of Iran: a political and social history of the Shahsevan ISBN 0-521-58336-5
- 2000, editor, Ayatollah Khomeini and the modernization of Islamic thought
- 2002, editor, The new Iranian cinema: politics, representation and identity ISBN 1-86064-803-7
- 2002, editor, with Jon Thompson, The nomadic peoples of Iran ISBN 1-898592-24-1
- 2003, editor, with Keith McLachlan, Technology, tradition and survival: aspects of material culture in the Middle East and central Asia ISBN 0-7146-4927-9
- 2006, with Ziba Mir-Hosseini, Islam and democracy in Iran: Eshkevari and the quest for reform ISBN 1-84511-133-8
