= List of usurpers =

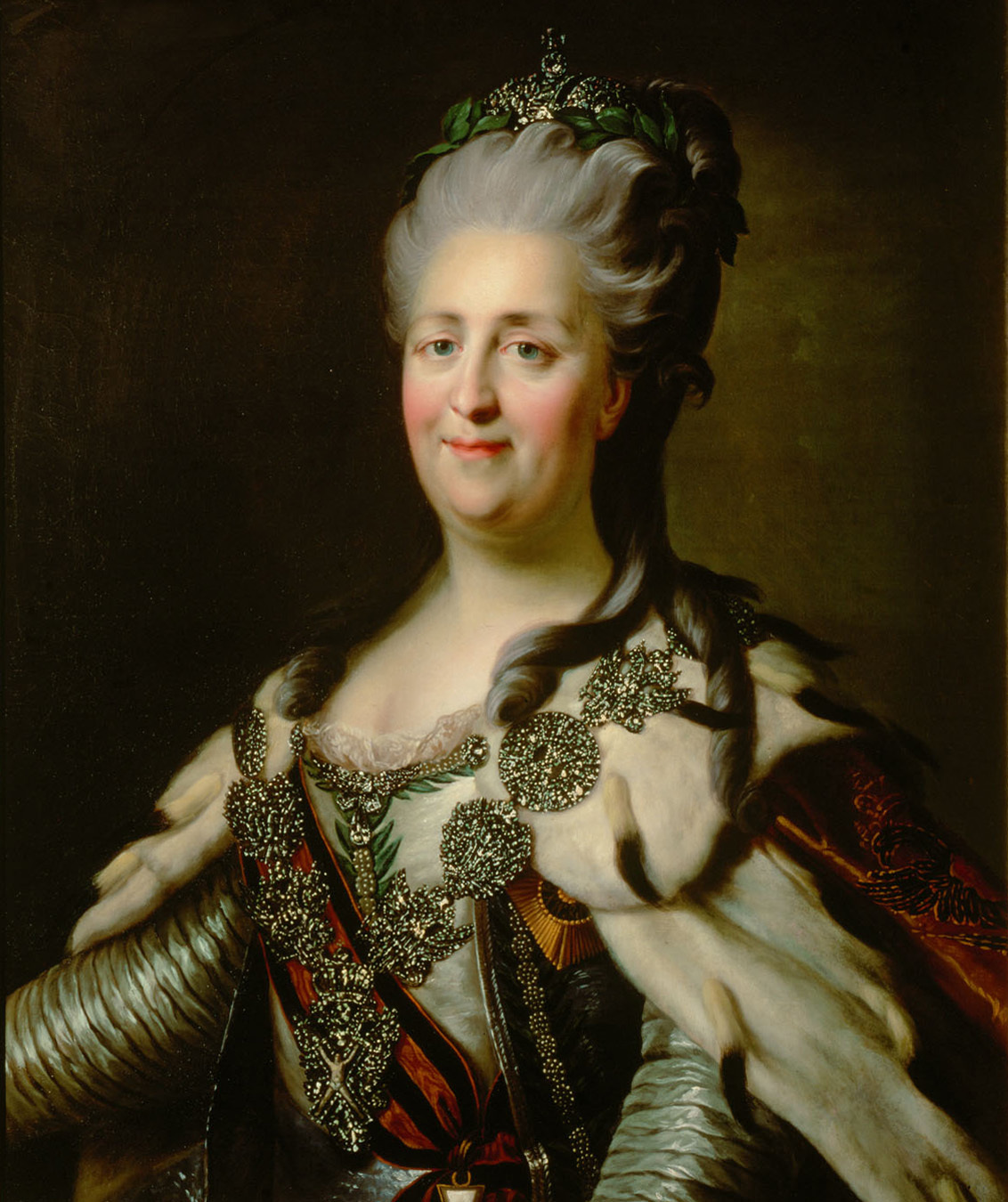
Only 6 months after he took power, Catherine the Great deposed her husband Peter III and possibly ordered his assassination. Her subsequent 34 year rule would go on to be considered a golden age of Russian art, enlightenment values, and rapid territorial expansion.

The following is a list of usurpers – illegitimate or controversial claimants to the throne in a monarchy. The word usurper is a derogatory term, often associated with claims that the ruler seized power by force or deceit rather than legal right. The term has often carried disdain to those who have been accused of being one.

== Belgium ==
Usurper	Predecessor	Reign	Comments
Leopold I of Belgium	William I of the Netherlands	1831–1865	The southern provinces of the Netherlands declared independence from the United Kingdom of the Netherlands with Leopold I being proclaimed King and sovereign ruler of the newly established Kingdom of Belgium in 1831. King William I of the Netherlands refused to accept the illegal separation of Belgium and launched the Ten Days' Campaign, a large military offensive by the Dutch to recapture the renegade southern provinces. Although initially successful for the Dutch, the French however backed the Belgians militarily and thereby forced the Dutch to accept diplomatic mediation. In 1839, the two countries signed the Treaty of London, officially recognizing the Kingdom of Belgium as an independent and sovereign state, and Leopold I as its legitimate ruler.

== China ==
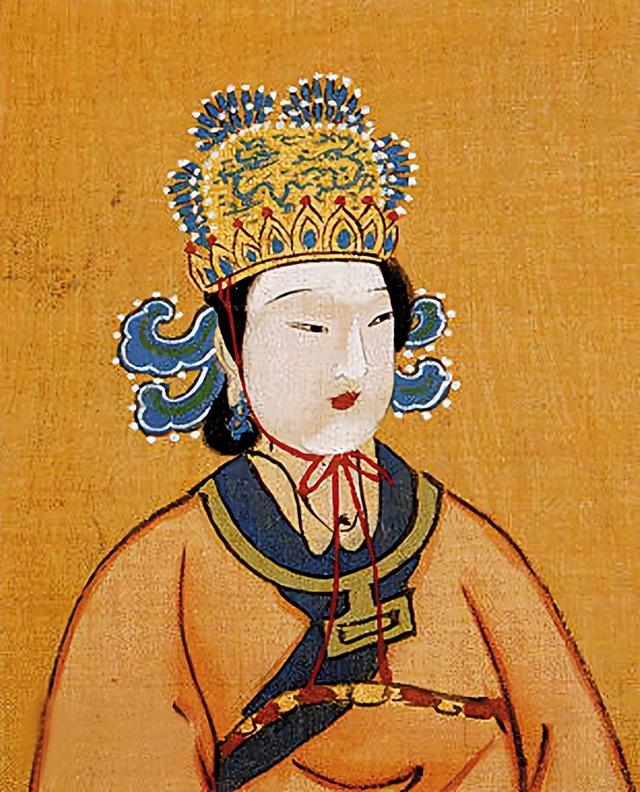
Wu Zetian is the only woman to rule as Emperor of China. She ruled informally for 30 years, and formally ruled for another 15 years after proclaiming the Wu Zhou Dynasty.

Usurper	Predecessor	Reign	Comments
Tang	King Jie of Xia	1675–1646 BC	Collapse of the Xia dynasty. Establishment of the Shang dynasty.
King Wu of Zhou	Di Xin	1046–1043 BC	Collapse of the Shang dynasty. Establishment of the Western Zhou.
King Cheng of Chu	Du'ao	671–626 BC	
King Mu of Chu	King Cheng of Chu	625–614 BC	
King Ling of Chu	Jia'ao	540–529 BC	
Helü	Liao	514–496 BC	
Duke Tai of Tian Qi	Duke Kang of Jiang Qi	386–384 BC	Collapse of the Jiang Qi. Establishment of the Tian Qi.
Qin Er Shi	Qin Shi Huang (predecessor) Fusu (rightful claimant to throne; not enthroned)	210–207 BC	Known in historiography as the Shaqiu Coup.
Wang Mang	Liu Ying	9–23	Collapse of the Western Han. Establishment of the Xin dynasty.
Emperor Wen of Cao Wei	Emperor Xian of Han	220–226	Collapse of the Eastern Han. Establishment of the Cao Wei.
Emperor Wu of Jin	Emperor Yuan of Cao Wei	266–290	Collapse of the Cao Wei. Establishment of the Western Jin.
Emperor Wudao of Huan Chu	Emperor An of Jin	404	Establishment of the Huan Chu.
Emperor Wu of Liu Song	Emperor Gong of Jin	420–422	Collapse of the Eastern Jin. Establishment of the Liu Song.
Liu Shao	Emperor Wen of Liu Song	453	
Emperor Ming of Liu Song	Liu Ziye	466–472	
Emperor Gao of Southern Qi	Emperor Shun of Liu Song	479–482	Collapse of the Liu Song. Establishment of the Southern Qi.
Emperor Ming of Southern Qi	Xiao Zhaowen	494–498	
Emperor Wu of Liang	Emperor He of Southern Qi	502–549	Collapse of the Southern Qi. Establishment of the Liang dynasty.
Emperor Wenxuan of Northern Qi	Emperor Xiaojing of Eastern Wei	550–559	Collapse of the Eastern Wei. Establishment of the Northern Qi.
Hou Jing	Xiao Dong	551–552	Establishment of the Hou Han.
Emperor Xiaomin of Northern Zhou	Emperor Gong of Western Wei	557	Collapse of the Western Wei. Establishment of the Northern Zhou.
Emperor Wu of Chen	Emperor Jing of Liang	557–559	Collapse of the Liang dynasty. Establishment of the Chen dynasty.
Emperor Xuan of Chen	Chen Bozong	569–582	
Emperor Wen of Sui	Emperor Jing of Northern Zhou	581–604	Collapse of the Northern Zhou. Establishment of the Sui dynasty.
Emperor Yang of Sui	Emperor Wen of Sui (predecessor) Yang Yong (rightful claimant to throne; not enthroned)	604–618	
Yuwen Huaji	Yang Hao	618–619	Establishment of the Xu.
Emperor Gaozu of Tang	Yang You	618–626	Establishment of the Tang dynasty.
Wang Shichong	Yang Tong	619–621	Collapse of the Sui dynasty. Establishment of the Zheng.
Emperor Taizong of Tang	Emperor Gaozu of Tang (predecessor) Li Jiancheng (rightful claimant to throne; not enthroned)	626–649	Known in historiography as the Xuanwu Gate Incident.
Wu Zetian	Emperor Ruizong of Tang	690–705	Interregnum of the Tang dynasty. Establishment of the Wu Zhou.
Emperor Zhongzong of Tang	Wu Zetian	684, 705–710	Collapse of the Wu Zhou. Restoration of the Tang dynasty. Known in historiography as the Shenlong Coup.
Emperor Taizu of Later Liang	Emperor Ai of Tang	907–912	Collapse of the Tang dynasty. Establishment of the Later Liang.
Zhu Yougui	Emperor Taizu of Later Liang	912–913	
Emperor Mingzong of Later Tang	Emperor Zhuangzong of Later Tang	926–933	Known in historiography as the Xingjiao Gate Incident.
Emperor Liezu of Southern Tang	Emperor Rui of Yang Wu	937–943	Collapse of the Yang Wu. Establishment of the Southern Tang.
Emperor Taizu of Later Zhou	Emperor Yin of Later Han	951–954	Collapse of the Later Han. Establishment of the Later Zhou.
Emperor Taizu of Song	Emperor Gong of Later Zhou	960–976	Collapse of the Later Zhou. Establishment of the Northern Song. Known in historiography as the Coup at Chen Bridge.
Emperor Taizong of Song	Emperor Taizu of Song	976–997	
Wanyan Liang	Emperor Xizong of Jin	1150–1161	
Emperor Lizong of Song	Emperor Ningzong of Song (predecessor) Zhao Hong (rightful claimant to throne; not enthroned)	1224–1264	
Yongle Emperor	Jianwen Emperor	1402–1424	Known in historiography as the Jingnan Campaign.
Jingtai Emperor	Emperor Yingzong of Ming	1449 – 1457	The Jingtai Emperor and Ming government deposed Emperor Yingzong as he was held captive by the Mongols.
Emperor Yingzong of Ming	Jingtai Emperor	1435–1449, 1457–1464	Known in historiography as the Duomen Coup.

== Egypt ==
Usurper	Predecessor	Reign	Comments
Amasis II	Apries	570 BC – 526 BC	

== England ==
Oliver Cromwell, after years of political turmoil following his signing of the death warrant of Charles I, reluctantly took power as Lord Protector.

Usurper	Predecessor	Reign	Comments
Beorhtric	Cynewulf	786 - 802	In 786 Cynewulf was murdered by Cyneheard the Ætheling, brother of Sigeberht whom Cynewulf had deposed. Beorhtric then became king of Wessex with support from Offa of Mercia. It is not known whether Beorhtric played a role in the murder.
Sweyn Forkbeard	Æthelred the Unready	1013 - 1014	In 1013, Sweyn Forkbeard invaded England with a large army, possibly to avenge the St Brice's Day massacre, where his sister and brother-in-law were allegedly killed. The invasion was successful, and Æthelred went into exile. Sweyn was crowned king of England, but died a few weeks later. His son Canute would later invade and conquer England in 1016.
Canute the Great	Edmund Ironside	1016 - 1035	After the death of Sweyn Forkbeard, Æthelred the Unready was brought back to the throne of England, however he only ruled for two years before dying of unknown causes. His eldest son Edmund Ironside was crowned king, however later that year Sweyn's son, Canute invaded England. After being defeated, Edmund agreed to cede all of England, save Wessex, to Canute. Edmund Ironside then died of unknown causes, and Canute was crowned King of England.
William the Conqueror	Harold Godwinson	1066 - 1087	When Edward the Confessor died, he had named his brother-in-law Harold Godwinson as his successor, the Witan agreed and crowned him king, legitimising his claim. William the Conqueror made up a claim that he was promised the throne by Edward during the time when Edward was in exile in Normandy, but this did not happen. William the Conqueror decided to invade England in 1066, defeated Harold Godwinson at The Battle of Hastings, then made himself king of England. The Witan never officially accepted his claim, thus making him illegitimate and a usurper.
Stephen	Henry I	1135–1154	Henry I named his daughter Matilda his heir, and she was recognised as such by the barons of England. On Henry's death, Stephen took the crown before Matilda learned that her father was dead, which led to 20 years of civil war.
Henry IV	Richard II	1399–1413	A period of crisis emerged in 1398–1399 under Richard II as he enacted revenge on leading nobles for a dispute ten years previously. He took action against the Lords Appellant, murdering a leader and banishing Henry Bolingbrooke. On the death of Bolingbrooke's father, John of Gaunt, the son wished to return to claim his inheritance as the Duke of Lancaster, which Richard II denied. Henry returned from his exile in France whilst Richard II was away in Ireland. With the support of prominent Northern noble families, Henry took the throne.
Edward IV	Henry VI	1461–1470 1471–1483	After the death of his father, Richard of York at the Battle of Wakefield in 1460, Edward took over leadership of the Yorkist faction. His father had been declared the king's heir by parliament, but Edward took the further step of proclaiming himself king in March 1461. He subsequently defeated Lancastrian forces at the Battle of Towton, forcing Henry VI into exile in Scotland.
Richard III	Edward V	1483–1485	When his brother King Edward IV died in April 1483, Richard was named Lord Protector of the realm for Edward's eldest son and successor, the 12-year-old Edward V. Arrangements were made for Edward's coronation on 22 June 1483; but, before the young king could be crowned, the marriage of his parents was declared bigamous and therefore invalid, making their children officially illegitimate and thus barring them from inheriting the throne. On 25 June, an assembly of Lords and commoners endorsed a declaration to this effect and proclaimed Richard the rightful king.
Henry VII	Richard III	1485–1509	Forces under Henry Tudor won the Battle of Bosworth Field, during which Richard III was killed. Henry then became Henry VII and married the daughter of Edward IV, which is claimed to have ended the War of the Roses, though relatives of Richard made various attempts to remove him from power.
Oliver Cromwell	Charles II	1653–1658	Ordered the execution of King Charles I after his defeat in the Second English Civil War, then defeated his son Charles II in the Third English Civil War. Took control of the Commonwealth of England as Lord Protector. Period of Cromwell's and his son's rule known as the English Protectorate.
William III and Mary II	James II and VII	1689–1702	James II and VII fled after the arrival of William and Mary along with their army. This became known as the Glorious Revolution.

== France ==
Usurper	Predecessor	Reign	Comments
Pepin the Short	Childeric III	751–768	
Napoleon Bonaparte	The Directorate	1799–1814	In the Coup d'état of 18 Brumaire, (9 November 1799) Napoleon overthrew the Constitution of the Year III and established his rule as First Consul, and five years later as Emperor.
Napoleon Bonaparte	Louis XVIII	1815–1815	Hundred Days
Louis Philippe I	Henri V	1830–1848	Louis Philippe took the throne in the aftermath of the July Revolution, which had resulted in the abdication of King Charles X in favour of his grandson, a young child.

== Gwynedd (Wales) ==
Usurper	Predecessor	Reign	Comments
Dafydd, Rhodri, & Cynan	Hywel ab Owain	1170–1195	Llywelyn the Great, with the senior legitimate claim, overthrew his uncles

== Hawaii ==
See also Aliʻi nui of Hawaii.

Usurper	Predecessor	Reign	Comments
Kamaiole	Kanipahu	1245–1255	
Alapaʻi Nui	Keaweʻīkekahialiʻiokamoku	1725–1754	

== Holy Roman Empire ==
Usurper	Predecessor	Reign	Comments
Maria Theresa	Charles VI	1745–1765 de jure; 1740–1780 de facto	Her father Charles VI illegally changed his father's (Leopold I) Mutual Pact of Succession (1703) from the senior-most-in-line, being his elder brother's (Joseph I), daughter Maria Josepha, as heir to the Holy Roman Empire, to that of his own daughter, Maria Theresa, with his Pragmatic Sanction of 1713. This very act precipitated the War of the Austrian Succession (1740–1748), which continued on through and resulted into the Seven Years' War (1756–1763).

== Iberian Peninsula ==
Usurper	Predecessor	Reign	Comments
Rodrigo	Wittiza	710-711	
Mauregato	Silo	783-789	
Ordoño IV	Sancho I	951–956	
Ferdinand the Great	Bermudo III	1037-65	
Sancho II	García II and Alfonso VI	1071-1072	
Henry II	Peter the Cruel	1366-1367 1369-1379	
Michael I	Mary II	1828-1834	See Liberal Wars
Isabella II	Fernando VII	1813-1833	See Carlist Wars
Amadeo I	Isabella II	1833-1868	See Glorious Revolution (Spain)

== Iran (Persia) ==
Usurper	Predecessor	Reign	Comments
Mahmud Hotak	Sultan Husayn	1722–1725	Mahmud, an Afghan ruler of the Hotak dynasty who overthrew the heavily declined Safavid dynasty to briefly become the Shah of Persia from 1722 until his death in 1725.
Ashraf Hotak	Mahmud Hotak	1725–1729	Ashraf, also an Afghan ruler of the Hotak dynasty, who took the throne in 1725 after killing his cousin Mahmud Hotak. Ashraf himself was killed in the Battle of Damghan in 1729 thereby restoring the rule by the Safavid dynasty (Tahmasp II, son of Sultan Husayn, subsequently became Shah of Persia).
Nader Shah Afshar	Abbas III	1736–1747	Nader, from humble origin and member of the Afshar tribe, became an important Persian army leader during the reign of Tahmasp II, Safavid Shah of Persia. In 1732 he forced Tahmasp III to abdicate in favour of the Shah's baby son, Abbas III, to whom Nader became regent (de facto ruler). In 1736, he proclaimed himself Shah of Persia in which Abbas III was killed. Nader Shah Afshar was founder and first Shah of the Afsharid dynasty.
Adel Shah Afshar	Nader Shah Afshar	1747–1748	Adel, member of the Afsharid dynasty and nephew of Nader Shah Afshar, took the throne in 1747 after rebelling against his uncle who was killed in the process.
Ebrahim Afshar	Adel Shah Afshar	1748	Ebrahim, member of the Afsharid dynasty and brother of Adel Shah Afshar, took the throne in 1748 after deposing, blinding & then killing his brother.
Shahrokh Mirza Afshar	Ebrahim Afshar	1748– 1750, 1750–1796	Shahrokh, member of the Afsharid dynasty and grandson of Nader Shah Afshar, took the throne in 1748 after the deposition and murder of Ebrahim Afshar. His throne was restored in 1750, but at the end of his life, the Afsharid rule was confined to a small local state in Khorasan (with the bulk of his former empire divided between the Zand dynasty, the Qajar dynasty, and tribes from Afghanistan, Pakistan, Georgia and the Caucasus). In 1796, Shahrokh died from torture ordered by Qajar ruler Agha Mohammad Khan (who himself became Shah of Persia in 1789).
Suleiman II of Persia	Shahrokh Mirza Afshar	1749–1750	Suleiman II, pretender to the former Safavid throne, took the throne in 1749 after deposing & blinding Shahrokh Afshar. Suleiman II himself was blinded and removed from the throne in 1750, whereby Shahrokh Afshar was restored to his power.
Ali Mardan Khan Bakhtiari	Shahrokh Mirza Afshar	1750–1751	In 1750, Chahar Lang chieftain Ali Mardan Khan Bakhtiari and the Zand chieftain Karim Khan conquered the former Safavid capital Isfahan and installed Ismail III, the last prince of the Safavid dynasty, as a figurehead and "puppet shah of Persia" in order to legitimize their rule over Persia. Ali Mardan took the title of Vakil-e, i.e. "deputy" or "regent" of the Persian state, which ended with the overthrown of his regime in 1751.
Karim Khan Zand	Ali Mardan Khan Bakhtiari	1751–1779	After killing Ali Mardan Khan Bakhtiari in 1751, Karim Khan Zand appointed himself Vakil-e (regent) of the Persian state. However, albeit de facto ruler of all of Persia (except for Khorasan which was still ruled by Shahrokh Mirza Afshar), he never officially adopted the title of Shah for himself. Although, in retrospection he can be considered founder and first Shah of the Zand dynasty. Ismail III continued to be "puppet shah of Persia" in order to legitimize Karim Khan's rule over Persia; he was kept in safe custody at the stronghold of Abadeh till his death in 1773.
Zaki Khan Zand	Karim Khan Zand	1779	With the natural death in 1779 of Karim Khan Zand, ruler of the Zand dynasty, a power struggle followed. Karim Khan's brother Zaki Khan Zand installed Mohammad Ali Khan Zand, the younger son of Karim Khan who was also his son-in-law, as Shah of the Zand dynasty; although according to male primogeniture Abol-Fath Khan Zand, the eldest son of Karim Khan should have become Shah. Later on, both sons Mohammad Ali Khan and Abol-Fath Khan Zand were declared co-shahs, but they were only puppet rulers with nominal power; the real power was taken into the hands of their uncle Zaki Khan who was the de facto ruler. However, his reign was short-lived being murdered by rebellious tribal leaders after a few months.
Sadeq Khan Zand	Abol-Fath Khan Zand	1779–1781	With Zaki Khan Zand being killed in June 1779 and Mohammad Ali Khan Zand died of a heart attack in the same month, Abol-Fath Khan Zand was proclaimed the sole official (3rd) Shah of the Zand dynasty by his uncle Sadeq Khan Zand. However, Sadeq held the real power with Abol-Fath only as puppet-monarch not taking part in the administration of the empire. This situation did not however suit Sadeq Khan for long; after two months he proclaimed himself Shah with deposing, blinding & later killing his nephew Abol-Fath.
Ali-Morad Khan Zand	Sadeq Khan Zand	1781–1785	Ali-Morad Khan, a distant member of the Zand dynasty, took the throne in 1781 after capturing the capitol Shiraz and murdering Sadeq Khan Zand, the fifth Shah of the Zand dynasty.
Jafar Khan Zand	Ali-Morad Khan Zand	1785–1789	Jafar Khan Zand, son of the fifth Shah Sadeq Khan Zand, took the throne in 1785 after murdering Ali-Morad Khan Zand, the sixth Shah of the Zand dynasty.
Sayed Morad Khan Zand	Jafar Khan Zand	1789	Sayed Morad Khan, son of the sixth Shah Ali-Morad Khan Zand, took the throne in 1789 after murdering Jafar Khan Zand, the seventh Shah of the Zand dynasty.
Lotf Ali Khan Zand	Sayed Morad Khan Zand	1789–1794	On hearing of the murder of his father Jafar Khan Zand, Lotf Ali Khan marched to the capital Shiraz and took the throne in 1789 after forcing to surrender and executing Sayed Morad Khan, eighth Shah of the Zand dynasty.
Agha Mohammad Khan Qajar	Lotf Ali Khan Zand	1789–1797	Agha Mohammad Khan was a eunuch who served at a Persian court and was enthroned as the Shah of Persia in 1789, but was not officially crowned until March 1796, having deposed, blinded & then killed Lotf Ali Khan (9th and last Shah of the Zand dynasty) in 1794, and killing Shahrokh Mirza Afshar (last Shah of the Afsharid dynasty) in 1796. Agha Mohammad Khan Qajar was founder and first Shah of the Qajar dynasty, and with him Persia became again centralized and unified.
Reza Shah Pahlavi	Ahmad Shah Qajar	1925–1941	Reza Shah Pahlavi was a former brigadier-general of the Persian Cossack Brigade who came to power after the 1921 Persian coup d'état and deposition of Ahmad Shah Qajar, the last Shah of the Qajar dynasty. Reza Pahlavi was founder and became first Shah of the Pahlavi dynasty in 1925.
Mohammad Reza Pahlavi	Reza Shah Pahlavi	1941–1979	Mohammad Reza Pahlav took the throne after the forced abdication of his father Reza Shah Pahlavi during the Anglo-Soviet invasion of Iran on 16 September 1941. He was the second and last Shah of the Pahlavi dynasty, being himself overthrown by the Iranian Revolution on 11 February 1979.

== Japan ==
Usurper	Predecessor	Reign	Comments
Emperor Tenmu	Emperor Kōbun	672–686	
Tokugawa Ieyasu	Toyotomi Hideyoshi	1603-1605	Japan has not had an official shogunate functionally ruling the country since the collapse of Ashikaga shogunate in 1573. Hideyoshi's position as Taiko is nominally a civilian position held from the Emperor (as he is barred from Shogunal title due to being of peasant origin). Ieyasu would succeed in defeating the bulk of Hideyoshi's loyalists at the Battle of Sekigahara in 1600, demolishing Toyotomi influence and disinheriting Hideyoshi's son Hideyori.

== Korea ==
Usurper	Predecessor	Reign	Comments
Sindae of Goguryeo	Chadae of Goguryeo	165–179	
Micheon of Goguryeo	Bongsang of Goguryeo	300–331	
Bojang of Goguryeo	Yeongnyu of Goguryeo	642–668	
Seong of Balhae	Dae Won-ui	793–794	
Taejo of Goryeo	Gung Ye	918–943	Establishment of the Goryeo dynasty.
Hyeonjong of Goryeo	Mokjong of Goryeo	1009–1031	
Myeongjong of Goryeo	Uijong of Goryeo	1170–1197	
Gangjong of Goryeo	Huijong of Goryeo	1211–1213	
Chungmok of Goryeo	Chunghye of Goryeo	1344–1348	
Chang of Goryeo	U of Goryeo	1389–1389	
Gongyang of Goryeo	Chang of Goryeo	1389–1392	
Taejo of Joseon	Gongyang of Goryeo	1392–1398	Collapse of the Goryeo dynasty. Establishment of the Joseon dynasty.
Sejo of Joseon	Danjong of Joseon	1417–1468	
Jungjong of Joseon	Yeonsangun of Joseon	1506–1544	Known in historiography as the Jungjong coup
Injo of Joseon	Gwanghaegun of Joseon	1595–1649	

== Mesopotamia ==
Usurper	Predecessor	Reign	Comments
Tiglath-Pileser III	Shalmeneser III	745–727 BCE	Neo-Assyrian. Ended a civil war, reformed the military, and reignited the Neo-Assyrian campaigns of conquest.

== Netherlands ==
Usurper	Predecessor	Reign	Comments
William I, Prince of Orange	Philip II of Spain	1572–1584	With the "Act of Abjuration" (Plakkaat van Verlatinghe) during the Dutch Revolt, the northern provinces of the Netherlands declared them-self independent from the rule of King Philip II of Spain, who also was Lord of the Netherlands. Prince William I of Orange, leader of the Dutch Revolt, was proclaimed Stadtholder (thereby de facto ruler) of the renegade Netherlands in 1572. This intensified the Eighty Years' War in which Philip II deployed his armies and tried to regain control over most of these provinces. William of Orange was assassinated in 1584 by Balthasar Gérard, a loyalist to Philip II.
Maurice, Prince of Orange	Philip III of Spain	1585–1625	In 1585, Prince Maurice of Orange was proclaimed Stadtholder (thereby de facto ruler) of the renegade Netherlands after the death of his father William of Orange. During this period, King Philip III of Spain was the de jure Lord of the Netherlands.
Frederick Henry, Prince of Orange	Philip IV of Spain	1625–1647	In 1625, Prince Frederick Henry of Orange was proclaimed Stadtholder (thereby de facto ruler) of the renegade Netherlands after the natural death of his brother Maurice of Orange. During this period, King Philip IV of Spain was the de jure Lord of the Netherlands.
William II, Prince of Orange	Philip IV of Spain	1647–1650	In 1647, Prince William II of Orange was proclaimed Stadtholder (thereby de facto ruler) of the renegade Netherlands after the natural death of his father Frederick Henry of Orange. With the Peace of Münster in 1648, the Dutch republic was recognized as an independent and sovereign state, herewith officially legitimizing and solidifying the rule of William II in this country.

== Norway ==
Usurper	Predecessor	Reign	Comments
Sverre Sigurdsson	Magnus Erlingsson	1184–1202	

== Russia ==
Usurper	Predecessor	Reign	Comments
Marina Mniszech and False Dmitry I	Feodor II	1605–1606	Beginning of the so called Time of Troubles, a period of political turmoil in Russia.
Elizabeth	Ivan VI	1741–1762	
Catherine the Great	Peter III	1762–1796	Deposed her husband Peter III and possibly ordered his assassination after taking power.

== Sweden ==
Usurper	Predecessor	Reign	Comments
Erik Jedvardsson	Sverker the Elder	1156–1160	Involvement in Sverker's murder is uncertain.
Magnus Henriksen	Erik Jedvardsson	1160–1161	
Karl Sverkerson	Magnus Henriksen	1161–1168	
Knut Eriksson	Karl Sverkersson	1168–1195	
Erik Knutsson	Sverker the Younger	1208–1216	
Knut Långe	Erik Eriksson	1229–1234	
Charles IX	Sigismund	1604–1611	As regent 1599–1604.
Charles XIII	Gustaf IV Adolf	1809–1818	As regent March–May 1809

== Thailand ==
Usurper	Predecessor	Reign	Comments
Worawongsathirat	Yodfa	1548	His kingship is not accepted by most traditional historians.

== Vietnam ==
Usurper	Predecessor	Reign	Comments
Dương Tam Kha	Ngô Quyền	944–950	
Ngô Xương Văn	Dương Tam Kha	951–965	
Mạc Đăng Dung	Le Chieu Tong	1527–1529	

== See also ==
- List of Roman usurpers
- List of Byzantine usurpers
- Lists of monarchs who lost their thrones
- List of coups and coup attempts by country
