= Sadeq Khan Zand =

Shah of Iran from 1779 to 1781

- Shahanshah
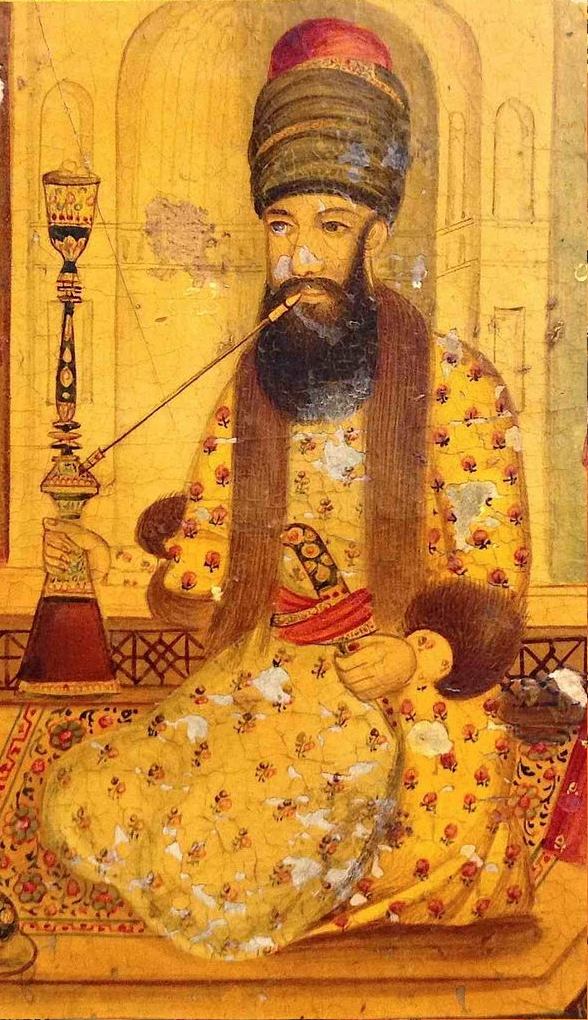
- Sadeq Khan Zand

Shah of Iran
- Reign: 22 August 1779 – 14 March 1781
- Predecessor: Abol-Fath Khan Zand
- Successor: Ali-Morad Khan Zand
- Born: 1728; Pari, Ottoman Empire (present-day Iran)
- Died: 1781 (aged 52–53); Shiraz, Zand Iran
- Issue: Jafar Khan
- Dynasty: Zand
- Father: Inaq Khan Zand
- Mother: Begum Agha Zanganeh
- Religion: Shia Islam

Sadeq Khan Zand (Persian: صادق‌خان زند; d. 1781), also known as Mohammad Sadeq, was the fourth Shah of the Zand dynasty of Iran from 22 August 1779 until 14 March 1781.

== Biography ==
=== Background and early life ===
Sadeq Khan belonged to the Zand tribe, a small and little-known tribe of Laks, a branch of Lurs who may have been originally Kurdish. The Zands were concentrated on the villages of Pari and Kamazan in the Malayer district, but were also found roaming in the central Zagros ranges and the countryside of Hamadan. Sadeq Khan was the son of a certain Inaq Khan Zand, and had 3 sisters, a brother named Karim Khan Zand, and two half-brothers named Zaki Khan Zand and Eskandar Khan Zand. In 1722, the Safavid Empire was on the verge of collapsing—Isfahan and most of central and east Iran had been seized by the Afghan Hotak dynasty, while the Russians had conquered many cities in northern Iran. Around the same time, the Ottoman Empire took advantage of Iran's decadence to conquer a large number of western frontier districts. There they faced bold opposition from the local clans, including the Zands, who under the chief Mehdi Khan Zand harassed their forces and stopped them from advancing further into Iran.

In 1732, Nader Qoli Beg, who had restored Safavid rule in Iran and had become the de facto ruler of the country, made an expedition into the Zagros ranges of western Iran in order to subdue the tribes, whom he considered bandits. He first defeated the Bakhtiari and the Feylis, whom he forced to mass-migrate in larger numbers into Khorasan. He then baited Mehdi Khan Zand and his forces out of their stronghold at Pari, killing the latter and 400 of his Zand kinsmen. The surviving members of the tribe were forced to mass-migrate under the leadership of Inaq Khan Zand and his younger brother Budaq Khan Zand to Abivard and Dargaz, where its able members were incorporated into Nader's army.

=== Service under Karim Khan Zand ===
In 1774, the Mamluk governor of the Ottoman province of Iraq, Omar Pasha began meddling in the affairs of his vassal principality of Baban, which since the death of his predecessor Sulayman Abu Layla Pasha in 1762, had fallen more and more under the influence of the Zand governor of Ardalan, Khosrow Khan Bozorg. This made Omar Pasha dismiss the Baban ruler Muhammad Pasha, and appoint Abdolla Pasha as its new ruler. This, and Omar Pasha's seizure of the remnants of Iranian pilgrims who had died during the plague that ravaged Iraq in 1773—and his exaction of payment from Iranian pilgrims to visit the holy Shia places of Najaf and Karbala, gave Karim Khan the casus belli to declare war against the Ottomans.

There were also other reasons for Karim Khan to declare war—Mashhad, where the holy Imam Reza shrine was situated, was not under Zand control, which thus meant that free entry to the sanctuaries of Iraq was of more significance to Karim Khan than it had been to the Safavid and Afsharid shahs. The Zand army was discontent, and sought to restore their reputation after Zaki Khans humiliating blunders on the Hormuz Island. Most importantly, Basra was a prominent trading port, which had surpassed the competing city of Bushehr in Fars in 1769, when the East India Company dropped the city for Basra.

The Zand forces under Ali-Morad Khan Zand and Nazar Ali Khan Zand shortly clashed with the Pasha's forces in Kurdistan, where they kept them at bay, whilst Sadeq Khan, with an army of 30,000, besieged Basra in April 1775. The Arab tribe al-Muntafiq, which was allied with the governor of Basra, quickly withdrew without any effort to reject Sadeq Khan from passing through the Shatt al-Arab, whilst the Banu Ka'b and the Arabs of Bushehr supplied him with boats and supplies.

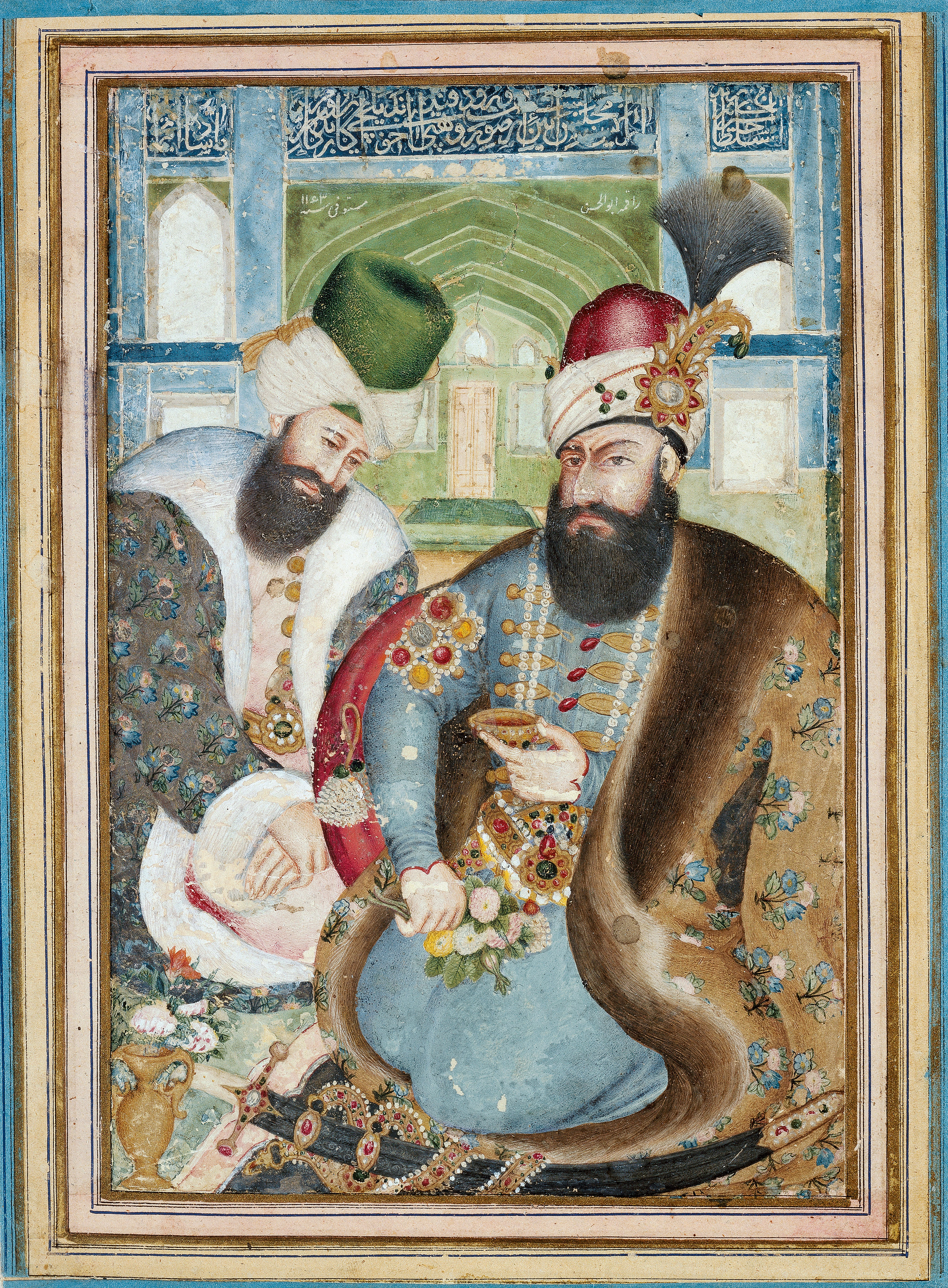
Karim Khan Zand with the Ottoman envoy Vehbi Efendi.

Suleiman Agha, who was the commander of the fort of Basra, resisted Sadeq Khan's forces with resolve, which made the latter establish an encirclement, which would last over a year. Henry Moore, who belonged to the East India company, assaulted some of Sadeq Khan's stockpile boats, tried to block the Shatt al-Arab, and then departed to Bombay. A few months later, in October, a group of ships from Oman gave supplies and military aid to Basra, which considerably lifted the morale of its forces. However, their combined attack the next day occurred to be wavering—the Omani ships eventually chose to withdraw back to Muscat during winter, in order to avoid further losses.

Reinforcements from Baghdad arrived shortly afterwards, which was repelled by the Khaza'il, a Shia Arab tribe which was allied with the Zand forces. In the spring of 1776, the narrow encirclement by Sadeq Khan had resulted in the defenders being on the fringe of famine—a considerable portion of the Basra forces had deserted Suleiman Agha, whilst the rumours of a possible uprising, made Suleiman Agha surrender on 16 April 1776.

Even though the able Ottoman Sultan Mustafa III (r. 1757–1774) had died and was succeeded by his incompetent brother Abdul Hamid I (r. 1774–1789), and the recent Ottoman defeat to the Russians, the Ottoman response to the Ottoman–Iranian war was unusually slow. In February 1775, before the announcement of the siege of Basra had approached Constantinople, and while the Zagros front was temporarily peaceful, the Ottoman ambassador, Vehbi Efendi, was sent to Shiraz. He reached Shiraz around the same time Sadeq Khan besieged Basra, "but was not empowered to negotiate over this new crisis."

In 1778, Karim Khan had made a compromise with the Russians for a cooperative offensive into eastern Anatolia. However, the invasion never took place due to Karim Khan's death on 1 March 1779, after having been ill for six months, most likely due to tuberculosis. Sadeq Khan and his forces shortly abandoned Basra.

=== Reign ===
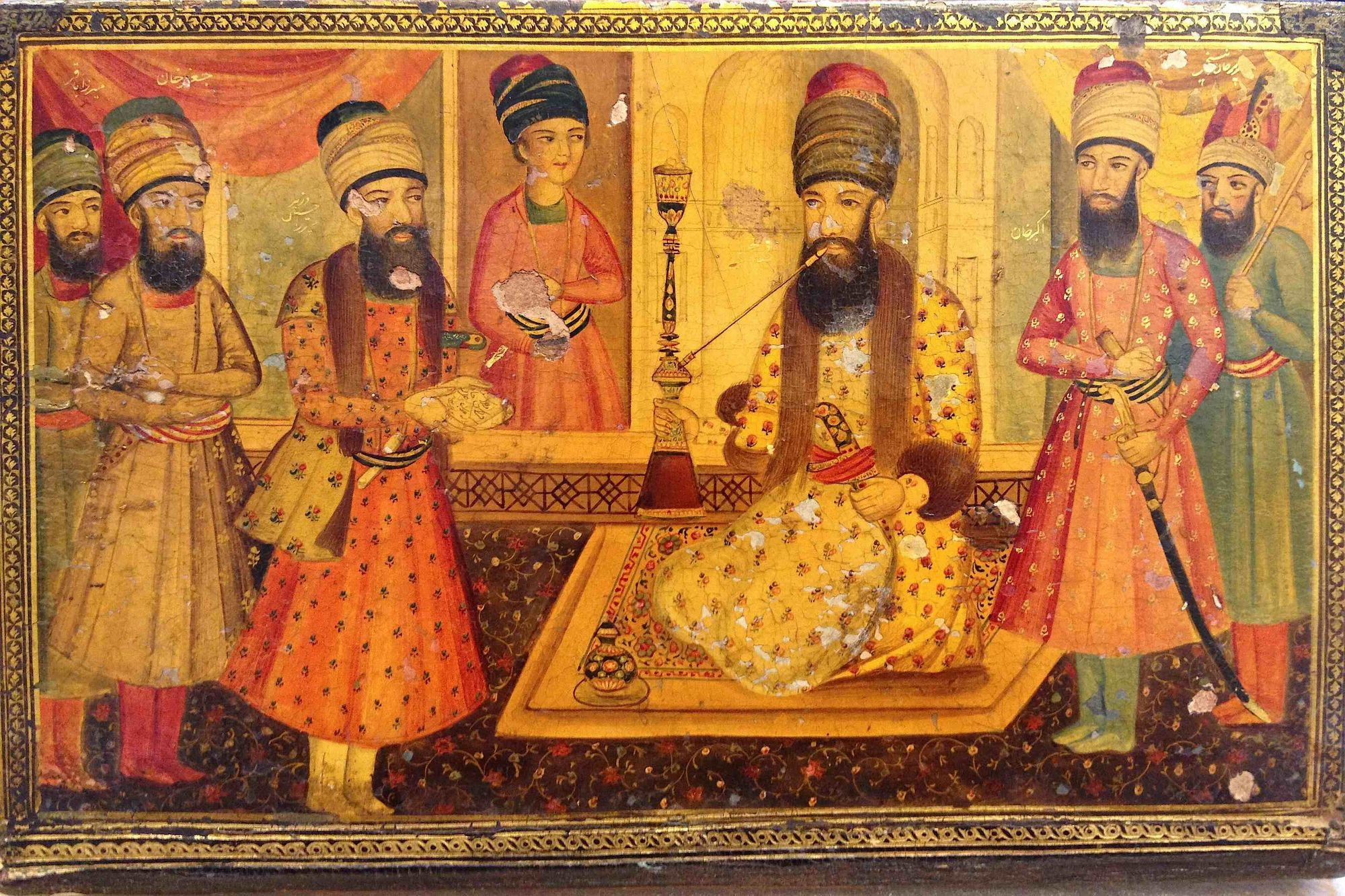
Court of Sadeq Khan Zand.

Karim Khan's death in March 1779 was followed by a power struggle. His sons Mohammad Ali Khan and Abol-Fath Khan Zand were declared co-rulers, but their rule was only nominal; real power was in the hands of their uncle Zaki Khan. After Zaki Khan's murder by the people of Isfahan, there was widespread rebellion. Ali-Morad Khan Zand, the commander of the royal army, who was sent to undermine a Qajar attack in the north, betrayed Abol-Fath and left the capital defenseless. Sadeq Khan, supported by the Nizari imam Abū-l-Ḥasan ʻAlī, collected an army in Kerman and invaded Shiraz, where he faced little resistance. On 22 August 1779, Abol-Fath died from a heart attack and he became the ruler of Iran.

He died in the Zand Palace in the capital city of Shiraz, his cause of death is not known, but Ali-Morad succeeded him.

== Sources ==
- Perry, John R. (1991). "The Zand dynasty". The Cambridge History of Iran, Vol. 7: From Nadir Shah to the Islamic Republic. Cambridge: Cambridge University Press. pp. 63–104. ISBN 9780521200950.
- Perry, John R. (2010). "Zand dynasty". Encyclopaedia Iranica, Vol. XV, Fasc. 6.
- Perry, John R. (2011). "Karim Khan Zand". Encyclopaedia Iranica, Vol. XV, Fasc. 6. pp. 561–564.
- Perry, John R. (2012). Karim Khan Zand: a history of Iran, 1747–1779. Simon and Schuster. ISBN 978-1-78074-199-4.
- Shaw, Stanford (1991). "Iranian relations with the Ottoman Empire in the eighteenth and nineteenth centuries". The Cambridge History of Iran, Vol. 7: From Nadir Shah to the Islamic Republic. Cambridge: Cambridge University Press. pp. 297–314. ISBN 9780521200950.

Sadeq Khan Zand Zand dynasty Born: ? Died: 1781
Iranian royalty
Preceded by Abol-Fath Khan Zand	Shah of Iran; 1779–1781	Succeeded by Ali-Morad Khan Zand
