= Zaki Khan Zand =

Contender for the Iranian throne (died 1779)

Zaki Khan Zand زکی‌خان زند

Shah of Iran
- Predecessor: Karim Khan Zand
- Successor: Abol-Fath Khan Zand
- Born: Malayer
- Died: 1779; Izadkhast
- Issue: Akbar Khan Zand; Mohammad Khan Zand
- Dynasty: Zand dynasty
- Father: Bodegh Khan Zand
- Mother: Begum Agha Zanganeh

Zaki Khan Zand (died 6 June 1779) was an Iranian military commander and contender for the throne. A member of the Zand dynasty of Iran, Zaki Khan, though he never became the ruler of Iran, managed to exert power over the country during the three months between the death of his half-brother Karim Khan Zand, on 2 March 1779, and his own brutal death.

== Origins and early years ==
Zaki Khan was born into the Zand tribe, who had been uprooted by Nader Shah from their ancestral lands near Hamadan, in the central Iranian region of Lorestan, and settled in Northern Khorasan. At Nader's death in 1747, the Zand returned to Lorestan, and their leader Karim Khan managed to gain vast political power, taking control of Isfahan in 1750, where they installed a puppet underage shah, Ismail III. Karim Khan never took the title of shah but had himself addressed as "vakil" (deputy) even as he was the ruler over most of Central and Western Iran. Zaki Khan was doubly related to Karim Khan: he was his first cousin through their fathers, and his half-brother on the mother's side. The fortunes of Zaki Khan followed those of his half-brother and protector, and he was considered one of his main generals.

== First rebellion and years as a general (1763–1779) ==
However, Iranian sources note that Zaki Khan was by then already infamous for his cruelty and opportunism. In 1763, returning from the last campaign against Azad Khan Afghan in Azerbaijan, seemingly disappointed by a lack of recognition from the ruler, Zaki Khan seized the former Safavid capital of Isfahan for himself, and mercilessly exploited its population. When Karim Khan learned of these exactions, he personally marched on Isfahan. Zaki Khan fled from him to Dezful, in Khuzestan, recruiting Bakhtiari warriors on the way, and then allying himself with the rebellious governor of Dezful. After a year of unsuccessful fighting and negotiations, Zaki Khan eventually begged for the mercy of his brother, and received it.

During the next fifteen years, Zaki Khan remained one of the main generals of Karim Khan. He led forces to submit principalities on the Persian Gulf coast, the main one a naval expedition against Oman in 1773, that ended in total failure and Zaki's disgrace. Two years later however, he was assigned a punitive expedition against the Qajar stronghold of Mazandaran, by the Caspian Sea. There, he succeeded, and left a reputation of brutal terror.

== Three months of power ==
Zaki Khan was a major participant in the struggles for political power that followed the death of Karim Khan on 2 March 1779. Karim Khan died naturally after a long illness, so Zaki Khan, as well as many others, was not caught off guard. He had managed in the previous years to marry his daughter to Mohammad-Ali Khan, Karim Khan's second son, who was still a child. By the time of Karim Khan's death, he was logically at the head of the faction pushing for Mohammad Ali to be proclaimed nominal ruler. The elder son, Abol-Fath Khan, only 13 years old, also had supporters among the main members of the royal family. However, as soon as Karim Khan was dead, Zaki Khan had most of them killed, and Abol Fath imprisoned. Among Abol Fath's supporters, only Sadeq Khan Zand managed to escape the capital, Shiraz. Mohammad Ali was proclaimed nominal ruler, and Zaki Khan regent with full power over the Empire. But the children's mother intervened in favor of Abol Fath, and Zaki Khan, to win her support, had to accept that both sons of Karim Khan would be invested with the supreme honor.

The rule of Zaki Khan was contested from the start. First, the Qajar prince Agha Mohammad Khan, whom Karim Khan had retained as a hostage in Shiraz to prevent further rebellions from his powerful Northern clan, escaped and headed for his stronghold. To catch him, Zaki Khan sent his nephew, Ali-Morad Khan. However, as soon as he reached Isfahan, Ali Morad Khan mutinied against his uncle and gave his allegiance to Abol Fath. Sadeq Khan was gathering an army in the South-East with a similar purpose. Zaki Khan decided to deal with Ali Morad Khan first, and led an army towards Isfahan.

== Death and legacy ==
On his way to Isfahan, Zaki Khan committed atrocities at the settlement of Izadkhvast. But this time, he went so far that even his own men were shocked. A group of tribal leaders among them eventually murdered him as he was resting in his tent still in the village of Izadkhwast. After his elimination, the war would carry on between Sadeq Khan and Ali Morad Khan, who would both claim the throne in the following years.

His youngest son Akbar Khan Zand, that he had left in charge of Shiraz, tried to pursue his father's career and ambition after Zaki Khan's death, but was blinded and killed in 1782 by his cousin, the future shah Jafar Khan.

== Sources ==
- W. William Bayne Fisher; P. Avery; G. R. G. Hambly; C. Melville (10 October 1991). The Cambridge History of Iran. Vol. VII. Cambridge University Press. pp. 80–93. ISBN 978-0-521-20095-0.
