= Anwar Shirazi =

Iranian prince and poet (1768–1801)

Crown Prince of Iran
- Tenure: 1768-1794
- Successor: Abbas Mirza (as prince)
- Born: 1768; Shiraz, Zand Iran
- Died: 1801 (aged 32–33); Nahavand, Qajar Iran
- Father: Karim Khan Zand
- Mother: Daughter of Mohammad Khan Kalhor
- Religion: Shia Islam

Ebrahim Khan Zand (Persian: ابراهیم‌خان زند; 1768–1801) Also known as Anwar Shirazi (Persian: انور شیرازی) was an Iranian Zand prince and poet. He was the youngest son of Karim Khan Zand (r. 1751–1779). After his father's death and the internal conflict amongst the Zand family members that swarmed quickly after, he was blinded by Alimorad Khan Zand at 11 years old. After the conquest of the Zand dynasty by the Qajars, Agha Mohammad Khan had him sent from Shiraz to Sari, but during the time of Fath-Ali Shah Qajar he went to the Ottoman Empire (Baghdad province) to visit the holy Shia shrines. He then settled in Nahavand until his death in 1801.

== Sources ==
- Perry, John R. (1979). Karim Khan Zand: A History of Iran, 1747–1779. University of Chicago Press. ISBN 978-0226660981.
- Radmanesh, Fatima (2019). "انور شیرازی". The Great Islamic Encyclopaedia (in Persian).
