= Akbar Khan Zand =

Iranian prince

Akbar Khan Zand اکبرخان زند
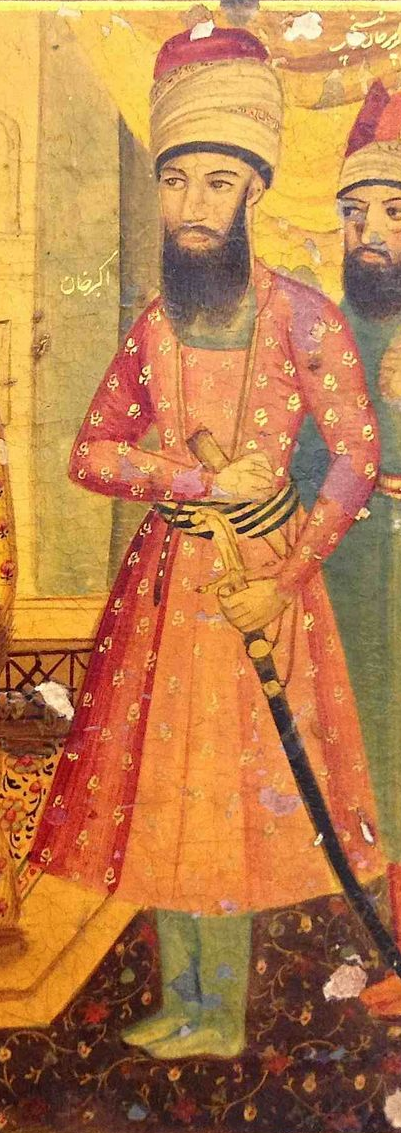
- Illustration of Akbar Khan Zand
- Died: 1782; Tehran
- Dynasty: Zand dynasty
- Father: Zaki Khan Zand

Akbar Khan Zand (Persian: اکبر خان زند, romanized: Akbar Khān Zand) was an Iranian prince from the Zand dynasty, who played a lively and vicious role in the fratricidal power conflict that took place after the death of Karim Khan Zand in 1779.
