= Mohammad Khan Zand =

Last claimant of the Zand dynasty

Mohammad Khan Zand محمد خان زند
- Died: Tehran
- Dynasty: Zand dynasty
- Father: Zaki Khan Zand

Mohammad Khan Zand was the son of Zaki Khan and the last claimant of the Zand dynasty in Iran during the 18th century..

He lived in Basra during the reign of Agha Mohammad Khan Qajar. When he learned of Agha Mohammad Khan's death, he went to Persia and gathered an army of Afghans and Lors and was able to conquer Isfahan. In a battle between the armies of Fath Ali Shah Qajar and the prisoners near Isfahan, the Qajars won and were able to open it after the siege of the city. Mohammad Khan Vali was able to escape the battle and took refuge in the Bakhtiari Mountains. Fath Ali Shah also ordered the Zand prisoners to be destroyed by mortar fire, But he died from the punishment of Isfahanis for collaborating with Mohammad Khan with the mediation of the Friday prayer leader of this city.

Mohammad Khan then gathered an army near Borujerd but was again defeated by the Qajars, and his forces dispersed. He was finally arrested in Dezful while he was fleeing to Basra. He was blinded and sent as a captive to Tehran.
