= Abol-Fath Khan Zand =

Khan of Iran in 1779

Khan of Iran
- Reign: 6 March 1779 – 22 August 1779
- Predecessor: Mohammad Ali Khan Zand
- Successor: Sadeq Khan Zand
- Born: c. 1755
- Died: 1787; Zand Palace, Shiraz, Zand Iran
- Burial: Shah Cheragh, Shiraz, Iran
- Spouse: Shahnawaz Khan's daughter
- Dynasty: Zand
- Father: Karim Khan Zand
- Religion: Shia Islam

Abol-Fath Khan Zand (Persian: ابوالفتح خان زند; 1755/1756 – 1787) was the third khan of Zand Iran, ruling from 6 March 1779 until 22 August 1779.

== Biography ==
After Karim Khan's death in 1779, two factions emerged, one supporting Abol-Fath, the other his younger brother, Mohammad Ali Khan Zand. Both were still children, and were pawns in the game of power. Karim Khan's brother Zaki Khan Zand managed to proclaim Mohammad Ali Khan, his own son-in-law, as khan of the Zand dynasty but soon after, he also made Abol-Fath joint ruler of Iran. Both Mohammad Ali and Abol-Fath only held nominal power during their reigns, as their uncle was the effective master of the government. As another brother of Karim Khan, Sadeq Khan Zand, had left Shiraz, then the capital, and was gathering an army in Kerman ostensibly in support of Abol-Fath Khan, Zaki Khan even had Abol-Fath imprisoned.

To add to the political trouble, right after Karim Khan's death, the Qajar prince Agha Mohammad Khan Qajar, who had until then been a hostage in Shiraz, in order to prevent an outbreak of war between the Qajars, who still dominated the North of the country, and the Zands, escaped promptly and reached his stronghold of Mazandaran. Subsequently, he took command of his tribe in Astarabad, and declared independence from the Zand Khan. To counter that move, Zaki Khan dispatched the Iranian army under the command of his nephew, Ali-Morad Khan Zand against the Qajar lord. Soon however, it appeared that Ali-Morad Khan had rebelled against him and captured Isfahan. On the other hand, Zaki Khan had levied high taxes on the landlords and put to death and tortured anyone who had resisted. Subsequently, his own army rebelled and killed Zaki Khan as he was marching on Isfahan, on 6 June 1779.

Meanwhile, Abol-Fath's other uncle Sadeq Khan had by then returned to Shiraz from Kerman with an army. Upon reception of the news of Zaki Khan's demise, on 19 June 1779, he had Abol-Fath proclaimed sole official ruler of Iran. Sadeq held the real power, while Abol-Fath, according to most accounts, was satisfied with a life of pleasures, and did not take any part in the administration of the Empire. This situation did not however suit Sadeq Khan for long. Only two months after Abol-Fath's installation, on 22 August 1779, Sadeq Khan had him deposed and was proclaimed Shah instead. Abol-Fath was blinded, either on Sadeq Khan's orders, or two years later when Shiraz fell to Ali-Morad Khan. He died in 1787, aged 32.

== Sources ==
- Perry, John R. (2011). "Abū l-Fatḥ Khān Zand". In Fleet, Kate; Krämer, Gudrun; Matringe, Denis; Nawas, John; Rowson, Everett (eds.). Encyclopaedia of Islam (3rd ed.). Brill Online. ISSN 1873-9830.
- W. William Bayne Fisher; P. Avery; G. R. G. Hambly; C. Melville (10 October 1991). The Cambridge History of Iran. Vol. VII. Cambridge University Press. p. 93. ISBN 978-0-521-20095-0.
- Busse, Heribert (15 December 1983). "Abu'l-Fath Khan Zand". Encyclopedia Iranica. Archived from the original on 6 June 2015.
- Rulers of Iran
- "History of Iran, Part XIII: Afshar and Zand Dynasties". Iranology. 2004. Archived from the original on 21 February 2006.

Abol-Fath Khan Zand Zand dynasty Born: 1755 Died: 1787
Iranian royalty
Preceded by Mohammad Ali Khan Zand	Khan of Iran; 1779	Succeeded by Sadeq Khan Zand
