= Begum Agha Zanganeh =

Mother of Karim Khan Zand

Begum Agha Zanganeh (Persian: بیگم آغا زنگنه; fl. 1751) was the mother of shah Karim Khan Zand (r. 1751–1779) and Sadeq Khan Zand (r. 1779–1781)

She was a woman from the Zanganeh, a Kurdish tribe. She was married to Inaq Khan Zand and, after his death, to his brother Budaq.

Zanganeh had great influence during the reign of her son.
