= Mohammad-Ali Khan Zand =

Khan of Iran in 1779

Khan of Iran
- Reign: 6 March 1779 – 19 June 1779
- Predecessor: Karim Khan Zand
- Successor: Abol-Fath Khan Zand
- Born: c. 1760
- Died: After 1792; Zand Palace, Shiraz, Zand Iran
- Dynasty: Zand
- Father: Karim Khan Zand
- Religion: Shia Islam

Mohammad-Ali Khan Zand (Persian: محمدعلی خان زند; born c. 1760; died after 1792) was the second khan of Zand Iran, ruling from 6 March 1779 until 19 June 1779.

== Early life ==
In 1760, Mohammad-Ali Khan was born to Karim Khan Zand and his wife who was a Jewish convert to Islam. He was the third son of Karim Khan and the second surviving son at the time of his father's death in 1779.

== Marriage ==
Mohammad-Ali Khan married the daughter of Zaki Khan Zand.

== Ascending the throne ==
After the death of Karim Khan Zand on 2 March 1779, Iran plunged into a bitter power struggle ensued among the Zand nobles. Karim Khan's brother Zaki Khan Zand declared the 19-year-old Mohammad-Ali, who was also his son-in-law, as the second ruler of the Zand dynasty in Shiraz. Soon thereafter, Abol-Fath Khan Zand, the elder son of Karim Khan was made his joint ruler. In practice, however, Zaki Khan himself seized control of the state administration. Zaki Khan's rule, together with Mohammad-Ali Khan and Abol-Fath Khan, lasted about 100 days, i.e., until 19 June 1779 when he was killed by his own forces; and Abol-Fath Khan became the sole ruler.

== Later years ==
In 1782, Ali-Morad Khan Zand captured Shiraz; and by his order, Mohammad-Ali Khan was blinded. Mohammad-Ali Khan died after 1792.

== Sources ==
- Busse, H. (1983). "ABU'L-FATḤ KHAN ZAND". In Yarshater, Ehsan (ed.). Encyclopædia Iranica (Online ed.). Encyclopædia Iranica Foundation. Archived from the original on 2015-06-06.
- Perry, John (1991). "The Zand dynasty". The Cambridge History of Iran, Vol. 7: From Nadir Shah to the Islamic Republic. Cambridge: Cambridge University Press. pp. 63–104. ISBN 9780521200950.
- Perry, John R. (1984). "AKBAR KHAN ZAND". Encyclopædia Iranica, Online Edition.
- Perry, J. R. (2000). "ZAND DYNASTY". Encyclopædia Iranica, Online Edition.
- Rajabi, Parviz (2010). کریم خان زند و زمان او [Karim Khan Zand and His Era] (in Persian).

Mohammad-Ali Khan Zand Zand dynasty Born: 1760 Died: 1792
Iranian royalty
Preceded by Karim Khan Zand	Khan of Iran; 1779	Succeeded by Abol-Fath Khan Zand
