= Zand dynasty =

Iranian royal dynasty (1751–1794)

Zand
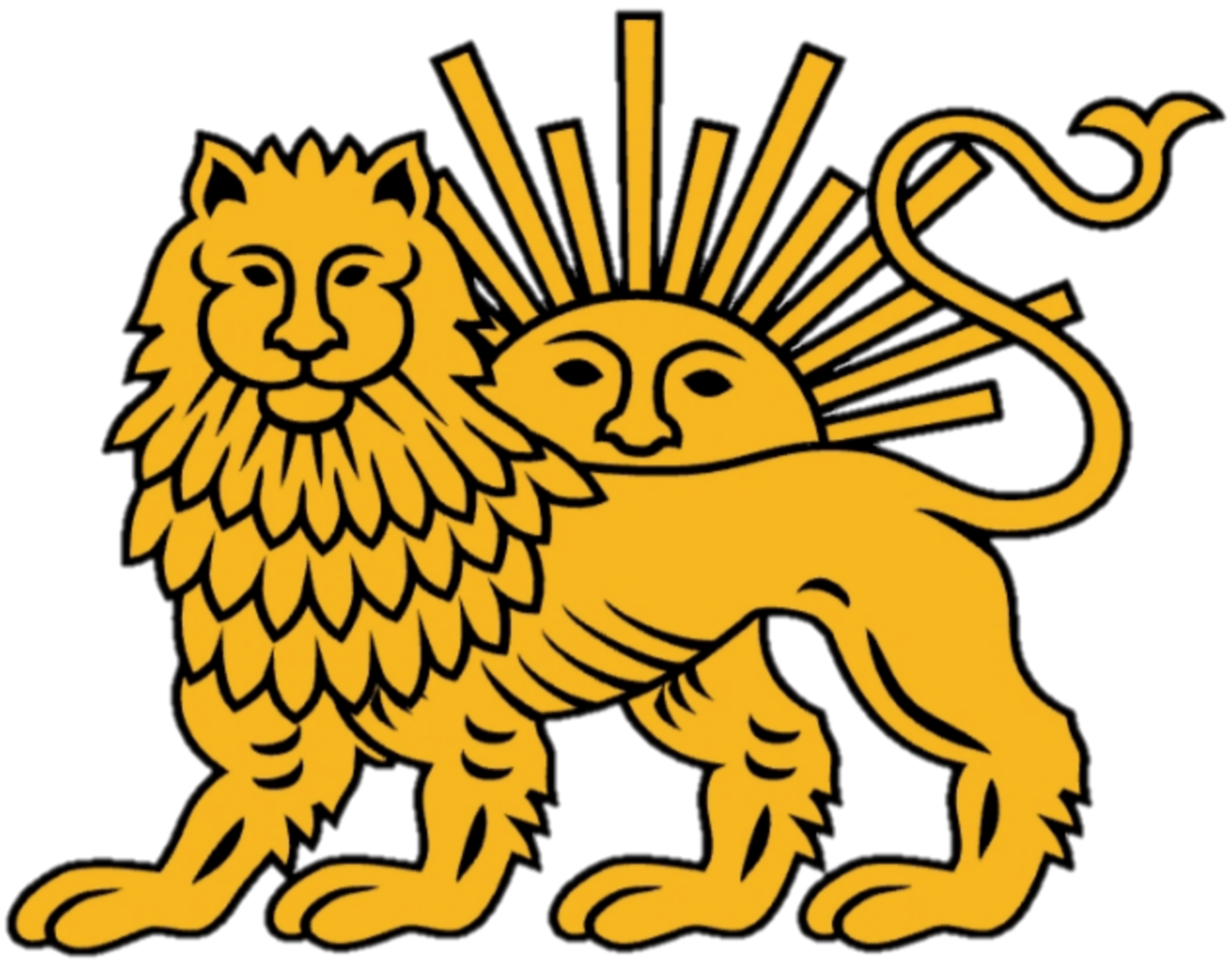
- Emblem of Karim Khan Zand

- Dynastic flag of Karim Khan Zand
- Parent family: Zand tribe
- Country: Zand Iran
- Origin: Pari, Iran
- Founded: 1751
- Founder: Karim Khan Zand
- Final ruler: Lotf Ali Khan Zand
- Final head: Mohammad Khan Zand
- Titles: Vakil ol-Ra'aya; Shah of Iran (Note: The title was only used by Lotf Ali Khan Zand)
- Traditions: Twelver Shia Islam
- Deposition: 1794

The Zand dynasty (Persian: دودمان زندیان, romanized: Dudemān-e Zandiyān) was an Iranian dynasty founded by Karim Khan Zand (r. 1751–1779) of the Zand tribe of the Laks who ruled over Zand Iran.

== Zand rulers ==
No.	Name	Picture	Lifespan	Reigned from	Reigned until	Reign duration (Note: Full years reigned (for durations of less than 1 year, the total number of days reigned))	Succession
1	Karim Khan		c. 1699–1779 (aged c. 80)	1751	1779	28 years	Seized power over much of Iran
2	Mohammad-Ali Khan	—	1760–c. 1792 (aged c. 32)	1779 (22 March)	1779 (19 June)	<1 year (89 days)	Sons of Karim Khan. The two were initially joint co-rulers before Abol-Fath Khan ruled alone.
3	Abol-Fath Khan	—	1755–1787 (aged 32)	1779 (22 March)	1779 (22 August)	<1 year (153 days)	Sons of Karim Khan. The two were initially joint co-rulers before Abol-Fath Khan ruled alone.
4	Sadegh Khan		c. 1705–1781 (aged c. 76)	1779 (22 August)	1781 (14 March)	1 year	Brother of Karim Khan
5	Ali-Morad Khan		c. 1740–1785 (aged c. 45)	1781 (14 March)	1785 (11 February)	3 years	Member of the 'Hazāra' branch of the Zand family
6	Jafar Khan		c. 1735–1789 (aged c. 54)	1785 (11 February)	1789 (23 January)	3 years	Son of Sadegh Khan
7	Seyd Morad Khan		c. 1765–1789 (aged c. 24)	1789 (23 January)	1789 (8 May)	<1 year (105 days)	Cousin of Ali-Morad Khan. Mutinied against Jafar Khan (leading to Jafar's death) and opposed the accession of Jafar's son, Lotf Ali Khan.
8	Lotf Ali Khan		c. 1769–1794 (aged c. 25)	1789 (8 May)	1794 (November)	5 years	Son of Jafar Khan.
Zand dynasty			c. 1699–1794 (aged c. 95)	1751	1794	43 years	

== Family tree ==
Budaq Khan	Begum Agha Zanganeh	Inaq Khan
Allah Morad Khan	Bay Agha II	Zaki Khan Zand	Karim Khan Zand; 1751–1779	Sadegh Khan Zand; 1779–1781
Koda Morad Khan	Ali-Morad Khan Zand; 1782–1785	Akbar Khan Zand	Abol-Fath Khan Zand; 1779	Mohammad Ali Khan Zand; 1779	Jafar Khan Zand; 1785–1789
Seyd Morad Khan; 1789	Rostam Khan Zand	Lotf Ali Khan; 1789–1794

== Sources ==
- Busse, H. (1983). "ABU'L-FATḤ KHAN ZAND". In Yarshater, Ehsan (ed.). Encyclopædia Iranica (Online ed.). Encyclopædia Iranica Foundation.
- Perry, J. R. (2000). "ZAND DYNASTY". Encyclopædia Iranica, Online Edition.
- Perry, J. R. (2011). "KARIM KHAN ZAND". In Yarshater, Ehsan (ed.). Encyclopædia Iranica (Online ed.). Encyclopædia Iranica Foundation.
- Rajabi, Parviz (2010). کریم خان زند و زمان او [Karim Khan Zand and His Era] (in Persian).
- Spuler, Bertold (1977). Rulers and Governments of the World: Volume 2: 1492 to 1929. Bowker. ISBN 0-85935-009-6.

— Royal house — Zand dynasty Founding year: 1751 Deposition: 1794
Preceded by House of Afsharid	Ruling house of Iran; 1751–1794	Succeeded by House of Qajar
