= Jafar Khan Zand =

Shah of Iran from 1785 to 1789

Jafar Khan Zand جعفر خان زند
- Khan
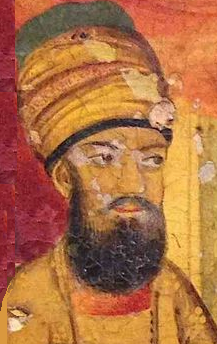
- Portrait of Jafar Khan Zand

Shah of Iran
- Reign: February 18, 1785 – January 23, 1789
- Predecessor: Ali-Morad Khan Zand
- Successor: Seyd Morad Khan
- Born: Malayer
- Died: 23 January 1789; Zand Palace, Shiraz
- Issue: Lotf Ali Khan
- Dynasty: Zand
- Father: Sadeq Khan Zand
- Religion: Shia Islam

Jafar Khan Zand, (Persian: جعفر خان زند) was the sixth shah (king) of the Zand dynasty of Iran from 1785 to 1789. He was the son of Sadegh Khan Zand, who was removed from the throne in Shiraz by Ali Murad Khan, who had previously taken Isfahan for himself.

== Biography ==
=== Early life ===
In February 1781, the Zand prince Ali Murad Khan put Jafar Khan's father Sadiq Khan Zand and all his brothers to death when he invaded Shiraz. Jafar Khan was the only one who was spared, because he privately had reached an agreement with Ali Murad Khan. While Ali Murad Khan was in northern Iran (Mazandaran) in 1785, Jafar Khan took the opportunity to besiege Isfahan. Ali Murad Khan then marched towards the city in order to defend it, but died on 11 February at Murchakhur, a town near Isfahan.

=== Reign ===
Jafar Khan then crowned himself as the new Zand king in Isfahan. At the same time, the Qajar warlord Agha Mohammad Khan marched towards Isfahan. Jafar Khan then sent his men to stop his advance towards the city, but they withdrew at Qom without putting up any resistance. Jafar Khan then sent an even larger Zand army towards Agha Mohammad Khan, who defeated the army near Kashan. Jafar Khan then fled to Shiraz. Agha Mohammad captured Kashan and shortly afterwards arrived to Isfahan, where he discovered what was left of the Zand treasure and Jafar Khan's harem. The Qajar troops then looted the city of Isfahan.

In 1786, while Agha Mohammad Khan was in northern Iran, Jafar Khan quickly marched towards Isfahan and re-captured it. He then sent troops towards Kashan and Qom, while he marched towards Hamadan. He was, however, defeated by local tribal chieftains, such as a certain Khosrow Khan and Mohammad Hosayn Khan Qaragozlu. Jafar Khan then withdrew to Isfahan. When Agha Mohammad Khan heard about the Zand invasion of Isfahan and its surroundings, he quickly marched towards the city, which made Jafar Khan retreat back to Shiraz once again. In 1788, Agha Mohammad advanced closely to Shiraz, where he hoped to bait Jafar Khan out of Shiraz, which was strongly fortified, making it very hard to besiege. Unfortunately for Agha Mohammad Khan, Jafar Khan stayed in the city, which made Agha Mohammad Khan return to Isfahan, where appointed his brother Ali Qoli as its new governor, thus succeeding Jafar Qoli Khan. He then left for Tehran.

With Agha Mohammad once again in the north, Jafar Khan began raising an army to prepare another attack against Isfahan and its surroundings. When Ali Qoli found out about it, he sent a group of tribesmen to a city south to Isfahan, named Qumishah. However, Jafar Khan managed to easily defeat them. Ali Qoli thereafter retreated to Kashan. Agha Mohammad Khan, learning of this, rapidly marched towards Isfahan, which made Jafar Khan withdraw to Shiraz once again. Agha Mohammad Khan, who was too unconfident to try and capture Shiraz, then went back to Tehran. Jafar Khan was murdered on 23 January 1789 by Ali Murad Khan's son Sayed Murad Khan. After his death, a four-month civil war began between several Zand princes who fought for succession to the throne. Jafar Khan's son Lotf Ali Khan emerged being the victor in this civil war in May.

== Issue ==
Sons

- Prince Lotf Ali Khan Zand
- Prince Khosrow Khan Zand
- Prince Abbas Qoli Khan Zand
- Prince Najaf Ali Khan Zand

Daughter(s)

- Princess Maryam Begum Zand

== Sources ==
- Hambly, Gavin R.G (1991). "Agha Muhammad Khan and the establishment of the Qajar dynasty". The Cambridge History of Iran, Vol. 7: From Nadir Shah to the Islamic Republic. Cambridge: Cambridge University Press. pp. 104–144. ISBN 9780521200950.

Jafar Khan Zand Zand dynasty Born: ? Died: 23 January 1789
Iranian royalty
Preceded by Ali Murad Khan Zand	Shah of Iran; 1785–1789	Succeeded by Seyd Morad Khan Zand
