= Piruz, Iran =

Village in Hamadan province, Iran

Piruz Persian: پيروز
- Village
- Location within Iran
- Coordinates: 34°08′07″N 49°02′43″E
- Country: Iran
- Province: Hamadan
- County: Malayer
- District: Zand
- Rural District: Kamazan-e Vosta

Population (2016)
  - Total: 821
- Time zone: UTC+3:30 (IRST)

Piruz (Persian: پيروز) (Note: Also romanized as Pīrūz; also known as Fārī and Parī (پري)) is a village in, and the capital of, Kamazan-e Vosta Rural District in Zand District of Malayer County, Hamadan province, Iran.

== History ==
During the Iranian revolution, on 13 May 1978, the Piruz incident took place near Piruz, when several students travelling by bus from Malayer were stopped at an army check point and shot. On several demonstrations in Hamadan province the punishment of the soldiers was demanded, but only one of the soldiers was sentenced.

== Demographics ==
=== Language ===
It is a Luri-speaking village.

=== Population ===
At the time of the 2006 National Census, the village's population was 1,157 in 310 households. The following census in 2011 counted 1,053 people in 334 households. The 2016 census measured the population of the village as 821 people in 276 households, the most populous in its rural district.

== Notable people ==
Karim Khan Zand, founder of the Zand dynasty and ruler of Iran from 1751 to 1779 was born here in c.1705.
