= Karim Khan Zand =

Vakil ol-Ra'aya of Iran from 1751 to 1779

Karim Khan Zand کریم خان زند
- Vakil ol-Ra'aya (Deputy of the People)
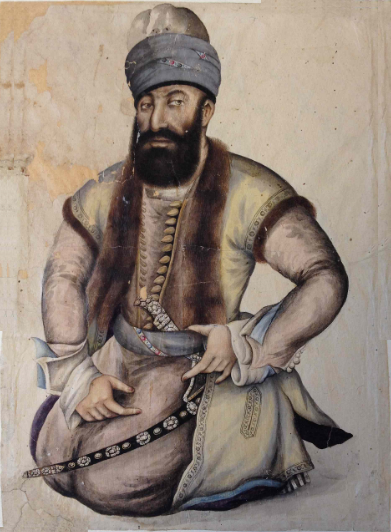
- Contemporary portrait of Karim Khan Zand

Vakil ol-Ra'aya of Iran
- Reign: 1751 – 1 March 1779
- Predecessor: Nader Shah (as Shah of Iran)
- Successor: Mohammad Ali Khan Zand
- Born: c. 1705; Pari, Safavid Iran
- Died: 1 March 1779 (aged about 74); Shiraz, Zand Iran
- Burial: Pars Museum (1779–1796, 1925–present); Golestan Palace (1796–1925)
- Consorts: Khadijeh Begum; Shakh-e Nabat
- Issue: Mohammad Rahim; Abol-Fath Khan Zand; Mohammad Ali Khan Zand; Anwar Shirazi; Saleh Khan
- Dynasty: Zand
- Father: Inaq Khan Zand
- Mother: Begum Agha Zanganeh
- Religion: Twelver Shia Islam
- Military career
- Conflicts: Zand campaigns in Western Iran; Siege of Isfahan (1750); Siege of Kermanshah; Battle of Qara Chaman; Qajar-Zand Wars; Siege of Astarabad; Siege of Shiraz; Battle of Astarabad; Persian–Afghan Wars; Battle of Kamarej Ottoman–Persian War (1776–1779)

Mohammad Karim Khan Zand (Persian: محمدکریم خان زند, romanized: Mohammad Karīm Khân-e Zand; c. 1705 – 1 March 1779) was the founder of the Zand dynasty, ruling all of Iran (Persia) except for Khorasan and Balochistan from 1751 to 1779. He also ruled over some of the Caucasian lands and occupied Basra for some years.

While Karim was ruler, Iran recovered from the devastation of 40 years of war, providing the war-ravaged country with a renewed sense of tranquillity, security, peace, and prosperity. The years from 1765 to Karim Khan's death in 1779, marked the zenith of Zand rule. During his reign, relations with Britain were restored, and the East India Company allowed to have a trading post in southern Iran. He made Shiraz his capital and ordered the construction of several architectural projects there.

Following Karim Khan's death, civil war broke out once more, and none of his descendants was able to rule the country as effectively as he had. The last of these descendants, Lotf Ali Khan, was executed by Qajar ruler Agha Mohammad Khan Qajar, who became the sole ruler of Iran.

== Background and early life ==
Karim Beg belonged to the Zand tribe, a small and little-known tribe of Laks, a branch of Lurs who may have been originally Kurdish. The Zands were concentrated on the villages of Pari and Kamazan in the Malayer district but were also found roaming in the central Zagros ranges and the countryside of Hamadan. Karim Beg was born in c. 1705 in the village of Pari, then part of the Safavid Empire. He was the eldest son of a certain Inaq Khan Zand, and had 3 sisters, a brother named Mohammad Sadeq Khan, and two half-brothers named Zaki Khan and Eskandar Khan Zand. In 1722, the Safavid Empire was on the verge of collapsing—Isfahan and most of central and east Iran had been seized by the Afghan Hotak dynasty, while the Russians had conquered many cities in northern Iran. Around the same time, the Ottoman Empire took advantage of Iran's decadence to conquer a large number of western frontier districts. There they faced bold opposition from the local clans, including the Zands, who under the chief Mehdi Khan Zand harassed their forces and stopped them from advancing further into Iran.

In 1732, Nader Qoli Beg, who had restored Safavid rule in Iran and had become the de facto ruler of the country, made an expedition into the Zagros ranges of western Iran in order to subdue the tribes, whom he considered bandits. He first defeated the Bakhtiari and the Feylis, whom he forced to mass-migrate in larger numbers into Khorasan. He then baited Mehdi Khan Zand and his forces out of their stronghold at Pari, killing the latter and 400 of his Zand kinsmen. The surviving members of the tribe were forced to mass-migrate under the leadership of Inaq Khan Zand and his younger brother Budaq Khan Zand to Abivard and Dargaz, where its able members, including Karim Beig were incorporated into Nader's army.

In 1736, Nader deposed the Safavid ruler Abbas III (r. 1732–1736) and ascended the throne, assuming the name of "Nader Shah", thus starting the Afsharid dynasty. Karim Beg, who was at this time in his thirties, served as a cavalryman and did not enjoy a high status in the army. Furthermore, he was also deprived of money, which made him commit theft—told by John R. Perry, in summary, as follows:

"He used later to tell how, as a poor cavalryman in Nader's employ, he once stole a gold-embossed saddle belonging to an Afghan officer from outside a saddler's shop, where it had been left for repair. The next day he heard that the saddler had been held responsible for the loss, and was to be executed. Conscience-smitten, Karim surreptitiously replaced the saddle at the shop door, and watched from concealment. The saddler's wife was the first to discover; she fell on her knees, calling down blessings on the unknown thief who had a change of heart, praying that he might live to own a hundred such saddles."

== Rise to power ==
=== Return to western Iran ===
Nader Shah was later murdered in 1747 at the hands of his own men, which gave the Zands under Karim Khan the opportunity to return to their former lands in western Iran. In 1748/49, Karim Khan allied with the military leader Zakariya Khan, and clashed with the Bakhtiari chieftain Ali Mardan Khan Bakhtiari, whom they initially defeated, but was shortly suffered a loss and was forced to withdraw from the strategic town of Golpayegan, which Ali Mardan seized.

In the spring of 1750, Ali Mardan attempted to capture the former Safavid capital of Isfahan, but was defeated at Murcheh Khvort, a town near the city. He then started to dispatch messengers at Golpayegan to his regional opponents, which included Karim Khan and Zakariya Khan, who accepted his offer of terms, and combined their forces with the latter, which made the number of their men strengthen to 20,000.

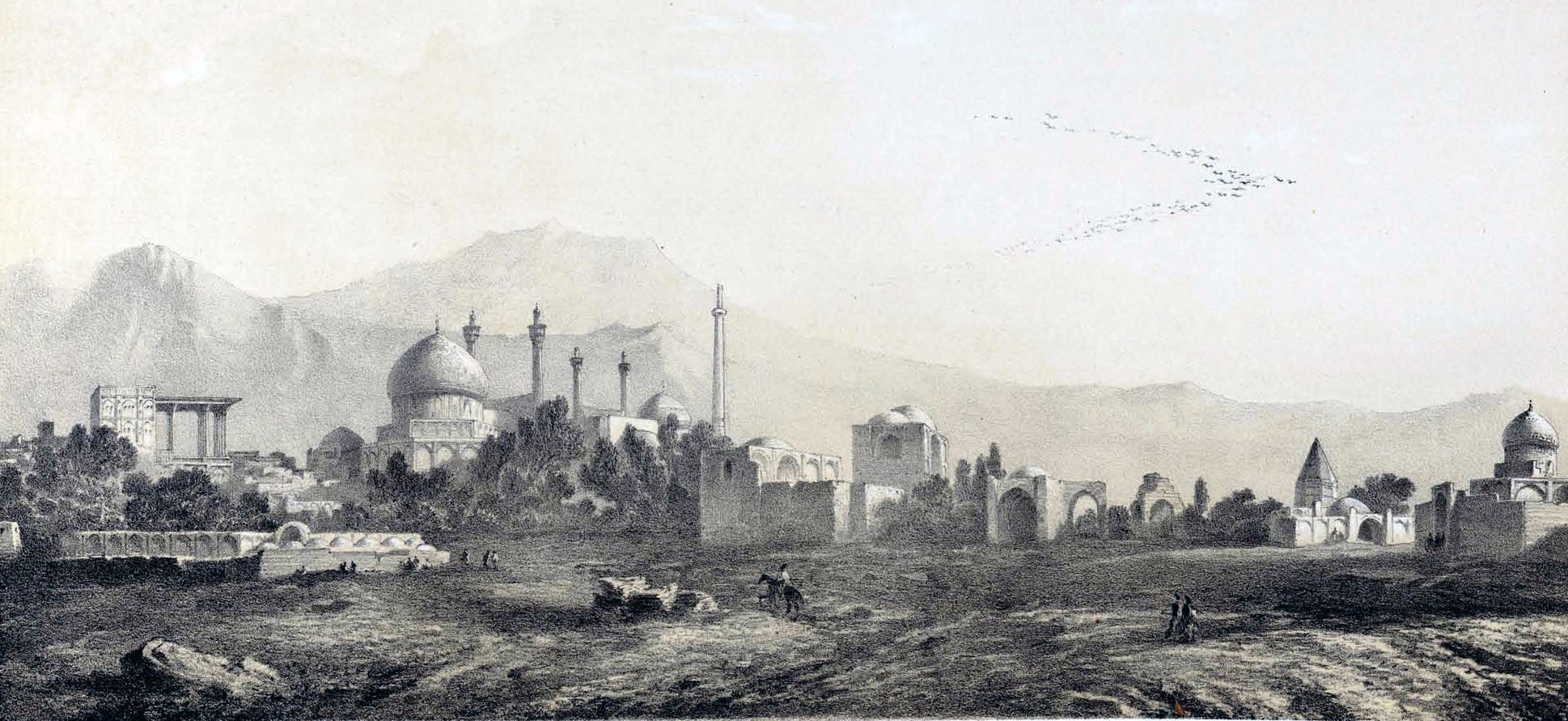
An illustration of Isfahan from the south.

In May 1750, they stormed the gates of Isfahan—its governor Abu'l-Fath Khan Bakhtiari and other prominent residents assembled to protect the fortress of the city, but agreed to surrender and collaborate with them after Ali Mardan's reasonable proposals. Abu'l-Fath, together with Ali Mardan and Karim Khan, formed an alliance in western Iran under the cover of restoring the Safavid dynasty, appointing a 17-year-old Safavid prince, Abu Turab, as a puppet ruler—on 29 June, Abu Turab was declared shah, and assumed the dynastic name of Ismail III.

Ali Mardan then took the title of Vakil-e daulat ("deputy of the state") as the head of the administration, while Abu'l-Fath maintained his post as governor of Isfahan, and Karim Khan was appointed commander (sardar) of the army, and was given the task of conquering the rest of Iran. However, a few months later, while Karim Khan was on an expedition in Kurdistan, Ali Mardan began breaking the terms which they had promised the inhabitants of Isfahan—he greatly increased his shakedown on the city, which New Julfa suffered the most from. He then further broke the terms he had made with the two chieftains, by having Abu'l-Fath deposed and killed. He then appointed his uncle as the new governor of the city, and without conference, marched towards Shiraz and began pillaging the province of Fars. After having plundered Kazerun, Ali Mardan left for Isfahan, but was ambushed at the dangerous passage of Kutal-e Dokhtar by regional guerrillas under Muzari Ali Khishti, who was the chieftain of the neighbouring Khisht village. They managed to seize the plunder of Ali Mardan and kill 300 of his men, which forced the latter to withdraw to a more difficult passage to reach Isfahan. By winter, the forces of Ali Mardan had decreased even more due to abandonment from some of his men.

=== War with Ali Mardan Khan Bakhtiari over supremacy in western Iran ===
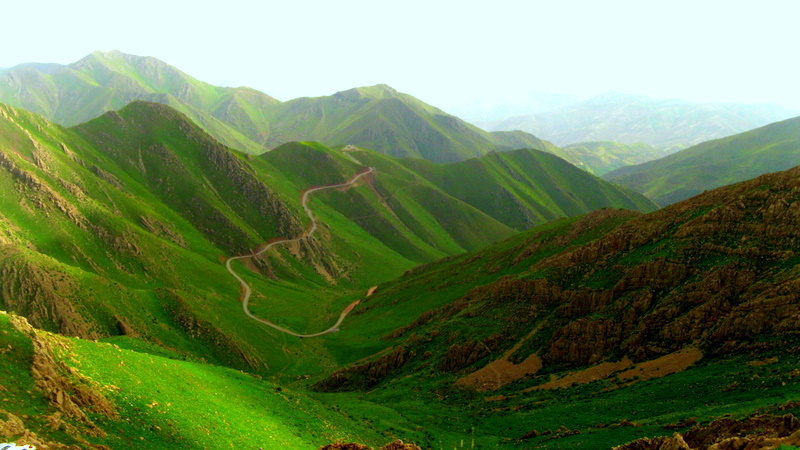
Landscape of western Iran.

The situation worsened further for Ali Mardan, when Karim Khan returned to Isfahan in January 1751 and restored order in the city. A battle shortly occurred between them in Chaharmahal—during the battle, Ismail III and Zakariya Khan (who was now his vizier), together with several prominent officers, deserted Ali Mardan and joined Karim Khan, who eventually emerged victorious, forcing Ali Mardan and the remains of his men, together with the governor of Luristan, Ismail Khan Feyli, to retreat to Khuzestan. There Ali Mardan made an alliance with Shaykh Sa'd, the governor of Khuzestan, who reinforced him with soldiers. In the late spring of 1752, Ali Mardan, together with Ismail Khan Feyli, marched to Kermanshah. The forces of Karim Khan shortly attacked their encampment, but were repelled. Ali Mardan then went further into domains of the Zands, which resulted in a battle with Karim Khan near Nahavand. Ali Mardan, however, was once again defeated, and forced to withdraw into the mountains, where he went to the Ottoman city of Baghdad.

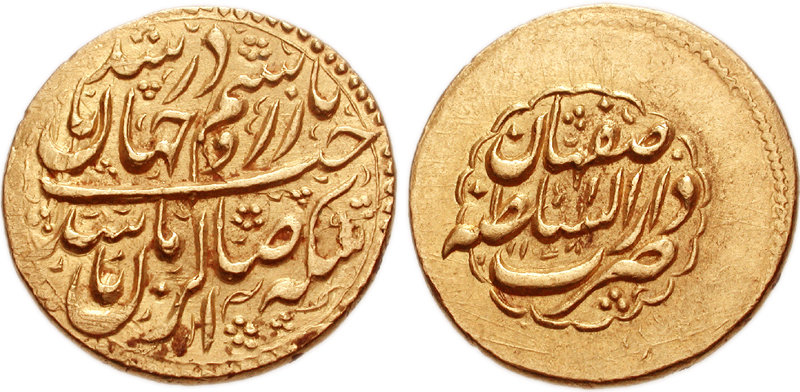
Gold coin of Karim Khan Zand, minted in Isfahan, dated 1755/6

A year later, in early 1753, Ali Mardan together with a former Afsharid diplomat and a son of the former Safavid shah Tahmasp II (r. 1729–1732) had returned to Iran and began assembling an army in Luristan, and received the support of the Pashtun military leader Azad Khan Afghan. Some months later, they marched into the domains of Karim Khan, but Tahmasp II's son, who had been announced as Sultan Husayn II, began revealing himself as an unfit candidate as Safavid shah—this hindered their march, and resulted in the desertion of many of their men.

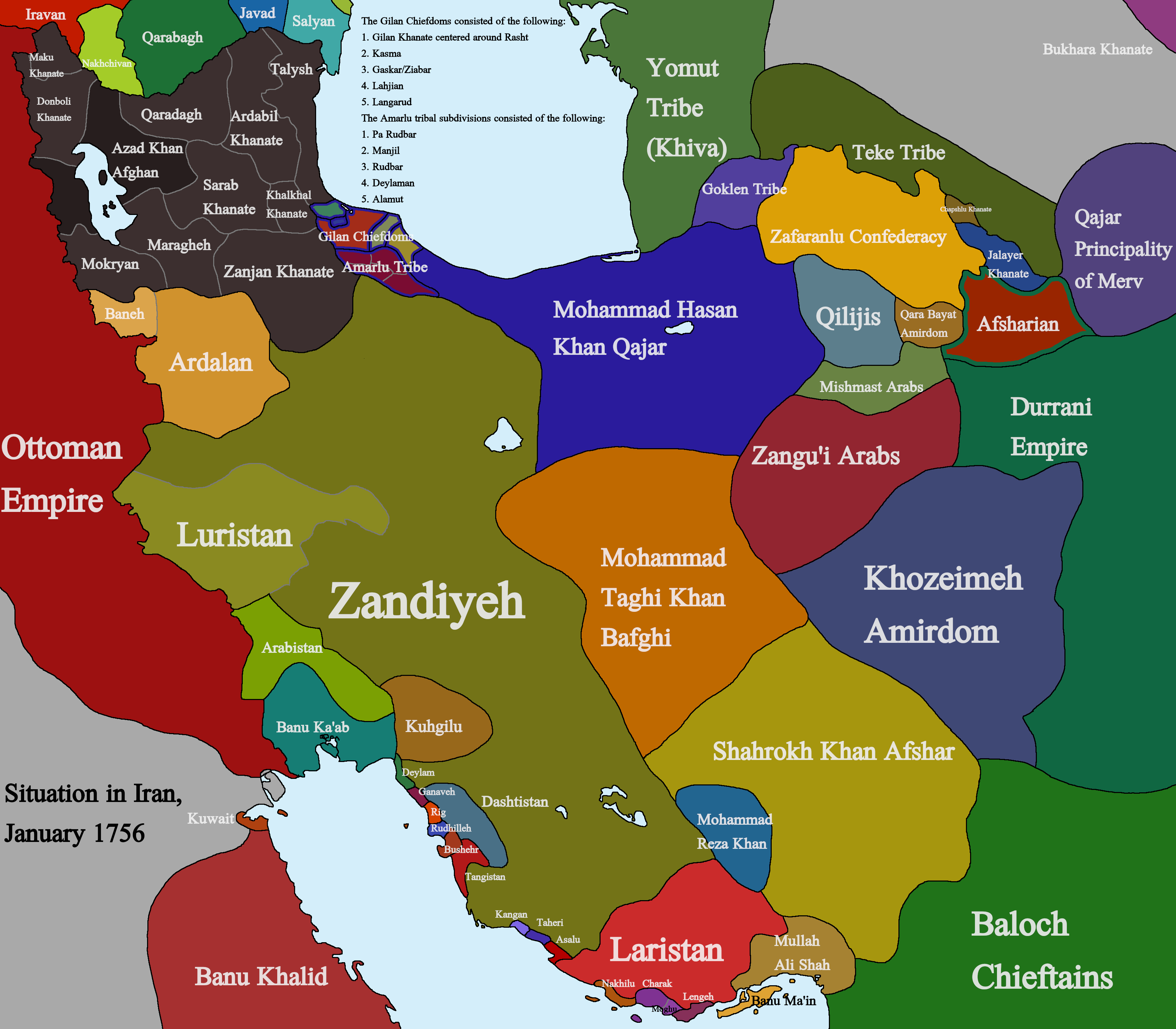
Situation in Iran around January 1756

Ali Mardan's men in Kirmanshah, after two years of besiegement by the Zand forces, surrendered and were spared by Karim Khan, who shortly clashed with Ali Mardan once again, defeating the latter and capturing Mustafa Khan. Ali Mardan managed to flee with Sultan Husayn II, but not after long had him blinded and sent to Iraq, due to being more heavy weight than of use to him.

== Reign ==
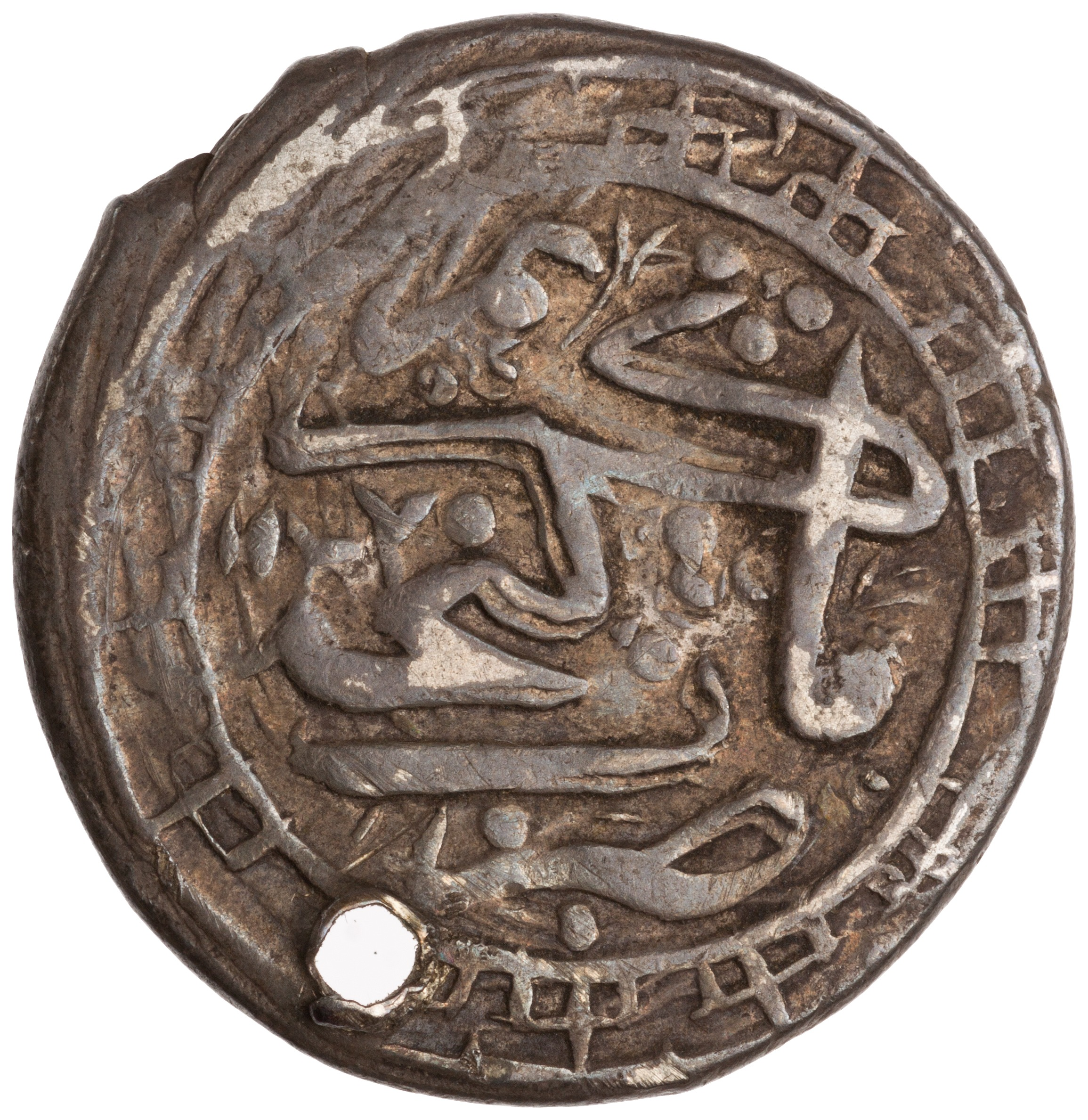
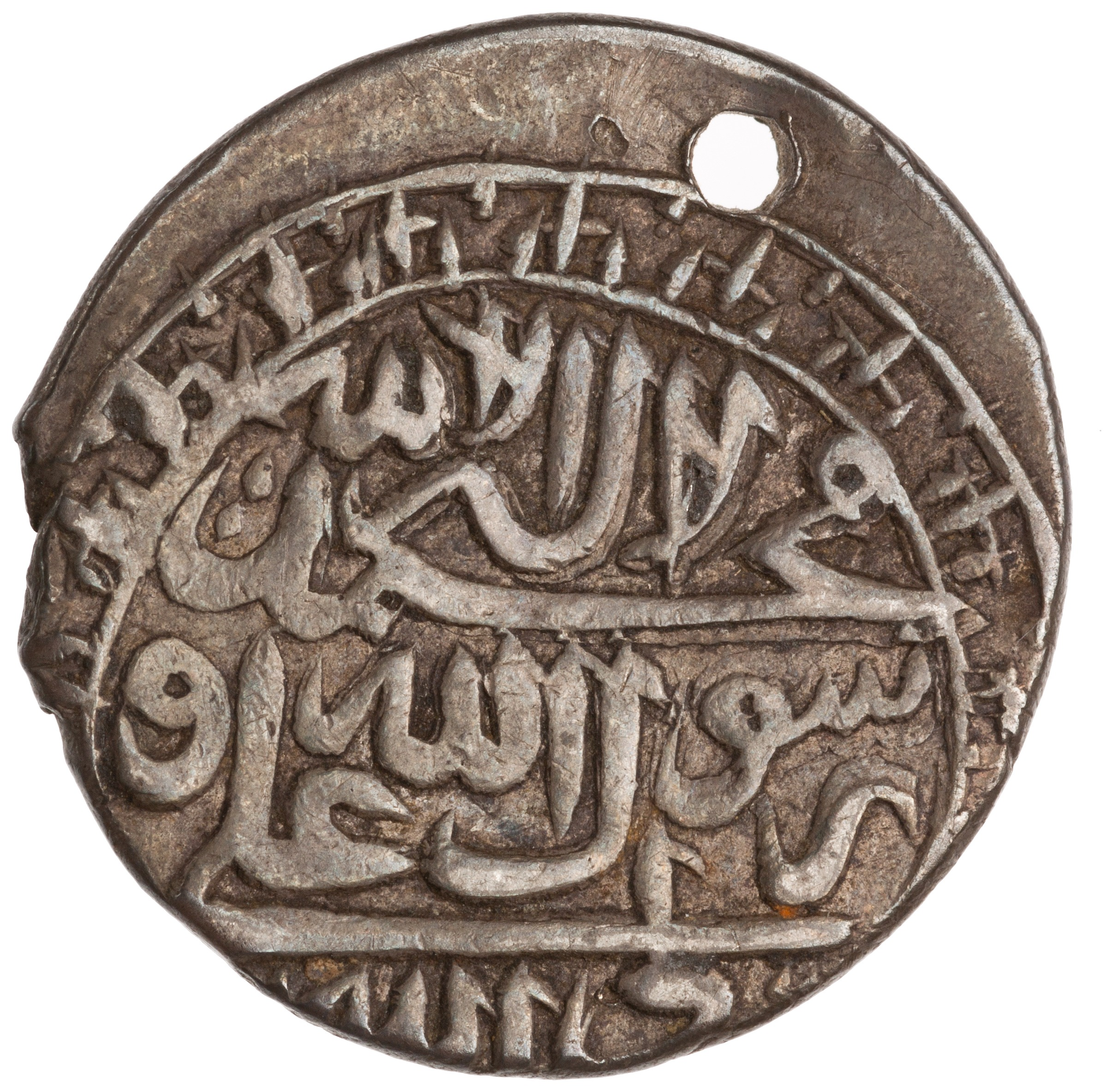
Silver coin of Karim Khan Zand, minted in Ganja, dated 1763/4 (left = obverse; right = reverse)

Some time later, Karim Khan, Ali Mardan Khan and another Bakhtiari chieftain named Abulfath Khan Bakhtiari reached an agreement to divide the country among themselves and give the throne to the Safavid prince Ismail III. However, the cooperation ended after Ali Mardan Khan invaded Isfahan and killed Abulfath Khan. Subsequently, Karim Khan killed Ali Mardan Khan and gained control over all of Iran except Khorasan, which was ruled by Shahrukh, the grandson of Nader Shah. Nevertheless, Karim Khan did not adopt the title of Shah for himself, preferring the title, Vakil al-ra'āyā (Representative of the People).

While Karim was ruler, Persia recovered from the devastation of 40 years of war, providing the war ravaged country with a renewed sense of tranquility, security, peace, and prosperity. The years from 1765 to Karim Khan's death in 1779 marked the zenith of Zand rule. During his reign, relations with Britain were restored, and he allowed the East India Company to have a trading post in southern Iran. He made Shiraz his capital and ordered the construction of several architectural projects there. Karim Khan later died on 1 March 1779, having been ill for six months, most likely due to tuberculosis. He was buried three days later in the "Nazar Garden", now known as the Pars Museum.

Following Karim Khan's death, civil war broke out once more, and none of his descendants were able to rule the country as effectively as he had. The last of these descendants, Lotf Ali Khan, was killed by Qajar ruler Agha Mohammad Khan, who became the sole ruler of Iran.

=== War with the Dutch East India Company ===
The Zands and the Dutch often clashed for influence of the Kharg Island.

=== War with the Ottoman Empire (1775–1776) ===
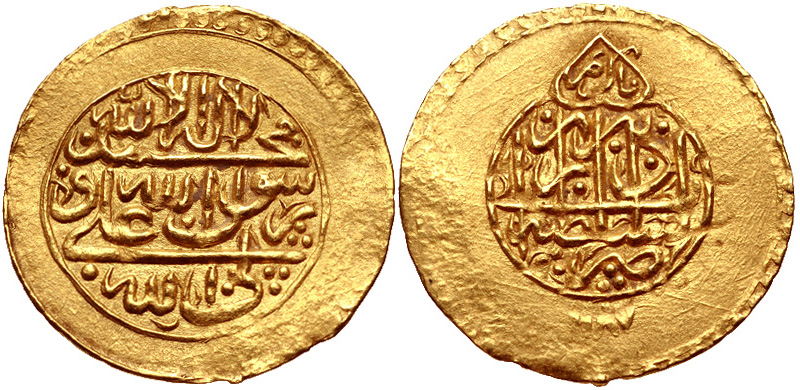
Gold coin of Karim Khan Zand, minted in Tabriz, dated 1773/4

In 1774, the Mamluk governor of the Ottoman province of Iraq, Omar Pasha began meddling in the affairs of his vassal principality of Baban, which since the death of his predecessor Sulayman Abu Layla Pasha in 1762, had fallen more and more under the influence of the Zand governor of Ardalan, Khosrow Khan Bozorg. This made Omar Pasha dismiss the Baban ruler Muhammad Pasha, and appoint Abdolla Pasha as its new ruler. This, and Omar Pasha's seizure of the remnants of Iranian pilgrims who had died during the plague that ravaged Iraq in 1773—and his exaction of payment from Iranian pilgrims to visit the holy Shia places of Najaf and Karbala, gave Karim Khan the casus belli to declare war against the Ottomans.

There were also other reasons for Karim Khan to declare war—Mashhad, where the holy Imam Reza shrine was situated, was not under Zand control, which thus meant that free entry to the sanctuaries of Iraq was of more significance to Karim Khan than it had been to the Safavid and Afsharid shahs. The Zand army was discontent, and sought to restore their reputation after Zaki Khans humiliating blunders on the Hormuz Island. Most importantly, Basra was a prominent trading port, which had surpassed the competing city of Bushehr in Fars in 1769, when the East India Company dropped the city for Basra.

The Zand forces under Ali-Morad Khan Zand and Nazar Ali Khan Zand shortly clashed with the Pasha's forces in Kurdistan, where they kept them at bay, whilst Sadeq Khan, with an army of 30,000, besieged Basra in April 1775. The Arab tribe al-Muntafiq, which was allied with the governor of Basra, quickly withdrew without any effort to reject Sadeq Khan from passing through the Shatt al-Arab, whilst the Banu Ka'b and the Arabs of Bushehr supplied him with boats and supplies.

Suleiman Agha, who was the commander of the fort of Basra, resisted Sadeq Khan's forces with resolve, which made the latter establish an encirclement, which would last over a year. Henry Moore, who belonged to the East India company, assaulted some of Sadeq Khan's stockpile boats, tried to block the Shatt al-Arab, and then departed to Bombay. A few months later, in October, a group of ships from Oman gave supplies and military aid to Basra, which considerably lifted the morale of its forces. However, their combined attack the next day occurred to be wavering—the Omani ships eventually chose to withdraw back to Muscat during winter, in order to avoid further losses.

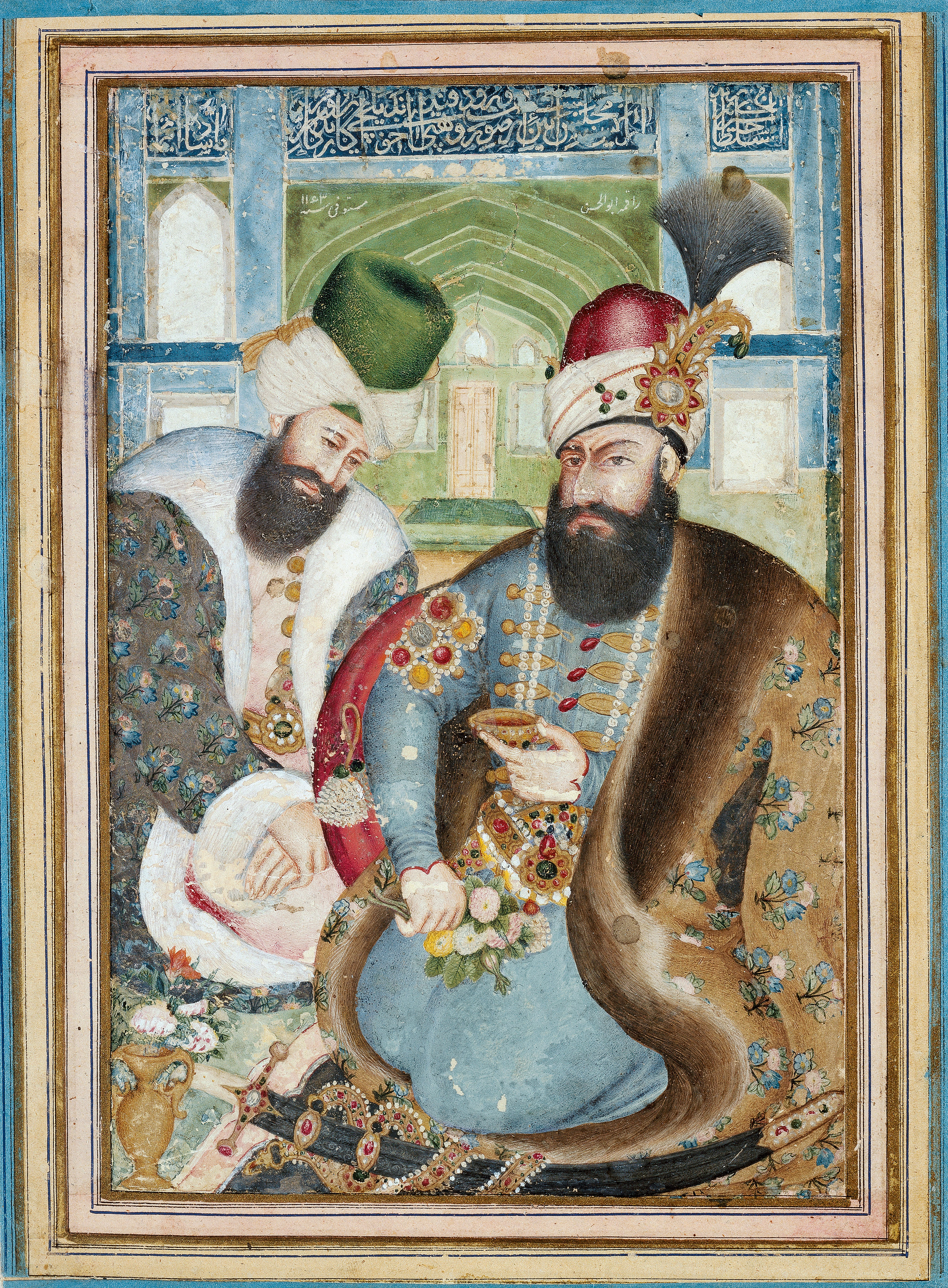
Karim Khan Zand with the Ottoman envoy Vehbi Efendi.

Reinforcements from Baghdad arrived shortly afterwards, which was repelled by the Khaza'il, a Shia Arab tribe which was allied with the Zand forces. In the spring of 1776, the narrow encirclement by Sadeq Khan had resulted in the defenders being on the fringe of famine—a considerable portion of the Basra forces had deserted Suleiman Agha, whilst the rumours of a possible uprising, made Suleiman Agha surrender on 16 April 1776.

Even though the able Ottoman Sultan Mustafa III (r. 1757–1774) had died and was succeeded by his incompetent brother Abdul Hamid I (r. 1774–1789), and the recent Ottoman defeat to the Russians, the Ottoman response to the Ottoman–Iranian war was unusually slow. In February 1775, before the announcement of the siege of Basra had approached Constantinople, and while the Zagros front was temporarily peaceful, the Ottoman ambassador, Vehbi Efendi, was sent to Shiraz. He reached Shiraz around the same time Sadeq Khan besieged Basra, "but was not empowered to negotiate over this new crisis."

In 1778, Karim Khan had made a compromise with the Russians for a cooperative offensive into eastern Anatolia. However, the invasion never took place due to Karim Khan's death on 1 March 1779, after having been ill for six months, most likely due to tuberculosis. He was buried three days later in the "Nazar Garden", now known as the Pars Museum.

== Succession ==
Following Karim Khan's death, civil war broke out—Zaki Khan, in an alliance with Ali-Morad Khan Zand, declared Karim Khan's incapable and youngest son Mohammad Ali Khan Zand as the new Zand ruler, while Shaykh Ali Khan and Nazar Ali Khan, along with other notables, supported Karim Khan's elder son, Abol-Fath Khan Zand. However, shortly afterwards, Zaki Khan baited Shaykh Ali Khan and Nazar Ali Khan out of the fortress of Shiraz, and slaughtered them.

== Relations with Agha Mohammad Khan Qajar ==
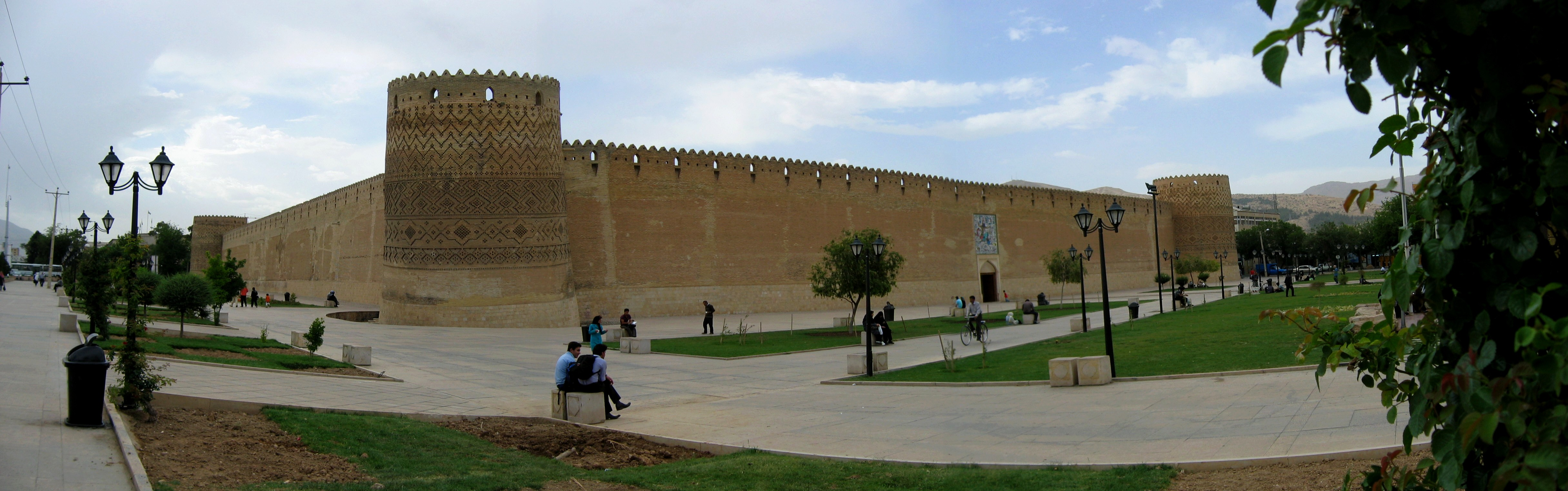
Picture of the Arg of Karim Khan, the royal residence of the Zand dynasty, where Agha Mohammad Khan spent most of his time during his "captivity".

During his stay Agha Mohammad Khan was treated kindly and honorably by Karim Khan, who made him convince his kinsmen to lay down their arms, which they did. Karim Khan then settled them in Damghan. In 1763, Agha Mohammad Khan and Hosayn Qoli Khan were sent to the Zand capital, Shiraz, where their paternal aunt Khadijeh Begum, who was part of Karim Khan's harem, lived. Agha Mohammad Khan's half-brothers Morteza Qoli Khan and Mostafa Qoli Khan were granted permission to live in Astarabad, due to their mother being the sister of the governor of the city. His remaining brothers were sent to Qazvin, where they were treated honorably.

Agha Mohammad was looked upon more as a respected guest in Karim Khan's court than a captive. Furthermore, Karim Khan also acknowledged Agha Mohammad Khan's political knowledge and asked his advice on interests of the state. He called Agha Mohammad Khan his "Piran-e Viseh", referring to an intelligent counselor of the legendary Iranian king Afrasiab. Two of Agha Mohammad Khan's brothers who were at Qazvin were also sent to Shiraz during this period. In February 1769, Karim Khan appointed Hosayn Qoli Khan as the governor of Damghan. When Hosayn Qoli Khan reached Damghan, he immediately began a fierce conflict with the Develu and other tribes to avenge his father's death. He was, however, killed ca. 1777 near Findarisk by some Turks from the Yamut tribe with whom he had clashed. On 1 March 1779, while Agha Mohammad Khan was hunting, he was informed by Khadijeh Begum that Karim Khan had died after six months of illness.

== Characteristics and legacy ==
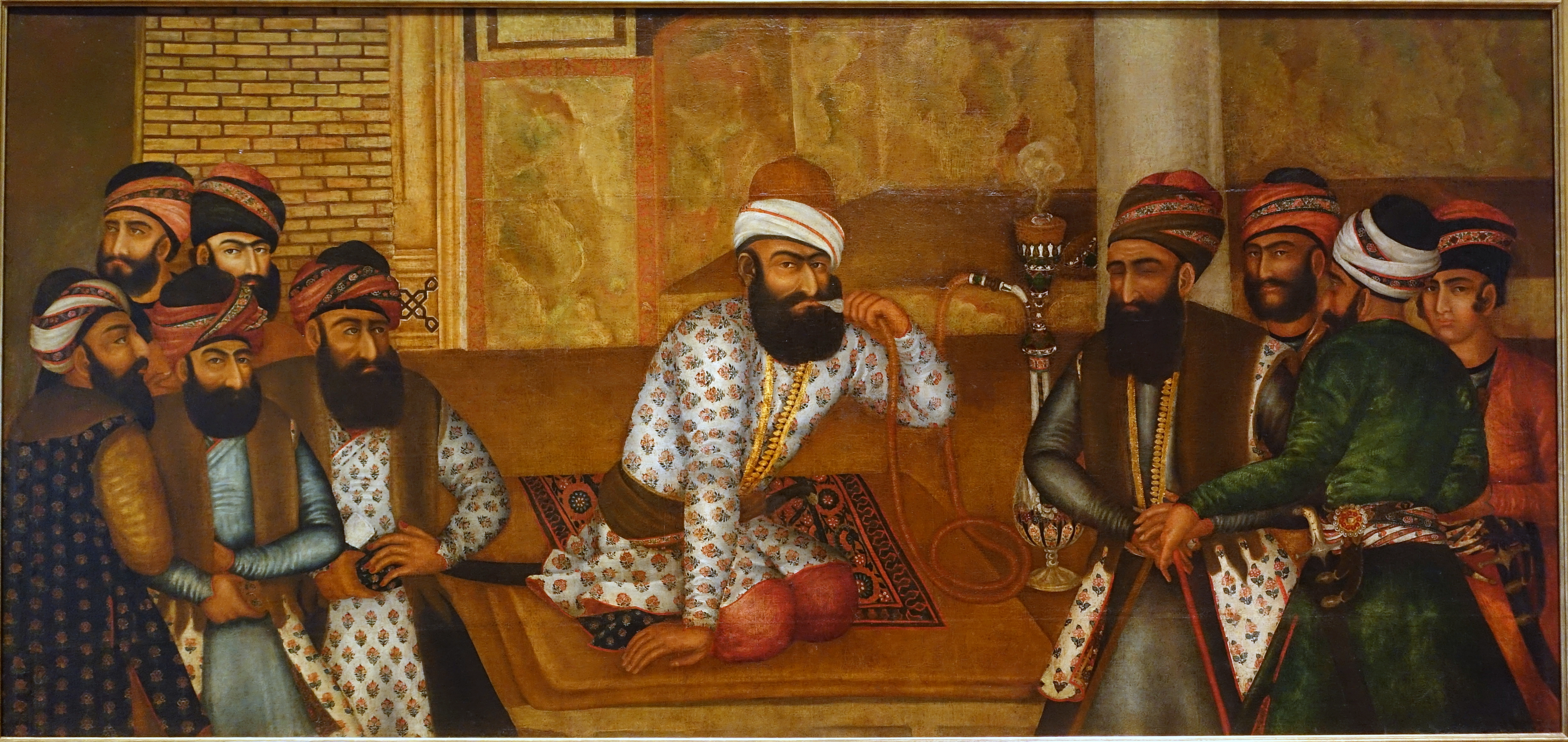
Karim Khan Zand amidst his close circle, sometimes attributed to Mohammad Sadeq, probably 19th century, oil on canvas.

Karim Khan is often praised for his generosity, modesty and fairness more than other Iranian rulers—he surpasses Khosrow I Anushirvan and Shah Abbas I the Great in terms of being a benevolent monarch with a sincere interest in his subjects, whereas these and other monarchs outperform him in terms of military fame and global reputation. A wealth of tales and anecdotes portray Karim Khan as a compassionate ruler, genuinely concerned with the welfare of his subjects.

In present-day Iran he is remembered by his compatriots as a respectable man who rose to become a ruler and continued his virtuous behaviour. He was not embarrassed of his modest descent, and never desired to attempt to pursue a more distinguished lineage than that of the leader of a formerly little-known tribe that roamed in the Zagros ranges of western Iran. Karim Khan had modest preferences in clothes and furniture, having the tall yellow cashmere Zand turban on the top of his head, whilst sitting on an inexpensive carpet rather than a throne. He had presents of jewels crushed into pieces and sold to keep the state treasury stable. He washed himself and changed clothes once a month, a wastefulness which even astonished his kinsmen.

During his reign, Karim Khan achieved in reviving an unexpected rate of considerable good fortune and harmony to a country that had suffered from impair and turmoil by his predecessors. Although his integrity is considerably enlarged due to the cruelty and authoritarianism of Nader Shah and Agha Mohammad Khan Qajar, his unusual mixture of vitality and ambition with rationality and goodwill created, for a short extent of time in a notably fierce and anarchic century, a balanced and virtuous state.

As noted by The Oxford Dictionary of Islam, "Karim Khan Zand holds an enduring reputation as the most humane Iranian ruler of the Islamic era". Following the Islamic Revolution of 1979, the names of the past rulers of Iran became taboo, but the citizens of Shiraz refused to rename the two main streets of Shiraz, one of which being the Karim Khan Zand Street (the other one being the Lotf Ali Khan Zand Street).

In the words of John Malcolm, "The happy reign of this excellent prince, as contrasted with those who preceded and followed him, affords the historian of Persia that kind of mixed pleasure and repose, which a traveler enjoys on arriving in a beautiful and fertile valley during an arduous journey over barren and rugged wastes. It is pleasing to recount the actions of a chief who, though born of an inferior rank, obtained power without crime, and who exercised it with a moderation that, for the times in which he lived, was as singular as his humanity and justice."

In "Iran: A Modern History": "His rule of more than two decades marks one of the most tranquil in Iran’s early modern history, a remarkable example of how the ruler’s personal qualities, rather than the institutional framework within which he operated, determined political stability, the well-being of subjects, and cultural florescence."

== Government, policies, and society ==
=== The bureaucracy ===
The bureaucracy remained small during the reign of Karim Khan, due slightly to the ruler's own desires and slightly to the earlier clutters and subsequent bureaucratic collapse that had occurred. He was backed by a vizier and a chief revenue officer (mustaufī), who, however, had minimal influence and authority, due to Karim Khan's practice of rigidly handling the political affairs by himself.

=== Provincial administration ===
Flag of Iran during the reign of Karim Khan.

During Karim Khan's reign, provincial administration followed the same model of the Safavid one; beglerbegis were appointed to govern provinces. A city was under the rule of a kalantar and darugha, while its quarters was under the rule of the kadkhuda. Governorship of provinces went for the most part to tribal chieftains from Fars and its surroundings—a minister who was experienced in the administration and the income of tax regularly escorted the governor. Karim Khan also created two new posts regarding the tribes: He appointed an ilkhani as the leader of all the Lur tribes and an ilbegi as the leader of all the Qashqai tribes that roamed Fars.

=== Military ===
During the dynastic wars and the conflict with the Qajars that took place after the death of Karim Khan, the Zand army disintegrated into several segments, which joined the several Zand princes who fought for the throne, but ultimately the majority of the segments changed their allegiance to the Qajar ruler Agha Mohammad Khan Qajar.

Karim Khan's standing army of Fars during the period 1765–1775	No. of personnel
Lur, Kurd, Lak (Feylis, Zand, Zanganeh, Kalhor, etc.; cavalry)	24 000
Bakhtiari (cavalry and tofangchi infantry)	3 000
Iraqi, i.e. from Persian Iraq (Persian tofangchi infantry)	12 000
Fars (including Khuzestan and Dashtestan: Persian tofangchi infantry, Arab and Iranian cavalry)	6 000
Total	45 000

=== Construction ===
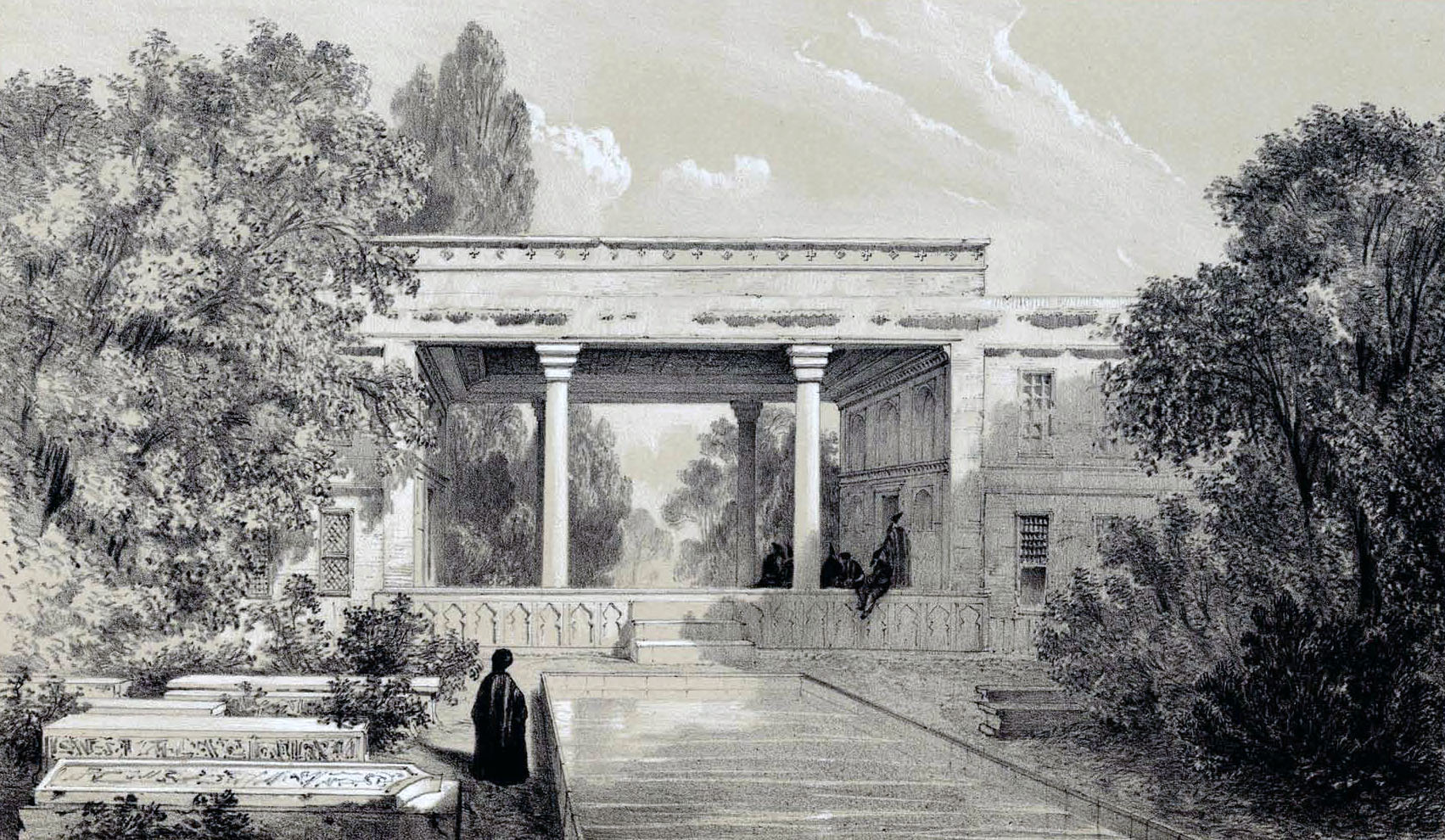
Mid 19th-century illustration of the Tomb of Hafez.

Karim Khan rebuilt much of Shiraz, and had many new buildings erected, such as his famous castle, and several gardens and mosques. Furthermore, he also had a new city wall, several baths, a caravanserai, and a bazaar built. Many of these, have, however, been destroyed, either during Agha Mohammad Khan Qajar's capture of the city in 1792, or during the 20th-century metropolitan restructuring.

Karim Khan had the burial places of the prominent Muzaffarid ruler Shah Shoja (r. 1358–1384), and the celebrated Persian poets Hafez and Saadi renovated. Many of the pastoral Lur and Lak families were given homes in Shiraz, which eventually resulted in the city having a larger population (ca. 40,000-50,000) than Isfahan, which drew the attention of many poets, craftsmens, and even foreign traders from Europe and India, who were warmly received.

=== Religious policies ===
Unlike the Safavids, Karim Khan did not seek the approval of the ulama (clergy), who were "formerly the bulwarks of the shah's authority as viceroy of God and the Imams".

== In art ==
Karim Khan is the main character of a melodrama composed by the Italian musician Nicolò Gabrielli di Quercita. The work, entitled L'assedio di Sciraz (The siege of Shiraz) was first performed at La Scala theatre in Milan during Carnival 1840.

== Sources ==
- Fisher, William Bayne; Avery, P.; Hambly, G. R. G; Melville, C. (1991). The Cambridge History of Iran. Vol. 7. Cambridge: Cambridge University Press. ISBN 0521200954.
- Perry, John R. (2011). "Karim Khan Zand". Encyclopaedia Iranica, Vol. XV, Fasc. 6. pp. 561–564.
- Perry, John R. (2010). "Zand dynasty". Encyclopaedia Iranica, Vol. XV, Fasc. 6.
- Perry, John R. (2012). Karim Khan Zand: a history of Iran, 1747–1779. Simon and Schuster. ISBN 978-1-78074-199-4.
- Malcolm, John, Sir, The history of Persia, from the most early period to the present time containing an account of the religion, government, usages, and character of the inhabitants of that kingdom in 2 volumes; London : Murray, 1815.; re-published by Adamant Media Corporation 2004 vol 1. ISBN 978-1-4021-5134-7; vol. 2 ISBN 978-1-4021-5205-4.
- Perry, J. R. (1984). "ĀḠĀ MOḤAMMAD KHAN QĀJĀR". Encyclopaedia Iranica. Vol. I, Fasc. 6. pp. 602–605.
- Hambly, Gavin R.G (1991). "Agha Muhammad Khan and the establishment of the Qajar dynasty". The Cambridge History of Iran, Vol. 7: From Nadir Shah to the Islamic Republic. Cambridge: Cambridge University Press. pp. 104–144. ISBN 9780521200950.
- Perry, John (1991). "The Zand dynasty". The Cambridge History of Iran, Vol. 7: From Nadir Shah to the Islamic Republic. Cambridge: Cambridge University Press. pp. 63–104. ISBN 9780521200950.
- Nicolas J. Preud’homme, « A French Manuscript on Trade and Diplomacy in Iran during the Zand Era », Journal of Persianate Studies 15.2 (2022), 215 – 256.
- Bakhash, S. (1983). "ADMINISTRATION in Iran vi. Safavid, Zand, and Qajar periods". Encyclopaedia Iranica, Vol. I, Fasc. 5. pp. 462–466.
- Garthwaite, Gene R. (2005). The Persians. Wiley. pp. 1–311. ISBN 9781557868602.
- Shaw, Stanford (1991). "Iranian relations with the Ottoman Empire in the eighteenth and nineteenth centuries". The Cambridge History of Iran, Vol. 7: From Nadir Shah to the Islamic Republic. Cambridge: Cambridge University Press. pp. 297–314. ISBN 9780521200950.
- Farrokh, Kaveh (2011). Iran at War: 1500-1988. Bloomsbury Publishing. p. 145. ISBN 9781780962405.

Karim Khan Zand Zand dynasty Born: 1705 Died: 1779
Iranian royalty
New title	Vakil ol-Ra'aya of Iran; 1751–1779	Succeeded by Mohammad Ali Khan Zand
