= Ali-Morad Khan Zand =

Ruler of the Zand dynasty (1781–1785)

Ali-Morad Khan Zand علیمراد خان زند
- Khan
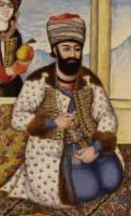
- Portrait of Ali-Morad Khan Zand

Ruler of the Zand dynasty
- Reign: 15 March 1781 – 11 February 1785
- Predecessor: Sadeq Khan Zand
- Successor: Jafar Khan
- Born: c. 1740; Malayer, Afsharid Iran
- Died: 11 February 1785; Murchakhur, Zand Iran
- Dynasty: Zand
- Father: Qaytas Khan
- Religion: Shia Islam

Ali-Morad Khan Zand (Persian: علیمرادخان زند; c. 1740 – 11 February 1785) was the fifth ruler of the Zand dynasty of Iran, ruling from 15 March 1781 until his death on 11 February 1785.

== Life ==
Ali-Morad Khan Zand was born in c. 1740, when Iran was ruled by the Afsharid dynasty. He was the son of Qaytas Khan, a member of the Hazara clan of the Zand tribe. The Zands were a rural tribe of Laks, a branch of Lurs, who may have been originally Kurdish. Their summer pastures were on the Zagros hills north of Kermanshah, while their winter grounds were on the Hamadan plains close to Malayer.

After the death of the first Zand ruler Karim Khan Zand, Agha Mohammad Khan Qajar who was a hostage—in light of preventing an outbreak of war between the Qajar tribes in the northern Iran and the Zands—escaped promptly and reached Mazandaran. Subsequently, he took command of his tribe in Astarabad, and declared independence from the Zand Shah. Therefore, Zaki Khan Zand dispatched the Zand army under the command of his nephew, Ali-Morad Khan against the Qajar lord.

Ali-Morad was given power over the Zand army to destroy rebellious Qajar tribes in the north, but he betrayed Abol-Fath Khan Zand, and left him defenseless in capital to be slain by Sadeq Khan Zand. Ali-Morad then captured Isfahan. He levied high taxes on the people and tortured and killed whoever refused. Finally, on 14 March 1781, he captured Shiraz, and killed Sadeq Khan, and sat on the throne. Ali-Morad continued the war with Agha Mohammad Khan and raised an army allowing his cousin Rostam to command it. Rostam took this army to the province of Mazandaran where he fought against a Qajar army under the command of Ja'far Qoli Khan. However, Rostam quickly lost the battle and was forced to retreat back to the south.

On 11 February 1785, Ali-Morad Khan died in Murchakhur.

== Personality ==
Ali-Morad had only one working eye and was said to be an alcoholic. However, he was considered a capable general, being the last Zand ruler to extend his rule north of Isfahan. Like the rest of Karim Khan's successors, he did not assume the latters title of vakil (deputy), nor that of the title of shah (king). Ali-Morad Khan was a patron of Abu'l-Hasan Mostawfi Ghaffari, who dedicated his historical chronicle Golshan-e Morad to him.

== Diplomacy ==
Before his death, Ali-Morad was in negotiations with the Russian Empire, willing to give them the Iranian-claimed regions north of the Aras River in exchange for acknowledgment and help so that he could stop the Qajars. Unaware of what he was doing, Ali-Morad was paving the way for foreign involvement in the succession issues, something that would grow over time and cause a lot of issues. However, he never made any significant promises, as he eventually got second thoughts about joining forces with Russia.

== Religious policy ==
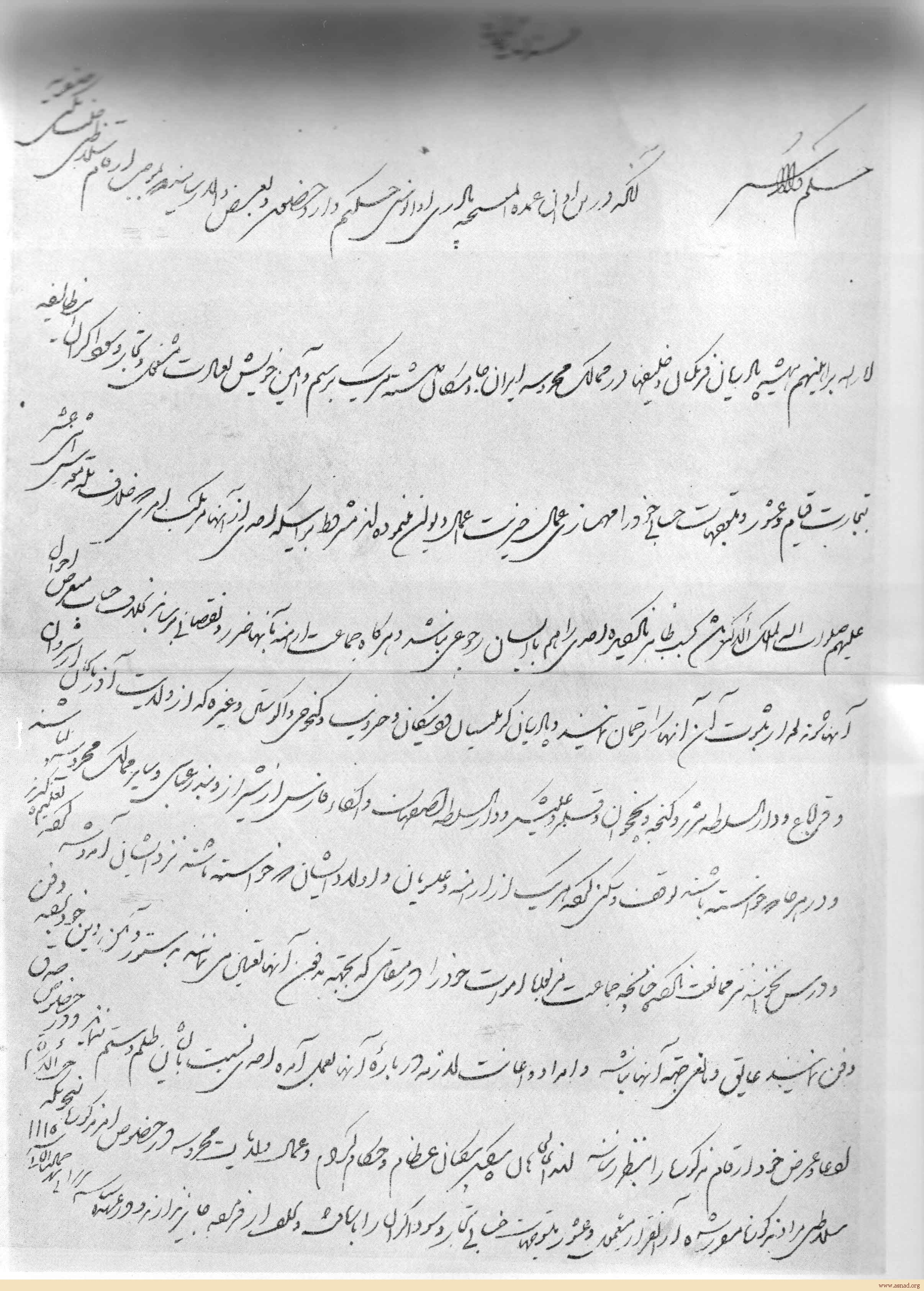
Page of the farman (royal edict) by Ali-Morad Khan Zand

In 1781 (between 25 May and 22 June) Ali-Morad issued a farman (royal edict) in Persian that granted the Christians of Iran freedom of religion as long as they remained loyal to the Zand dynasty. It was made due to a request by a priest named Avanus, which is typically a transliteration of the Armenian name of Hovhannes/Yohvannes. The identity of this individual is unclear, however it is conceivable that it could be the same person as Giovanni d'Arutiun, an Armenian Catholic missionary who operated in New Julfa in Isfahan at minimum from 1773 to 1788. The farman states that the Carmelites, Dominicans, Jesuits, Capuchins, and Augustinians could reside wherever in Iran, including Azerbaijan, Bandar Abbas, Isfahan, Karabakh, Nakhichevan, Shiraz and Shirvan, and could both educate and coexist with the Armenian population. The edict further instructs the beglarbegs (governors) to make it easier for the Christian priests to travel and live freely and to ensure that their business operations are not interfered with.

It is possible that Ali-Morad wanted to maintain Karim Khan's policies concerning the way Christian communities were treated to some extent. He also supported the return of European missionaries to Isfahan, as well as the rebuilding of the Armenian merchant community that had been devastated by famine in the 1750s. In comparison to other documents of its kind, the language of this edict is somewhat straightforward, and makes less use of the established rhetoric. The document has been published twice, by Jahangir Qa'em-Maqami and by Iraj Afshar.

== Sources ==
- Hambly, Gavin R. G. (1991). "Āghā Muhammad Khān and the establishment of the Qājār dynasty". In Avery, Peter; Hambly, Gavin R. G.; Melville, Charles Peter (eds.). The Cambridge History of Iran: From Nadir Shah to the Islamic Republic. Vol. 7. Cambridge: Cambridge University Press. pp. 104–143. ISBN 0-521-20095-4.
- Lang, David M. (1957). The last years of the Georgian Monarchy: 1658–1832. Columbia University Press. ISBN 978-0-231-93710-8.
- Matthee, Rudi (2008). "Safavid dynasty". Encyclopaedia Iranica.
- Perry, John R. (1979). Karim Khan Zand: A History of Iran, 1747–1779. University of Chicago Press. ISBN 978-0226660981.
- Perry, J. R. (1985). "ʿAlī-Morād Khan Zand". In Yarshater, Ehsan (ed.). Encyclopædia Iranica. Vol. I/8: Alafrank–Alp Arslan. London and New York: Routledge & Kegan Paul. pp. 445–465. ISBN 978-0-71009-097-3.
- Perry, John (2000). "Zand dynasty". Encyclopaedia Iranica. Routledge & Kegan Paul.
- Tapper, Richard (1997). Frontier Nomads of Iran: A Political and Social History of the Shahsevan. Cambridge University Press. ISBN 978-0-52158-336-7.
- Tiburcio, lberto (2018a). "ʿAlī-Murād Khān Zand". Christian-Muslim Relations. A Bibliographical History. Volume 12 Asia, Africa and the Americas (1700–1800). Brill.
- Tiburcio, lberto (2018b). "Farmān-i ʿAli-Murād Khān". Christian-Muslim Relations. A Bibliographical History. Volume 12 Asia, Africa and the Americas (1700–1800). Brill.
- Tucker, Ernest (2012). "ʿAlī Murād Khān Zand". In Fleet, Kate; Krämer, Gudrun; Matringe, Denis; Nawas, John; Rowson, Everett (eds.). Encyclopaedia of Islam (3rd ed.). Brill Online. ISSN 1873-9830.

Ali-Morad Khan Zand Zand dynasty Born: 1740 Died: 11 February 1785
Iranian royalty
Preceded by Sadiq Khan Zand	Ruler of the Zand dynasty 1781–1785	Succeeded by Jafar Khan Zand
