= Zand (tribe) =

Kurdish tribe in Iraq and Iran

The Zand tribe (Laki: ئیل زند) is a Laki-speaking Kurdish tribe mainly populating the countryside of Khanaqin in Iraq and in the provinces of Kurdistan and Hamadan in Iran.

== Origins ==
According to John R. Perry, some Zand communities spoke Kurdish while others spoke Luri, and the Zand tribe was variously considered Kurdish or Lur, and that "the reason for this confusion is evidently the position of the Zand home, at the eastern limit of the line through Kermanshah that traditionally divides Luristan from Kurdistan and where in practice Kurdish and Luri customs and dialects are intermingled. The narrative sources clearly imply, however, that the Zands regarded themselves, or at least were regarded, as quite distinct from their neighbors the Fayli Lurs on the one hand and the Kurds of Ardalan on the other. The Lak tribes, whose dialect shows characteristics of Kurdish rather than Luri, were apparently immigrants into this northernmost zone of Luristan, or were settled there by Shah 'Abbas. In the later Safavid Period, the Zands are mentioned together with the Laks as Lurs." The Cambridge History of Iran described the Zand tribe as a "minor pastoral people wintering on the Hamadan plains, centred on the villages of Pari and Kamazan in the vicinity of Malayir, they have been variously classified as Lurs and as Kurds: both Luri and Kurdish-speaking groups bearing the name of Zand have been noted in recent times, but the bulk of the evidence points to their being one of the northern Lur or Lak tribes, who may originally have been immigrants of Kurdish origin. They are, in any case, distinct from the Faili Lurs of Khurramabad." According to Kaveh Farrokh, "the ethnicity of the Zands has been variously ascribed to both Lurs and Kurds as the name Zand has appeared in both of the west Iranic peoples. In general, they are agreed to be Lak, or northern Lurs, most likely of Kurdish origin, distinct from Khorramabad's Faili Lurs."

Richard Foltz described the Zands as being of Lur or possibly Kurdish origin. Michael Axworthy wrote that the "small Zand tribe" were "originally from Lorestan (though perhaps ultimately of Kurdish origin)". Parviz Kambin described the Zand as "a Kurdish tribe that resided in northern Luristan Province." Saïd Amir Arjomand referred to them as the "Zand clan of the Lor tribal confederation". Ainslie Embree described the Zand tribe as "seminomads of the Lakk people, related to both the Lurs and the Kurds." According to Parviz Rajabi, the Zand tribe belonged to the Laks, who were a branch of the Kurds of Iran but counted as Lurs. Beatrice Forbes Manz wrote that they originated from the region "on the Luri-Kurdish border". Elton L. Daniel wrote that the Zand tribe had "obscure but Iranian origin".

Other scholars described the origin of the Zand tribe as "Kurdish-Lur", "from the Luristan-Kurdistan frontier", and "associated with either" the Kurds or Lurs. Marina Kunke wrote that the Tohfa-ye Shahi, a Safavid document describing nomadic tribes, estimated the Lurs at 117 groups spread across four main tribes, the Feyli, the Lak and Zand, the Bakhtiari, and the Mamasani, and added that the Lak and Zand were likely of Kurdish origin. According to Sheerin Ardalan, the Zand were often mentioned as Kurds by various Kurdish authors, European travelers, Ottoman and Persian historians, but were later increasingly mentioned as Lurs, including by Rostam al-Hokama, which became the dominant tradition in historiography despite not being fully accurate.

== History ==
The Sharafnama mentioned the Zand tribe, alongside the Laks, as minor Kurdish tribes who were Persian subjects. Zayn al-Abidin Shirvani listed the Lak tribes as Zand, Mafi, Bajalan, and Zandi-yi Kala, which was said to be the tribe of Karim Khan Zand. Others claimed Karim Khan belonged to the Bagala clan of the Zand tribe.

According to Tarikh-e Gitigusha, Nader Shah Afshar deported the Zand tribe to the Gaz valley in Khorasan after hearing of their bravery. Nader Shah deported around 6,000 families of the Shaqaqi tribe, who were used against the Afghans, alongside 300 families of the Zand tribe, to Khorasan. After the death of Nader Shah, the Zand tribe returned to their homeland while Karim Khan Zand established his power. The Zand tribe were mainly concentrated in Pari and Kamazan, two villages near Malayer. The wives of Karim Khan and his troops often fought beside their husbands in battle against the Afghans, and the Afghans made a point to heap scorn upon the victorious Zand units by accusing their men of "hiding behind their women’s skirts." During another battle, against the Afshars of Urmia, women of the Zand tribe helped free their husbands from chains and also fought.

During his power struggle against Karim Khan, Ali Mardan Khan Bakhtiari planned a mass killing of the Zand tribe and its generals after failed negotiations, although his Zand prisoners, Mohammad Khan Zand and Shaykh Ali Khan Zand, managed to kill him beforehand. The Zand tribe also had a conflict with the Qajar tribe over the Iranian monarchy. After the Qajar dynasty came to power, Agha Mohammad Khan Qajar tried to exterminate the Zand tribe and anyone associated with it. He began a long military campaign against the Zand tribe, especially royal heirs, and anyone else who sheltered them. In 2025, the Qajar campaigns against the Zand tribe were described as "shocking for its violence and destruction even by the standards of the day."

Part of the Zand tribe survived in Kurdistan province where they established themselves after being "wiped out and scattered" by the Qajars starting in 1797. They mainly lived between Sanandaj and Marivan, although their tribal tradition was less structured than that of the remote frontier tribes. There were other groups claiming descent from the Zands which may have disappeared relatively later. Schindler noted Lurs of the Zand tribe near Qom, while Beer noted a remnant of them among the Feyli Lurs, and Rabino encountered claimants of descent from Karim Khan in Kermanshah. Edmonds, Zaki, and Nikitine had also encountered "sundry pockets" of Kurdish Zands. Pierre Oberling noted eight villages in Bamposht, in Sistan and Baluchestan province, inhabited by Balochi-speaking Zands who descended from the soldiers accompanying Lotf Ali Khan on his flight to Bam. There were also some Qashqai tribes of Zand descent. In Fars province, the Bayati music system was known as Bayat-e Tork or Bayat-e Zand.
