= Golestaneh =

Golestaneh (Persian: گلستانه) may refer to:

== Places ==
- Golestaneh, Isfahan
- Golestaneh, Kashan, Isfahan Province
- Golestaneh, Kurdistan
- Golestaneh, Delfan, Lorestan Province
- Golestaneh, Rumeshkhan, Lorestan Province
- Golestaneh, West Azerbaijan
- Golestaneh, Zanjan

== People ==
- Abol-Hasan Golestaneh (fl. late 18th century), Iranian government official
- Hassan Golestaneh (born 1983), Iranian bodybuilding coach
