= Zand Iran =

Iran under the Zand dynasty from 1751 to 1794

Guarded Domains of Iran ممالک محروسه ایران (Persian) Mamâlek-e Mahruse-ye Irân
- 1751–1794
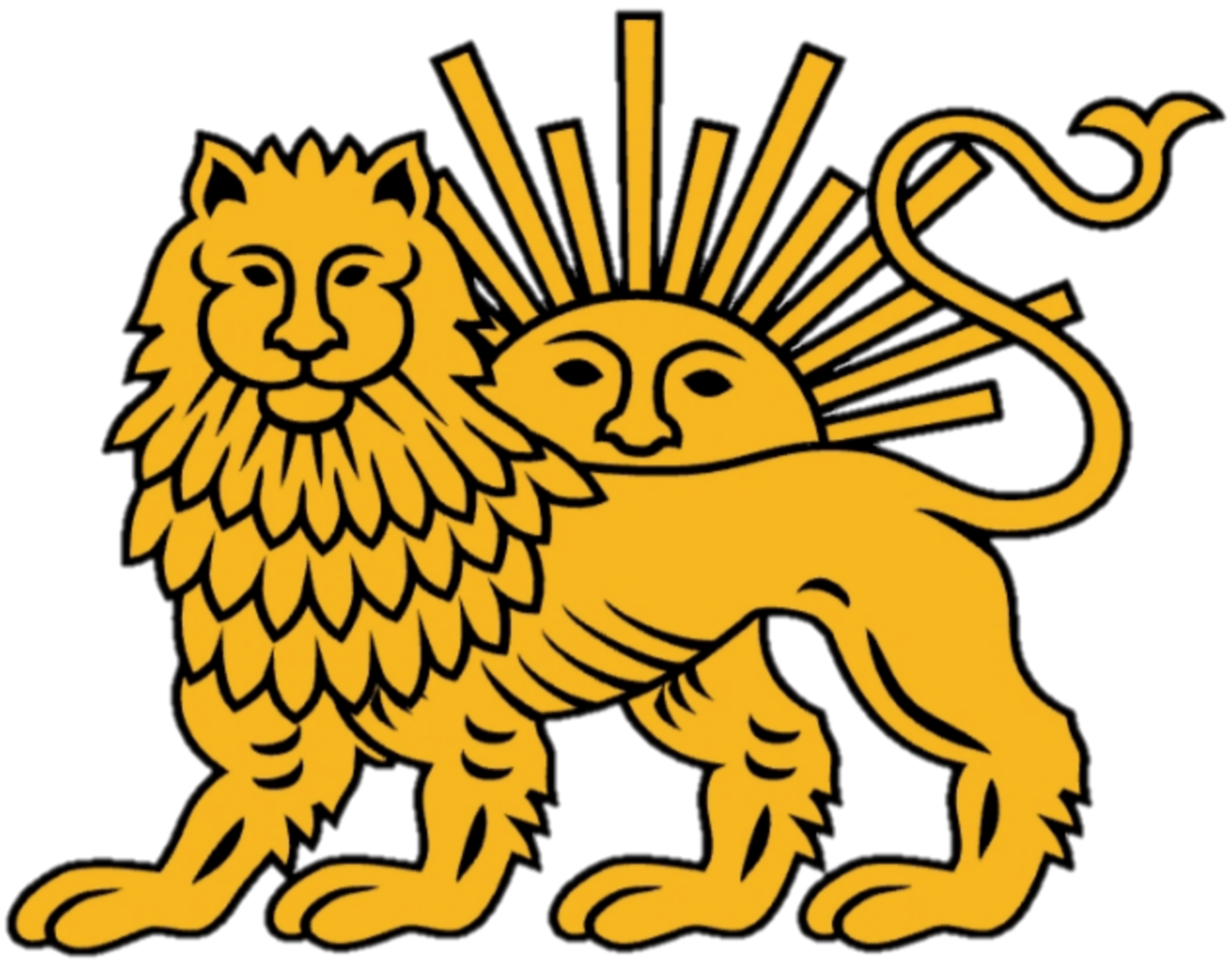
- Flag Emblem

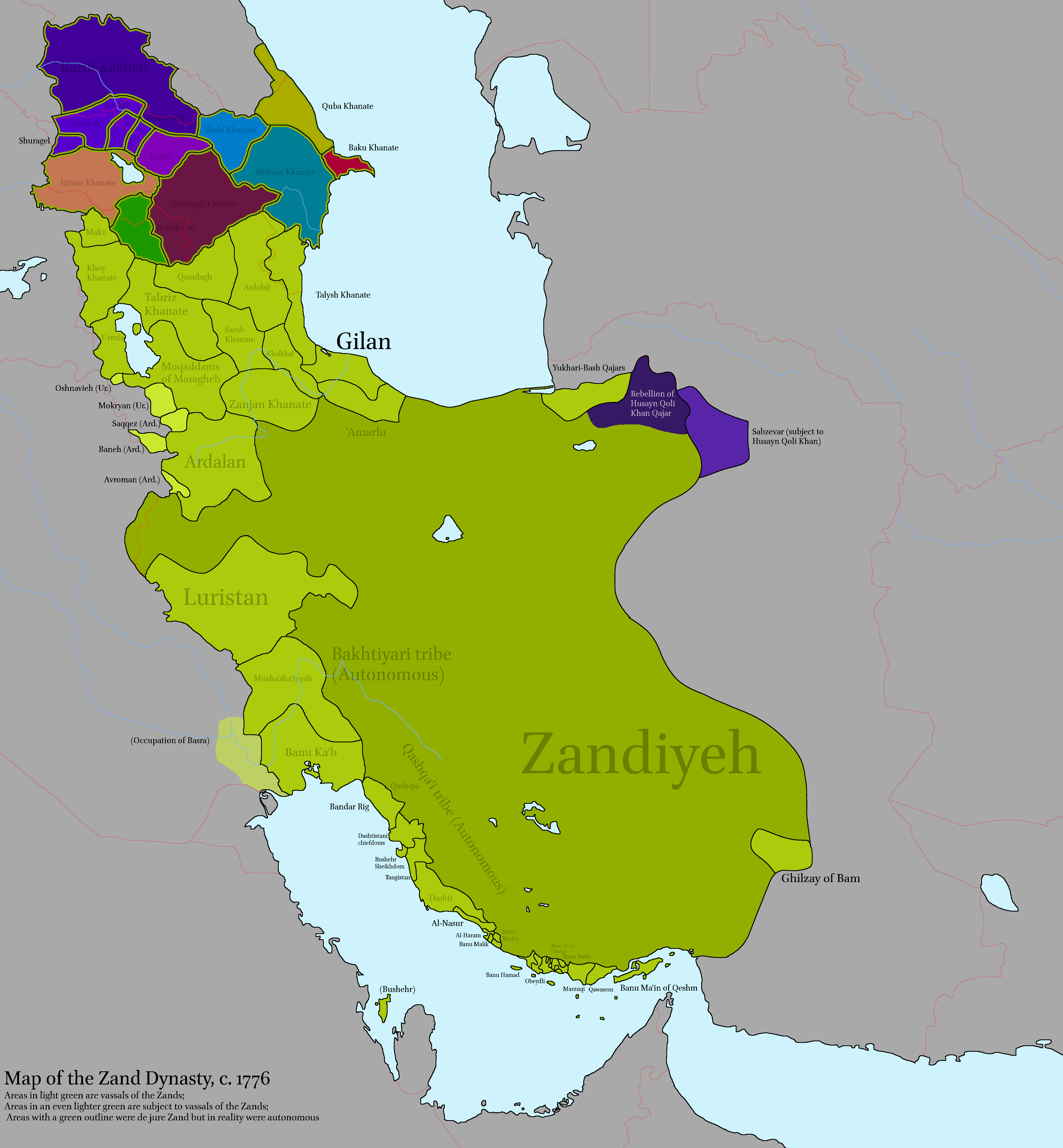
- Zand Iran at its zenith under Karim Khan in 1776.
- Capital: Shiraz (1762–1781; 1785–1792); Isfahan (1781–1785); Kerman (1792–1794)
- Common languages: Persian (official language, majority); Laki (dynastic)
- Religion: Twelver Shia Islam (official)
- Government: Monarchy
- Vakil ol-Ra'aya, Shah
  - 1751–1779: Karim Khan (first)
  - 1789–1794: Lotf Ali Khan (last)
- History
  - Established: 1751
  - Qajar conquest: 1794
Preceded by	Succeeded by
Afsharid Iran	Qajar Iran

The Guarded Domains of Iran, (Note: Persian: ممالک محروسه ایران) commonly known as Zand Iran, (Note: Persian: ایران زندی) was the Iranian state under the rule of the Zand dynasty. It initially ruled southern and central Iran in the 18th century, later expanding to include much of the rest of contemporary Iran (except for the province of Sistan and Baluchestan and the region of Khorasan excluding Sabzevar) as well as parts of Iraq. The lands of present-day Armenia, Azerbaijan, and Georgia were controlled by khanates which were de jure part of the Zand realm, but the region was de facto autonomous. The island of Bahrain was also held for the Zands by the autonomous Al-Mazkur sheikhdom of Bushehr.

The reign of its founder and most important ruler, Karim Khan Zand (r. 1751–1779), was marked by peace and prosperity. With its capital at Shiraz, arts and architecture flourished under Karim Khan's reign, with some themes in architecture being revived from nearby sites of pre-Islamic Achaemenid (550–330 BC) and Sasanian (224–651 AD) eras. The tombs of the medieval Persian poets Hafez and Saadi Shirazi were also renovated by Karim Khan. Distinctive Zand art which was produced at the behest of the Zand rulers became the foundation of later Qajar arts and crafts. Following Karim Khan's death, Zand Iran went into decline due to internal disputes amongst members of the Zand dynasty. Its final ruler, Lotf Ali Khan Zand (r. 1789–1794), was eventually executed by Agha Mohammad Khan Qajar (r. 1789–1797) in 1794.

As noted by The Oxford Dictionary of Islam, "Karim Khan Zand holds an enduring reputation as the most humane Iranian rulers of the Islamic era". When, following the Islamic Revolution of 1979, names of Iran's past rulers became taboo, citizens of Shiraz refused to rename the Karim Khan Zand and Lotf Ali Khan Zand streets, the two main streets of Shiraz.

== Name ==
Since the Safavid era, Mamâlek-e Mahruse-ye Irân (Guarded Domains of Iran) was the common and official name of Iran. The idea of the Guarded Domains illustrated a feeling of territorial and political uniformity in a society where the Persian language, culture, monarchy, and Shia Islam became integral elements of the developing national identity. The concept presumably had started to form under the Mongol Ilkhanate in the late 13th-century, a period in which regional actions, trade, written culture, and partly Shia Islam, contributed to the establishment of the early modern Persianate world.

== History ==
=== Karim Khan Zand ===
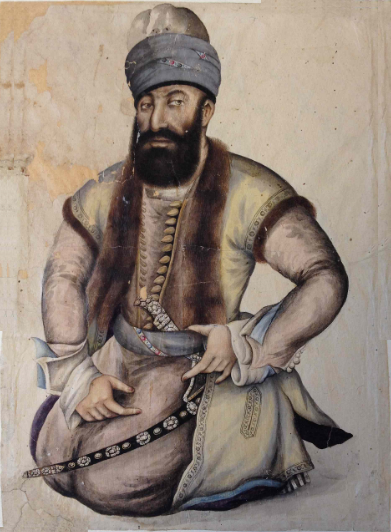
Contemporary portrait of Karim Khan Zand, the founder of the Zand dynasty (1751).

The dynasty was founded by Karim Khan Zand, chief of the Zand tribe, which is a tribe of Laks, a branch of Lurs who may have been originally Kurdish. Nader Shah moved the Zand tribe from their home in the Zagros mountains to the eastern steppes of Khorasan. After Nader's death, the Zand tribe, under the guidance of Karim Khan, returned to their original land. After Adel Shah was made king Karim Khan and his soldiers defected from the army and along with Ali Morad Khan Bakhtiari and Abolfath Khan Haft Lang, two other local chiefs, became a major contender but was challenged by several adversaries. Abolfath Khan was the Vizier, Karim Khan became the army chief commander and Ali Morad Khan became the regent.

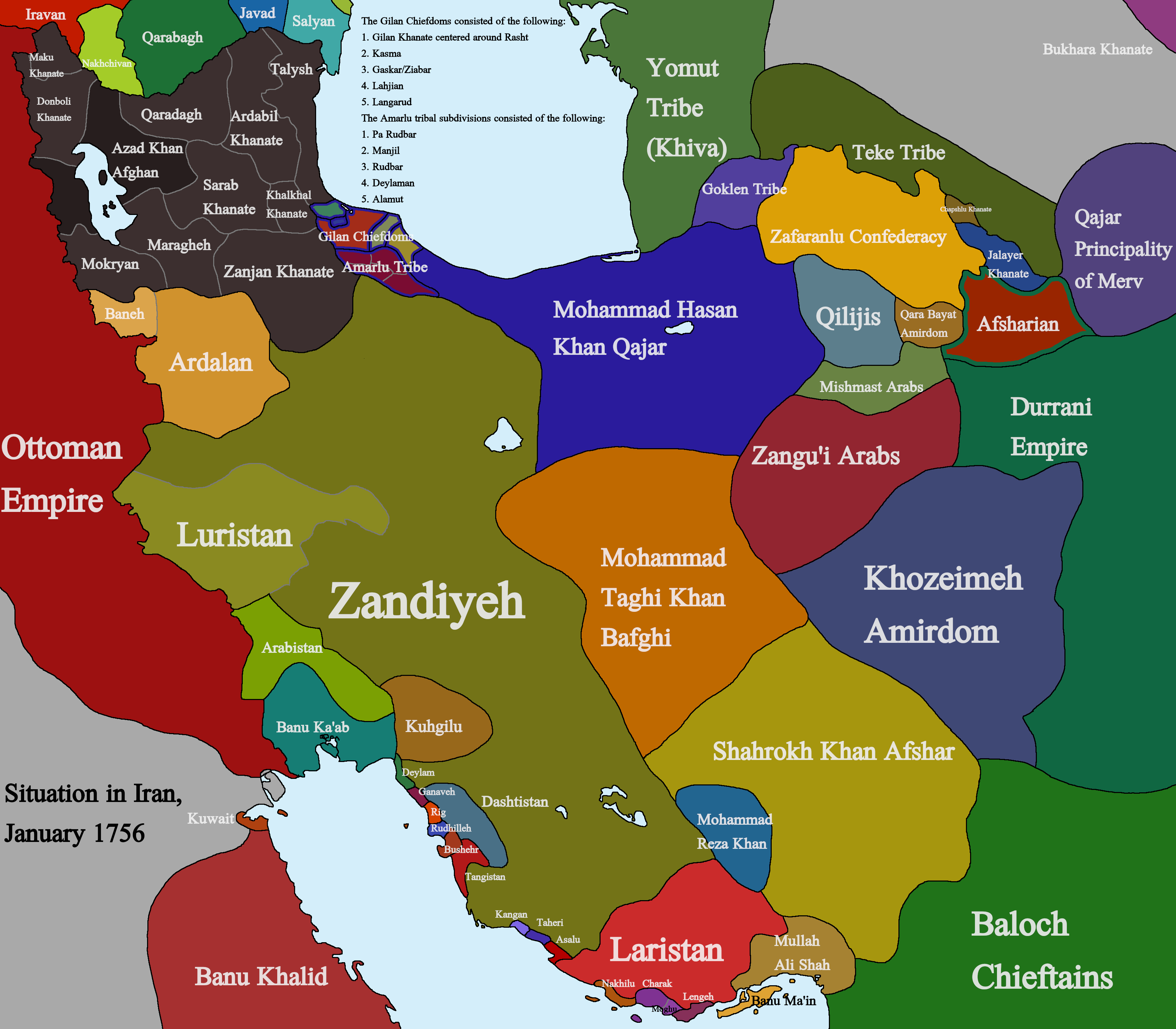
Map of Iran in January 1756

Karim Khan declared Shiraz his capital, and in 1778 Tehran became the second capital. He gained control of Iran's central and southern regions, and occupied Basra from the Ottomans. In order to add legitimacy to his claim, Karim Khan placed the infant Shah Ismail III, the grandson of the last Safavid shah, on the throne in 1757. Ismail was a figurehead shah and real power was vested in Karim Khan. Karim Khan chose to be the military commander and Alimardan Khan was the civil administrator. Soon enough Karim Khan managed to eliminate his partner as well as the puppet shah and in 1760, founded his own dynasty. He refused the title of shah and instead named himself Vakil ol-Ro'aya (Advocate of the People).

By 1760, Karim Khan had defeated all his rivals and controlled all of Iran except Khorasan, in the northeast, which was ruled by Shahrokh Shah. His foreign campaigns against Azad Khan in Azerbaijan and against the Ottomans in Mesopotamia brought Azerbaijan and the province of Basra into his control. But he never stopped his campaigns against his arch-enemy, Mohammad Hassan Khan Qajar, the chief of the Qoyunlu Qajars. The latter was finally defeated by Karim Khan and his sons, Agha Mohammad Khan Qajar and Hossein Qoli Khan Qajar, were brought to Shiraz as hostages.

Karim Khan's monuments in Shiraz include the famous Arg of Karim Khan, Vakil Mosque, Vakil Bazaar, Vakil Bathhouse, and several mosques and gardens. He is also responsible for building of a palace in the town of Tehran, the future capital of the Qajar dynasty.

=== Decline and fall ===
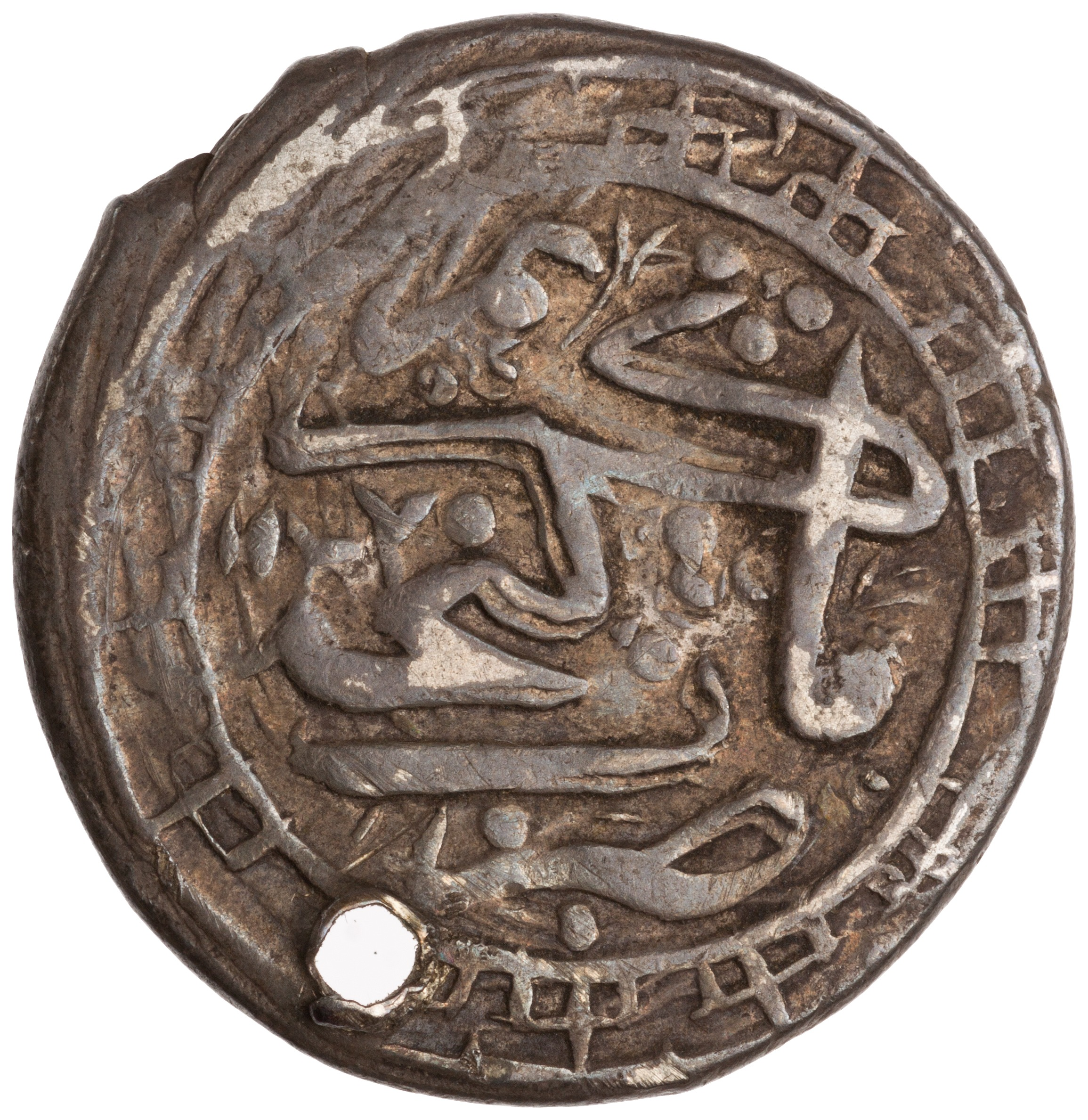
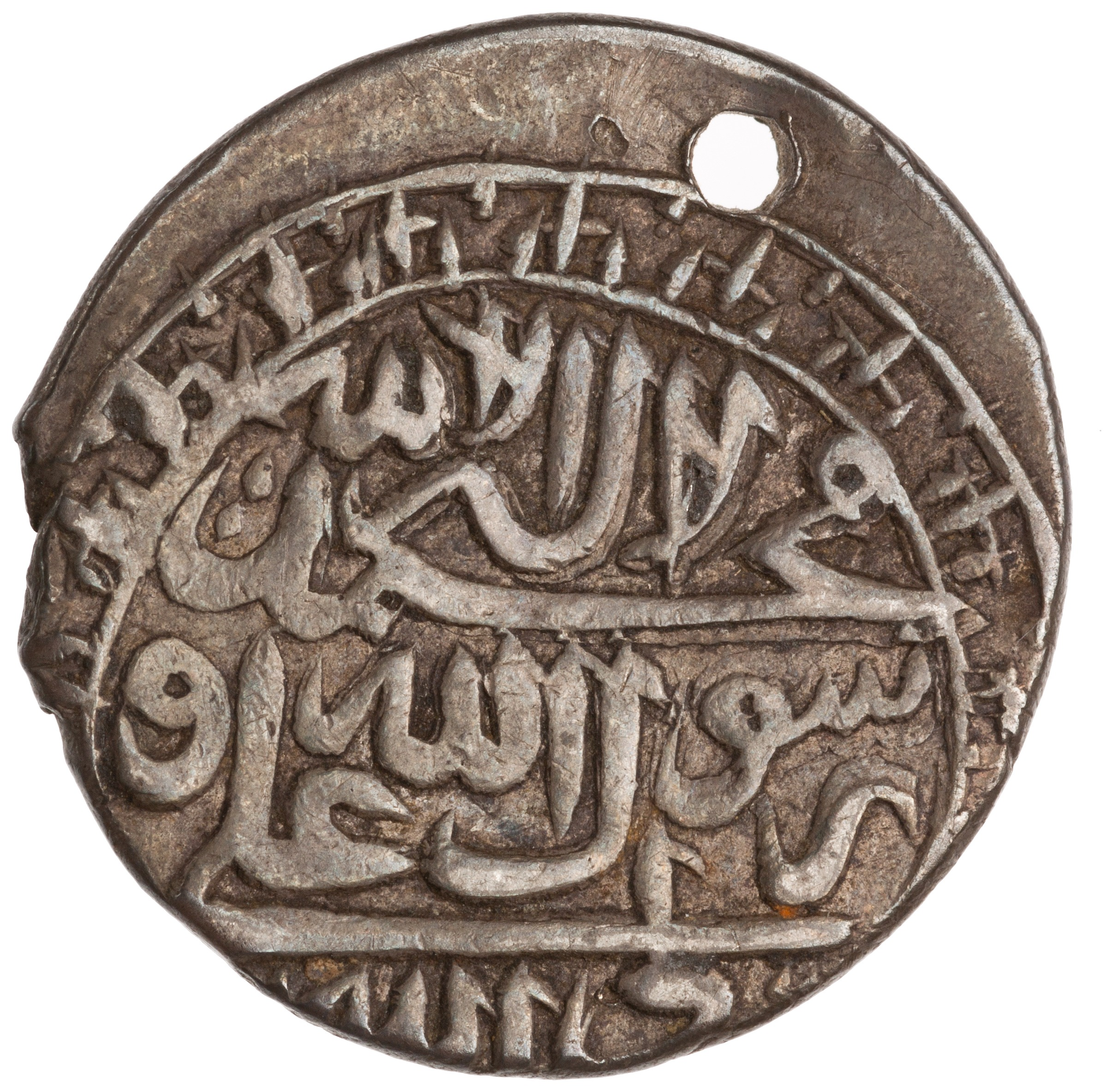
Silver coin of Karim Khan Zand, minted in Ganja, dated 1763/4 (left = obverse; right = reverse)

Karim Khan's death in 1779 left his territory vulnerable to threats from his enemies. His son and successor, Abol-Fath Khan Zand, was an incompetent ruler who was heavily influenced by his half uncle (and Karim Khan's commander), Zaki Khan. Other rulers, such as Ali-Morad Khan and Jafar Khan, also failed to follow the policies of Karim Khan and soon enough, the country was under attack from all sides.

The biggest allies of the Zands, the House of Ardalan, who were weakened after the Ottoman-backed House of Baban invaded their capital, had been defeated by the emerging Qajars and agreed to accept Qajar rule in exchange for keeping their automomy. The Qajars, after intermarrying with the Ardalan, were able to influence their internal affairs. Unlike Baban, Ardalan actually had influence in the court that it owed its loyalty to.

The biggest enemies of the Zands, the Qajar chiefs, led by the former hostage, Agha Mohammad Khan, were advancing fast against the declining kingdom. Finally, in 1789, Lotf Ali Khan, a grand-nephew of Karim Khan, declared himself the new shah. His reign (until 1794) was spent mostly in war with the Qajar khan. He was finally captured and brutally killed in the fortress of Bam, putting an effective end to the Zand dynasty.

Politically, it is also important that the Zands, especially Karim Khan, chose to call themselves Vakil ol-Ro'aya (Advocate of the People) instead of shahs. Other than the obvious propaganda value of the title, it can be a reflection of the popular demands of the time, expecting rulers with popular leanings instead of absolute monarchs who were totally detached from the population, like the earlier Safavids.

== Foreign policy ==
In foreign policy, Karim Khan attempted to revive Safavid era trade by allowing the British to establish a trading post in the port of Bushehr. This opened the hands of the British East India Company in Iran and increased their influence in the country. The taxation system was reorganised in a way that taxes were levied fairly. The judicial system was fair and generally humane. Capital punishment was rarely implemented.

== Art ==
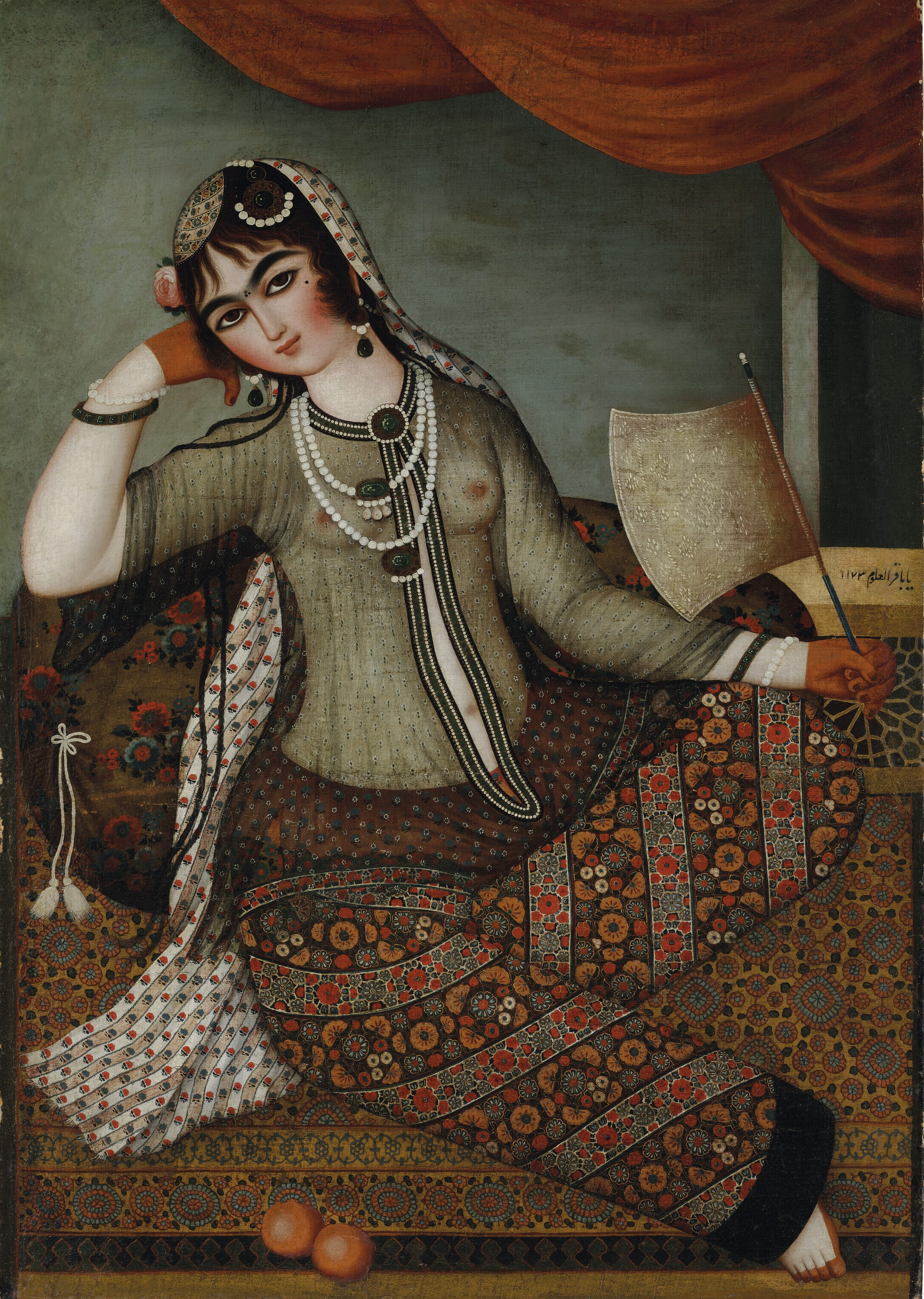
A Reclining Beauty by Mohammad Baqer, circa 1759/60

The Zand era was a time of relative peace and economic growth for the country. Many territories that were captured by the Ottomans in the late Safavid era were retaken, and Iran was once again a coherent and prosperous country. From 1765 onwards Karim Khan promoted art and architecture at his capital Shiraz.

After Iranian painting reached its height at the end of the 17th century, a special school of painting took shape during the Zand era in the 17th and 18th centuries. Painting thrived under Karim Khan, and notable paintings from this era include Muhammad Karim Khan Zand and the Ottoman Ambassador which was created c. 1775. The most important painter of the Zand era was Mohammad Sadiq. The art of this era is remarkable and, despite the short length of the dynasty, a distinct Zand art had the time to emerge. Many Qajar artistic traits were copied from the Zand examples and Zand art became the foundation of Qajar arts and crafts. Following Karim Khan's death, the Zand dynasty became embroiled in disputes over succession and other intrigues, which put a halt to further significant patronage of the arts.

=== Architecture ===
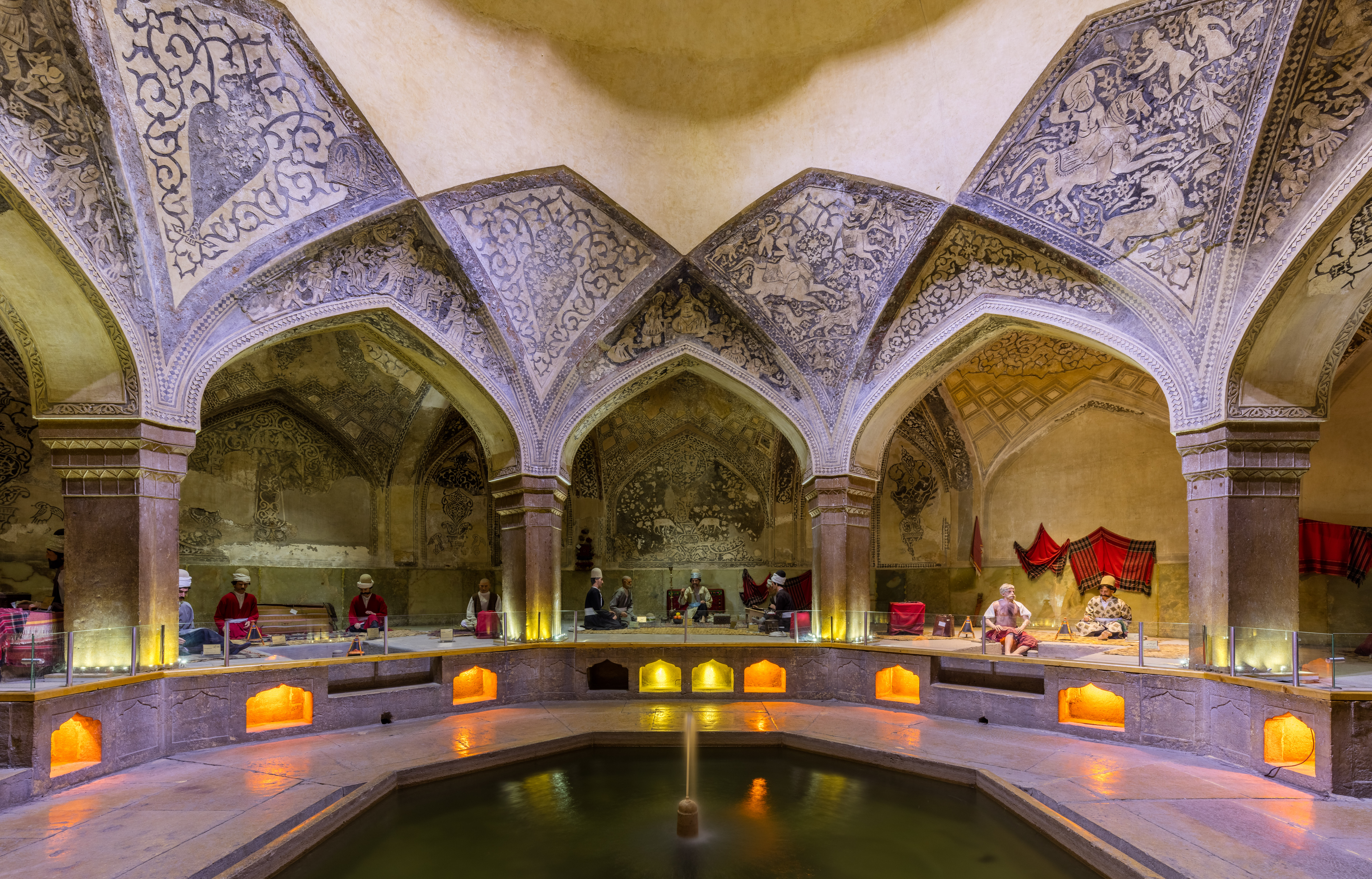
Vakil Bathhouse

Karim Khan's first architectural considerations were focussed on defense and he therefore rebuilt the city walls of Shiraz in 1767. He decorated Shiraz with new buildings including the Arg of Karim Khan, the Vakil Bazaar and the Kulah-e Farangi and grouped these around a public square (maidan in Persian). Zand-era architecture is notable in Iranian history for "its revetments in carved marble and overglaze-painted tiles with flowers, animals and people". The Grove Encyclopedia of Islamic Art and Architecture notes that some themes employed by Zand architecture were knowingly revived from the nearby ancient Achaemenid and Sasanian sites, such as Persepolis and Naqsh-e Rostam.

=== Cultural patronage ===
According to the Italian scholar Alessandro Bausani: "The eighteenth century, which in Europe (and partly also in India, for example) was a ferment of renewal, is the darkest and most sterile period in Persian literature and culture." Scholars of Persian literature have also made a similar conclusion. John Perry commented on these statements: "While regrettably true of literature, this view is somewhat too sweeping to be fair to the fine and applied arts." Like Nader Shah, Karim Khan was uninterested in poetry panegyric and had no more than a passing tolerance for history. He supported the court artisans and artists, albeit in an indifferent manner.

The numerous artists active during Karim Khan's time who were born in or educated in Isfahan, many of whom carry the surname "Esfahani," can be considered as representations of the lengthy political and cultural traditions of the Safavid court; they account for at least seventeen of the twenty-seven identified by Abu'l-Hasan Mostawfi Ghaffari. In the 1750s, some people—including the poet Hazin Lahiji—had immigrated to India. Others, like Vafa of Qom, departed for India under Nader Shah's rule but later came back to Iran under Karim Khan. During the interim period, a large number of people, primarily in the central region of Isfahan, Qom, and Kashan, remained in Iran. These people included Moshtaq, Azar Bigdeli, Hatef Esfahani, and Rafiq. Shiraz largely took up Isfahan's role as the patronage hub.

Seven calligraphers, including Mohammad Hashem Zargar, and least as many poets, including Azar Bigdeli, and the doctor Mirza Mohammad Nasir left Isfahan to settle in Shiraz. One of the factors behind Isfahan's loss as the literary center of Iran is reported by Abd al-Razzaq Beg Donboli. The city's poets, including Azar Bigdeli, were actively supported by the governor Mirza Abd ol-Vahhab Musavi. However, after the latters death in 1759/60, the governorship of Isfahan was given to the tyrannical figure Hajji Agha Mohammad Ranani. In 1763/64, disgruntled poets and other prominent individuals sent a delegation to Karim Khan in which they attempted to have Hajji Agha replaced. After their efforts were unsuccessful, some of them relocated to Shiraz.

== Imperial ideology ==
The distinguishing quality of Karim Khan's leadership came from his refusal to exercise royal authority independent of nominal Safavid sovereignty. However, his decision to continue serving as vakil al-dowleh ("deputy of the state") marked a subtle change from his previous role as the regent of a prince distantly related to the Safavid dynasty and of no importance. Moreover, he appears to have tacitly changed his authority from Safavid kingship to that of representing the people by using the title of Vakil ol-Ra'aya ("deputy of the people"). The subtle change reflected Karim Khan's standing among his subjects, particularly the urban people. He also drew on Iranian monarchy traditions that were directly related to the Fars province in order to distance himself from the distressing events of recent times.

Karim Khan attempted to recreate the territorial Iran of the Safavid era, just like Nader Shah and Agha Mohammad Khan. A common reference for consecutive rulers was Nader Shah's mention of Iran's established borders during the Safavid era. Karim Khan made use of the same justification for similar land dispute resolutions.

== Court and administration ==
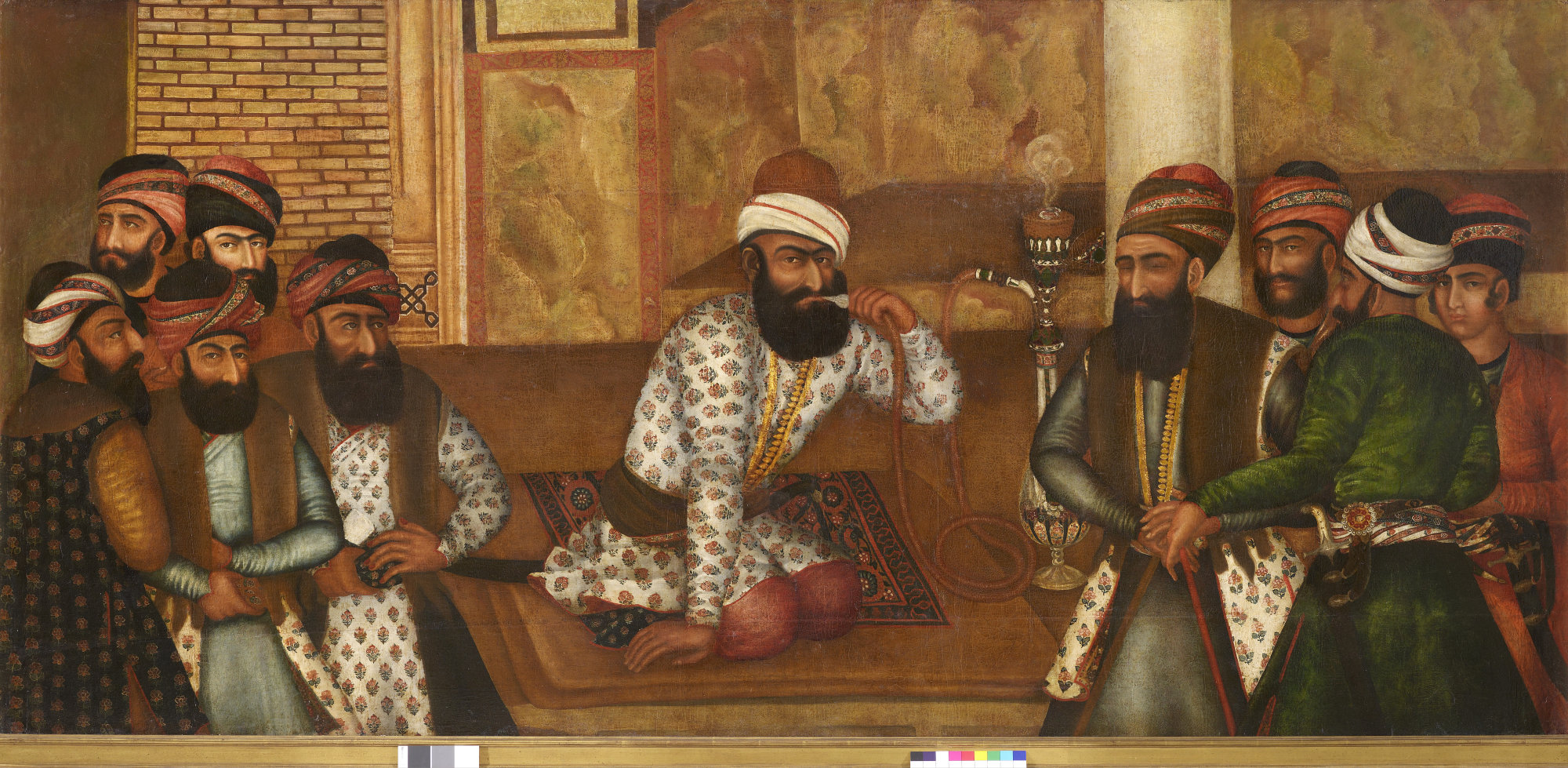
Karim Khan with his kinsmen and courtiers, from a mural in the Pars Museum, Shiraz

When compared to the complex structure of hierarchy and ceremony that distinguished the Safavid court, Karim Khan's household in Shiraz was smaller, simpler, and more focused on real administrative and military requirements than on the lavish displays of the Safavid shahs. The Zand nobility was a remnant of the Safavid nobility and was later almost entirely absorbed into the Qajar nobility. As with previous dynasties, the official language and court literature was in Persian, and the majority of the chancellors, ministers, and bureaucrats were well-educated and talented Persian speakers.

The central government was under the complete control of Karim Khan. Historical documents do contain occasional references to the established Safavid court offices and protocols under the Zands, but nothing suggests that the chief minister (etemad ol-dowleh, sadr-e azam) and resident court amirs (the qurchi-bashi, qollar-aghasi, eshik-aqasi-bashi, and tofangchi-aghasi) formed the "close council of state" as they did in the late Safavid era. Under Karim Khan, no government official attained significant importance. Instead, he gave his kinsmen and trusted tribal leaders the responsibility for military campaigns and governance. Local administrators, who were all directly accountable to him, were given charge of the provinces. When a Zand prince was given a title, it was more honorific rather than an official position in the government.

The vazir-e divan was Karim Khan's direct subordinate in the bureaucracy. The first to occupy that office under him was Mirza Aqil Esfahani, who was executed in 1763 and succeeded by Mirza Mohammad Ja'far Esfahani. The office of mostowfi ol-mamalek was almost equally important and was held by Mirza Mohammad Borujerdi and Mirza Mohammad Hossein Farahani in succession. Karim Khan treated the people holding these senior administrative and senior fiscal positions as nothing more than secretarial assistants, treating them more like friends than colleagues.

== Religious policy ==
Karim Khan might have been anticipated to seek the ulama's approval for his unusual position as the head of an nominally neo-Safavid (but in reality kingless) monarchy. However, he refused to comply with this. By minting coins under the name of the hidden imam, erecting mosques and shrines, and probably participating in Friday prayers—though this is not mentioned—Karim Khan supported Shia beliefs in a traditional manner. Abu'l-Hasan Qazvini, who was one the more religious historians, claims that Karim Khan never prayed throughout his entire life. The government-appointed shaykh ol-eslam was the most important religious figure in Shiraz. His responsibilities seemed to be more constrained than those of his Safavid predecessors, and the title molla-bashi (chief theologian) created by Soltan Hoseyn was not retained.

Religious officers typically selected by the crown got degrees and set payments from Karim Khan, such as the guardian of the Shah Abdol-Azim Shrine at Ray in 1765 and the supervisor of religious activities at Qazvin. However, the lesser akhunds, theologians, seyyeds, and dervishes who anticipated living off of government pensions were let down. They were reportedly seen as parasites by Karim Khan, who claimed that by controlling pricing, they could live happily with what they had just like others. Presentations of the passion play, which reenacted the martyrdom of Husayn ibn Ali, gained popularity from Karim Khan's reign onward, possibly as a result of the more tolerant religious climate.

The relationship of the Zand state and Sufi orders had varied, with the Nematollahis, it was a negative kind, as Masum Ali Shah, the qotb of the order decided to return to Iran from India, settling in the capital of Shiraz and did his missionary work right after, however, under by the urgence of the ulama to Karim Khan of both heresy and usurping rule in Iran (due to having the title of "Shah"), Masum Ali was then banished to a village near Isfahan, after Karim Khan's death in 1779, Masum had moved to Isfahan proper, where he resumed his missionary works, where the ulama there as well, were severely hostile to him to the point where his followers were severely mutilated.

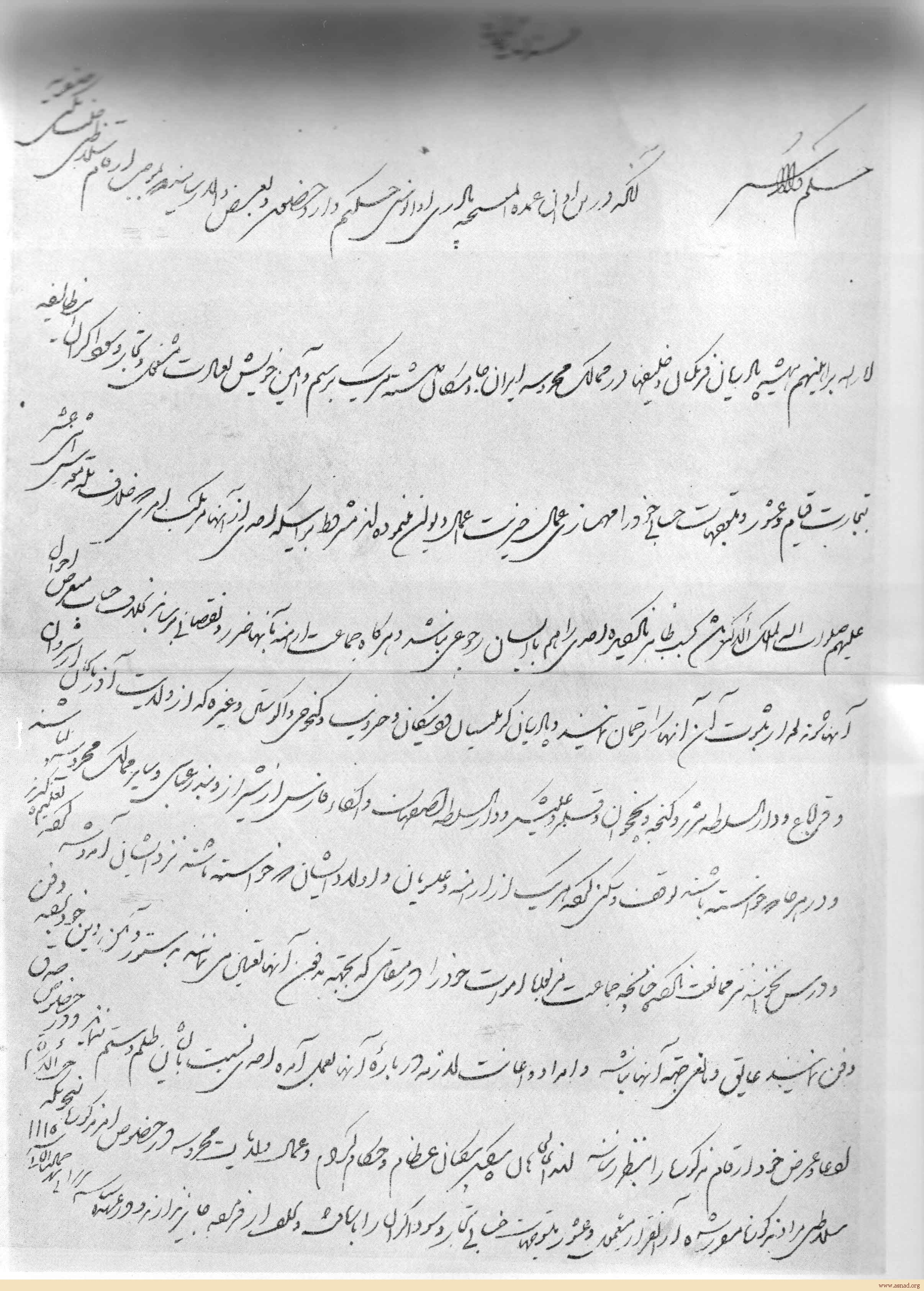
Farman by Ali-Morad Khan Zand ensures freedom of residence and religious practice for Christians, 1781

Both Karim Khan in 1764 and Ali-Morad Khan in 1781 issued farmans (royal edicts) that ensured freedom of residence, worship, and trade to Christian missionary groups in Iran, including the Carmelites, Benedictines, Jesuits, Capuchins, Augustinians, and others. The only requirement was that they behaved in a manner that did not anger the Shia and its supporters.

== Population ==
Roughly between the 1730s and the 1780s, hundreds of literate and renowned Iranians escaped to India due to the devastating circumstances. Many of them, including Abol-Hasan Golestaneh, expressed regret. The latter was a hostage in Karim Khan's entourage during the struggle for supremacy in western Iran, but in 1756 he managed to escape to the Shia shrine city of Najaf and subsequently to India, where he reunited with his family. Three of his uncles had served Nader Shah, but two of them fell out of favor and fled to India. His Mojmel al-tavarikh, a comprehensive history of the early Zand era, was written there in Murshidabad in 1782. Native Jews, Armenians, and other Christians, who were frequent targets of extortion and persecution, also migrated in very large numbers. Between 1742 and 1758, refugees settled in Mughal India, Bengal, Ottoman Iraq and Yemen, giving rise to a new generation of Iranians and Armenians. Baghdad and the adjacent shrine towns were home to an estimated 100,000 Iranian refugees, and Basra was claimed to be two-thirds occupied by refugees.

While European and Iranian emigrants eagerly scanned the horizon for signs that "Persia would soon be reunited under one chief, which would undoubtedly lead to the reestablishment of trade, so long interrupted," rumors of Karim Khan's victories and of his fair rule started to spread in the mid-1750s, which convinced many refugees to return. By 1760, every day refugees were returning to Iran. Thousands of them from all social classes arrived along the now-secure caravan routes.

The population of Isfahan had decreased to perhaps 20,000 by 1750 from what may have been between 250,000 and 500,000 during the Safavid era. It increased to an estimated 40,000–50,000 by 1772. Even though Shiraz appeared to be "demolished and destroyed... altogether depopulated and empty of Christians" in 1756, refugees from Isfahan, especially Armenians from the suburb of New Julfa, were already making their way there every day. According to John R. Perry; "There are no contemporary estimates of the population of Shiraz under the Vakil, but it seems reasonable to assume that between 1759 and 1779 it grew at a much faster rate than Isfahan, reaching roughly the same population as the latter, though within a much more compact urban area."

Shiraz lost around half of its population following its sack by Agha Mohammad Khan, numbering 20,000. Other cities in central Iran, like Qom, reportedly experienced a revival under Karim Khan's rule after suffering under the Afghans, Afsharids and the Zand-Qajar conflicts.

=== Armenians and Jews ===
Many of the Armenians of New Julfa and Peria who had fled Iran, returned to the country by settling in Shiraz, which welcomed their return. The Armenian population in Shiraz, whose quarter was located in the western corner by the Kazerun Gate, was primarily engaged in viticulture and wine trade. They also had their own mayor, and the government promoted their settlement by granting them villages around the capital. Mkrtic Vardapet, the Armenian prelate, divided his time between New Julfa and Shiraz every year for six months. Shiraz became the largest Jewish hub in Iran as a result of the return of many Jews, whose population may have decreased by about 20,000 between 1747 and 1779. They paid a special tax in exchange for being given their own section of land west of the bazaar. Although they seemed to be struggling financially in 1765, they were not the target of any persecution until after Karim Khan's death in 1779.

== Coinage ==
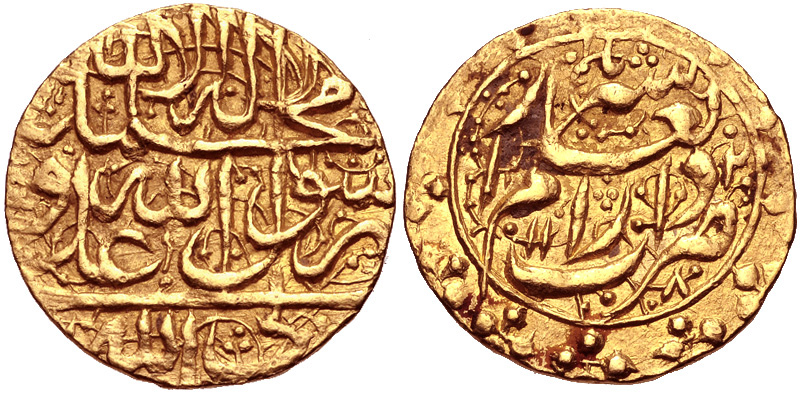
Gold coin of Karim Khan, minted in Shiraz

Various anonymous or semi-anonymous currencies were struck by Karim Khan and his successors, but the abbasi of 4.6 gram and the rupee of 11.5 gram seemed to be the most common. Isfahan, Kashan, Yazd, Shiraz, Tabriz, Qazvin, Rasht, Mazandaran, and the court mint were the main coin mints under Karim Khan. There was no monetary unity in Iran even though Karim Khan was acknowledged as the overlord of the majority of the country after 1763, as many regions remained independent or semi-autonomous. This was especially true for the semi-autonomous local khans that controlled the Caspian and Caucasian regions, as well as Khorasan, which was ruled by the Durranids and Afsharids.

A number of these khanates, including Ganja, Shirvan, Shaki, Derbent, and Karabakh, produced their own coins, first in the name of Nader Shah and then in the name of Karim Khan. A large portion of their coinage was completely nameless by the end of the 18th-century. While a few uncommon issues of Derbent contain a vague reference to one of their khans, none of the khans ever put their names on their coins, due to lacking the legitimacy of a sovereign monarch and any claims to independence. These northern Iranian coins were made entirely of silver and copper.

== Legacy ==
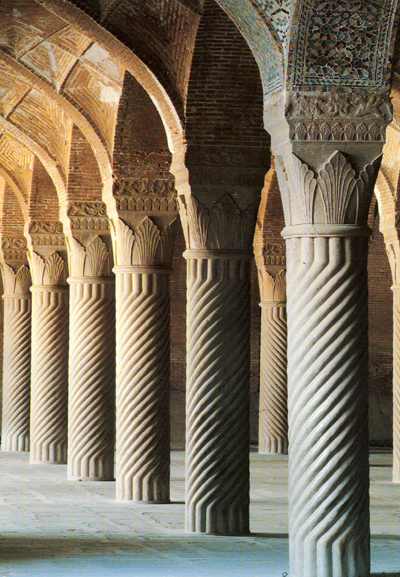
Vakeel mosque, Shiraz.

As noted by The Oxford Dictionary of Islam, "Karim Khan Zand holds an enduring reputation as the most humane Iranian ruler of the Islamic era". Karim Khan is the subject of many stories about his "kindness, generosity and justice". The Oxford Encyclopedia of the Islamic World adds that he is described as "a model ruler who never took the title of Shah". The Zand entity of Karim Khan was at peace and the roads within the realm were reportedly free of bandits. Karim Khan rebuilt Shiraz, his capital, and decorated it with new buildings including the Arg of Karim Khan, the Vakil Bazaar and the Kulah-e Farangi. He also restored the tombs of the medieval Persian poets Hafez and Saadi Shirazi. Until this day, the inhabitants of Shiraz honor Karim Khan. When following the Iranian Revolution of 1979 the names of the past rulers of Iran became a taboo, the citizens of Shiraz refused to rename the Karim Khan Zand Street and Lotf-Ali Khan Zand Street, the two main streets of Shiraz.

== See also ==
- Zand tribe
- Zand dynasty
- List of monarchs of Iran
- List of Shia dynasties
- Iranian-Dutch War
- Ottoman–Iranian War 1775–1776
- Occupation of Bahrain 1783
- Siege of Kerman 1794

== Sources ==
- Akopyan, Alexander; Petrov, Pavel (2016). "The Coinage of Īrawān, Nakhjawān, Ganja and Qarabāḡ Khānates in 1747–1827". State Hermitage: 1–9.
- Amanat, Abbas (1997). Pivot of the Universe: Nasir Al-Din Shah Qajar and the Iranian Monarchy, 1831–1896. I.B.Tauris. ISBN 9781860640971.
- Amanat, Abbas (2012). "Introduction: Iranian Identity Boundaries: A Historical Overview". In Amanat, Abbas; Vejdani, Farzin (eds.). Iran Facing Others: Identity Boundaries in a Historical Perspective. Palgrave Macmillan. pp. 1–38. ISBN 978-1137013408.
- Amanat, Abbas (2017). Iran: A Modern History. Yale University Press. ISBN 978-0300112542.
- Amanat, Abbas (2019). "Remembering the Persianate". In Amanat, Abbas; Ashraf, Assef (eds.). The Persianate World: Rethinking a Shared Sphere. Brill. pp. 15–62. ISBN 978-90-04-38728-7.
- Atabaki, Touraj (2012). "Iranian History in Transition: Recasting the Symbolic Identity of Babak Khorramdin". In Amanat, Abbas; Vejdani, Farzin (eds.). Iran Facing Others: Identity Boundaries in a Historical Perspective. Palgrave Macmillan. pp. 65–80. ISBN 978-1137013408.
- Yarshater, Ehsan (2016) [2004]. "Iran ii. Iranian History (2) Islamic period (page 4)". In Yarshater, Ehsan (ed.). Encyclopædia Iranica (Online ed.). Encyclopædia Iranica Foundation.
- Katouzian, Homa (2007). Iranian History and Politics: The Dialectic of State and Society. Routledge. ISBN 978-0415297547.
- Matthee, Rudi; Floor, Willem; Clawson, Patrick (2013). The Monetary History of Iran: From the Safavids to the Qajars. I.B.Tauris. ISBN 978-0-85772-172-3.
- Matthee, Rudi (2018). "Historiographical Reflections on the Eighteenth Century in Iranian History: Decline and Insularity, Imperial Dreams, or Regional Specificity?". In Axworthy, Michael (ed.). Crisis, Collapse, Militarism and Civil War: The History and Historiography of 18th Century Iran. Oxford University Press. pp. 21–43. ISBN 978-0-19-025033-1.
- Perry, John R. (1979). Karim Khan Zand: A History of Iran, 1747–1779. University of Chicago Press. ISBN 978-0226660981.
- Perry, John R. (2015) [2011]. "Karim Khan Zand". In Yarshater, Ehsan (ed.). Encyclopædia Iranica (Online ed.). Encyclopædia Iranica Foundation.
- Perry, John R. (2016) [2000]. "Zand Dynasty". In Yarshater, Ehsan (ed.). Encyclopædia Iranica (Online ed.). Encyclopædia Iranica Foundation.
- Perry, John R. (2022). "Sir William Jones and the Migration of the Idea of Iran to India". In Melville, Charles Melville (ed.). The Contest for Rule in Eighteenth-Century Iran: Idea of Iran Vol. 11. I.B.Tauris. pp. 215–226. ISBN 978-0755645992.
- Tucker, Ernest (2020). "Karīm Khān Zand". In Fleet, Kate; Krämer, Gudrun; Matringe, Denis; Nawas, John; Rowson, Everett (eds.). Encyclopaedia of Islam, THREE. Brill Online.
