= Vakil Bathhouse =

Old public bath in Shiraz, Iran

Vakil Bath
- حَمـّامِ وَکیل
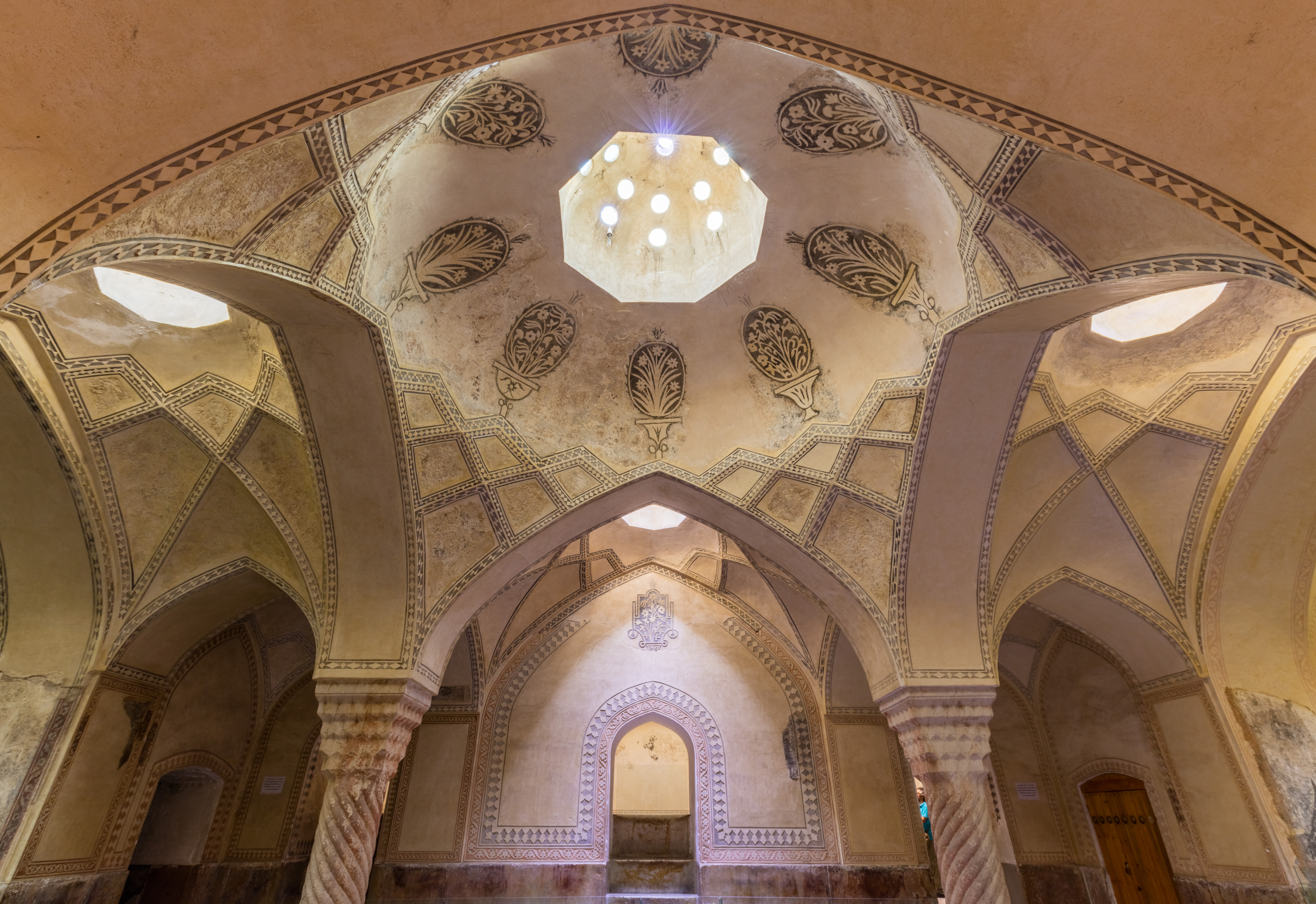
- the hot room (garmkhaneh) of the Vakil Bath

- Location within Middle East

General information
- Architectural style: Persian
- Location: Shiraz, Iran
- Coordinates: 29.61477°N 52.54512°E
- Construction started: mid 1760s
- Completed: late 1760

Technical details
- Structural system: Public Bath (Welfare)
- Size: 4,000 m² (presumed)

Design and construction
- Architect: Karim Khan Zand
- Engineer: A team of engineers all from Zand territories

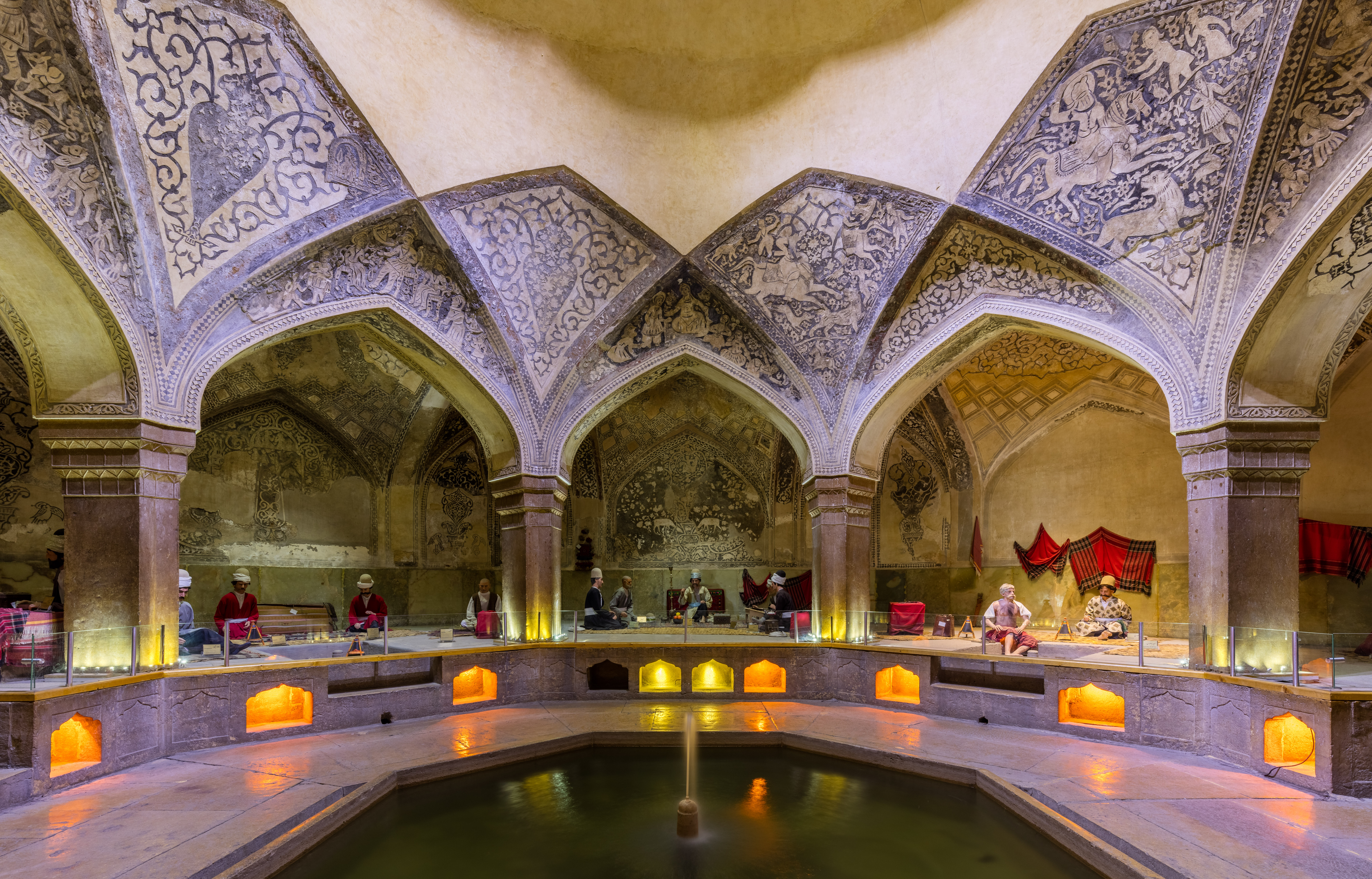
The sarbineh (changing room or vestibule) of the baths

Vakil Bath, Wakil Bath, or Wakil Hammam (Persian: حمام وکیل) is a Zand era public bathhouse (hammam) in Shiraz, Iran. It was a part of the royal district constructed during Karim Khan Zand's reign (1751–1779) which included the Arg of Karim Khan, Vakil Bazaar, and Vakil Mosque, among other administrative buildings. It is located in the historical center of Shiraz on the west side of the Vakil Mosque.

The hammam was originally intended for use by the nobility and continued to be in use up until the 20th century. After its closure as a bathhouse, it became an ethnographic museum with a series of costumed mannequins illustrating how Shirazis would have relaxed by the fountain after taking a bath.

It has since been restored and classified as a historic monument, inscribed with the number 917 on the list of national works of Iran.

== Description ==
The bathhouse's design includes a central courtyard with a pool that served both aesthetic and practical purposes. Its floors and walls are made of sarooj, a traditional waterproof mortar, ensuring the longevity of the structure.

The whole area is lighted by a series of bulbous glass skylights built in the vault pinnacles. Under the dome ceiling of the bath there are wall paintings featuring Persian mythology, epic, and religious narratives.

William Francklin, English orientalist and army officer, who was in Shiraz a few years after the bathhouse had been built, left a survey of the construction.
