= Vakil Mosque =

Mosque in Shiraz, Iran

- مسجد وکیل
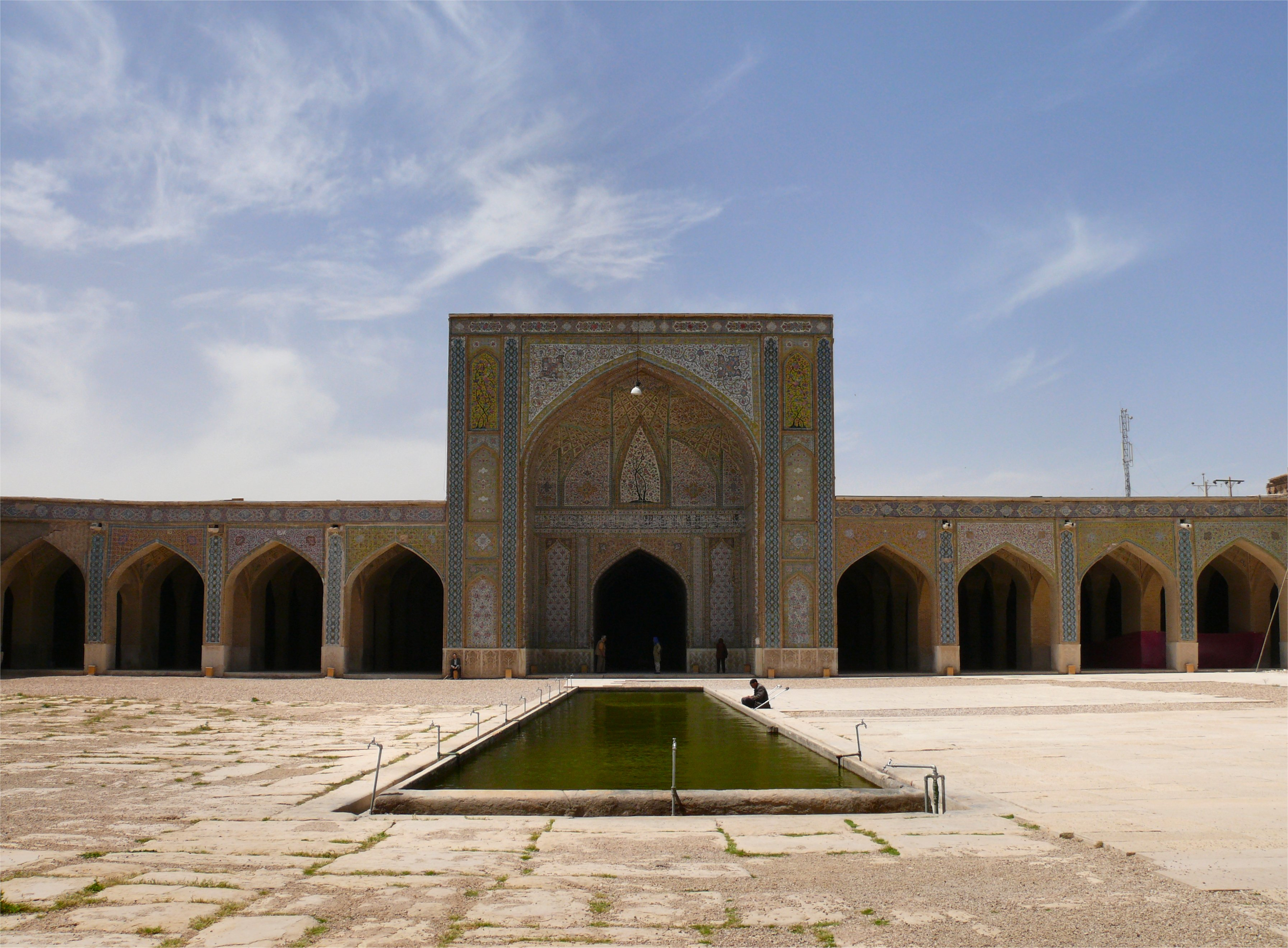
- View of southern iwan

- Location of the mosque in Iran

Religion
- Affiliation: Shia Islam
- Ecclesiastical or organisational status: Mosque
- Status: Active

Location
- Location: Shiraz, Fars
- Country: Iran
- Coordinates: 29°36′51.01″N 52°32′42.6″E

Architecture
- Type: Mosque architecture
- Style: Iranian
- Founder: Karim Khan
- Groundbreaking: 1164 AH (1750/1751 CE)
- Completed: 1187 AH (1773/1774 CE)

Specifications
- Minaret: Two
- Site area: 8,660 m^{2} (93,200 sq ft)
- Materials: Maragheh marble

Iran National Heritage List
- Official name: Vakil Mosque
- Type: Mosque
- Designated: 1932
- Reference no.: 182
- Conservation organization: Cultural Heritage, Handicrafts and Tourism Organization of Iran

The Vakil Mosque (Persian: مسجد وکیل, romanized: Masjed-e Vakil) is a Shi'ite mosque, located in Shiraz, in the province of Fars, in southern Iran. The mosque is situated to the west of Vakil Bazaar and adjacent to the entrance of the bazaar.

The mosque was added to the Iran National Heritage List in 1932, administered by the Cultural Heritage, Handicrafts and Tourism Organization of Iran.

== Overview ==
The mosque was built between 1164 AH (1750/1751 CE) and 1187 AH (1773/1774 CE), during the Zand era and was restored in the 19th century, during the Qajar era. Vakil means regent, which was the title used by Karim Khan, the founder of the Zand dynasty. Shiraz was the seat of Karim Khan's government and he endowed many buildings, including this mosque.

The Vakil Mosque covers an area of 8,660 square metres (93,200 sq ft). It has two iwans instead of the usual four, on the northern and southern sides of a large open sahn, that is 65 by 60 metres (213 by 197 ft) and a smaller yard that is 35 by 20 metres (115 by 66 ft). There are 48 great spiral pillars that are a feature of the mosque's prayer hall.

== Gallery ==
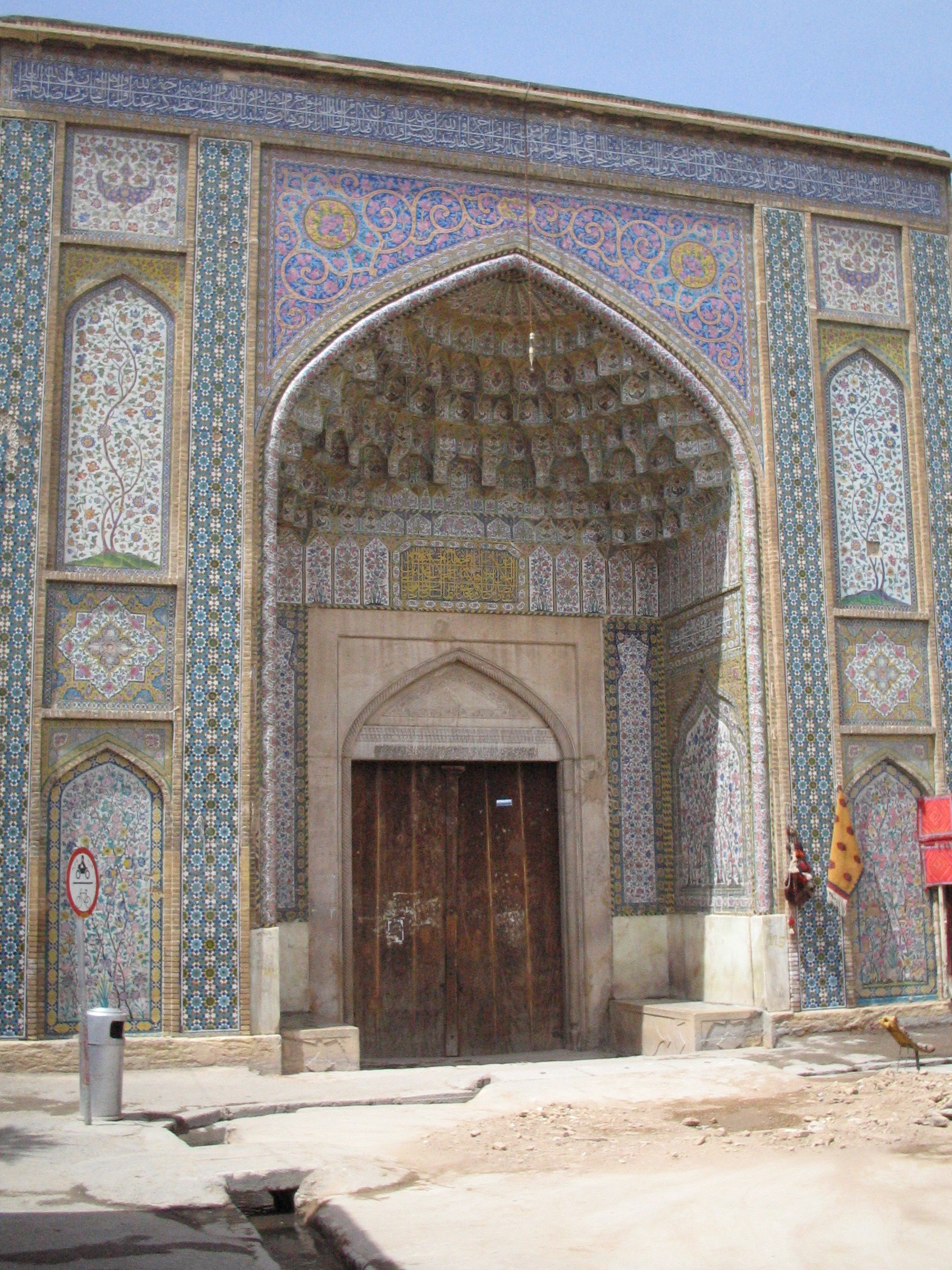
Entrance door

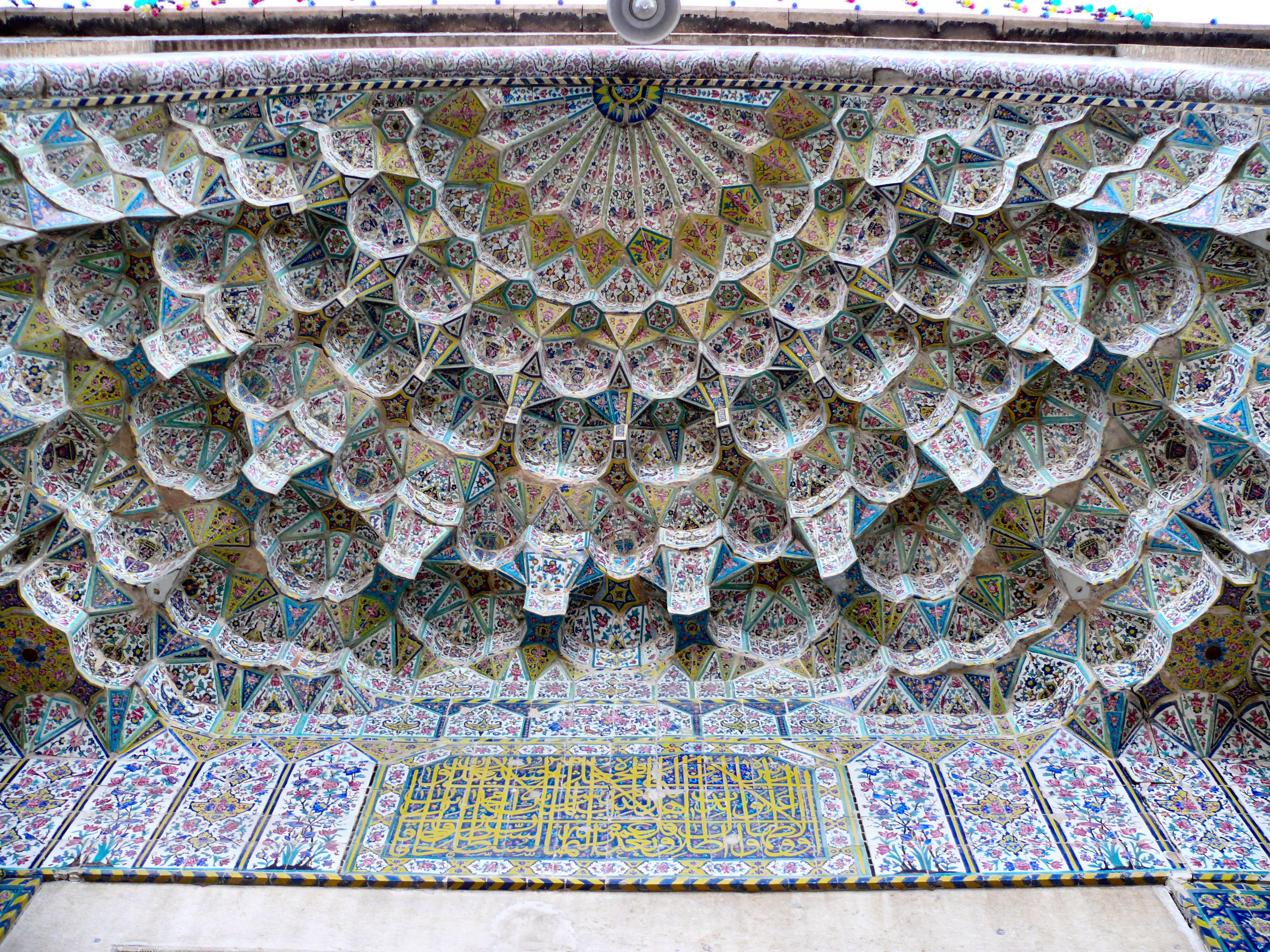
Entrance door ceiling featuring muqarnas

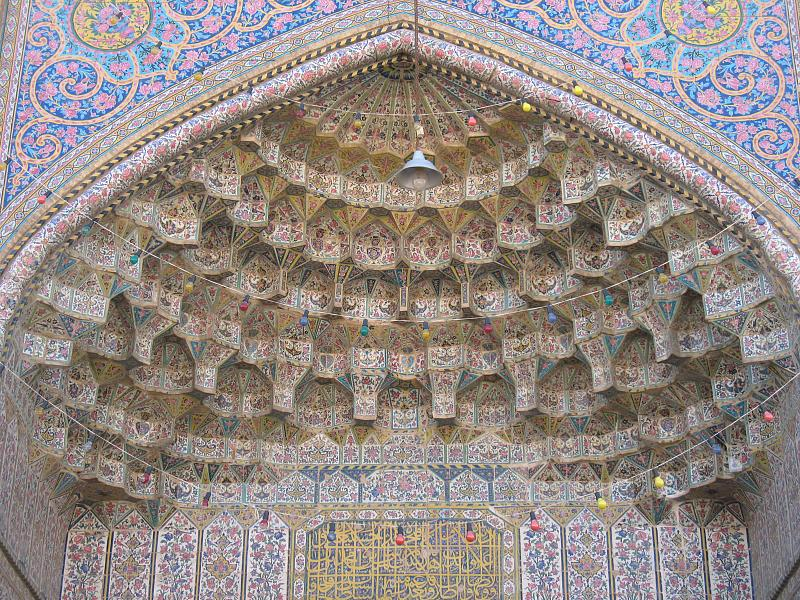
Facade of entrance arcade

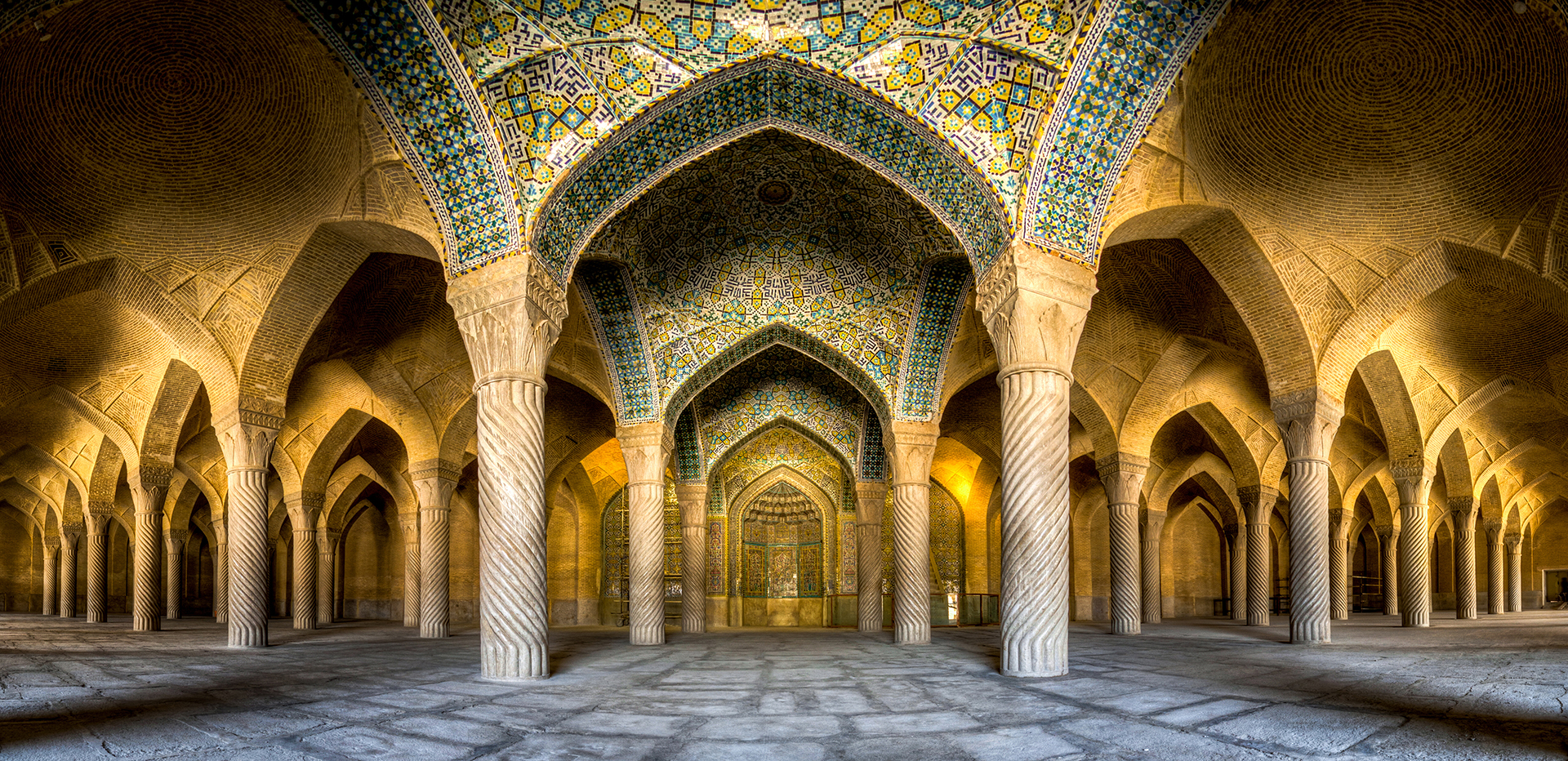
Shabestan (prayer hall)

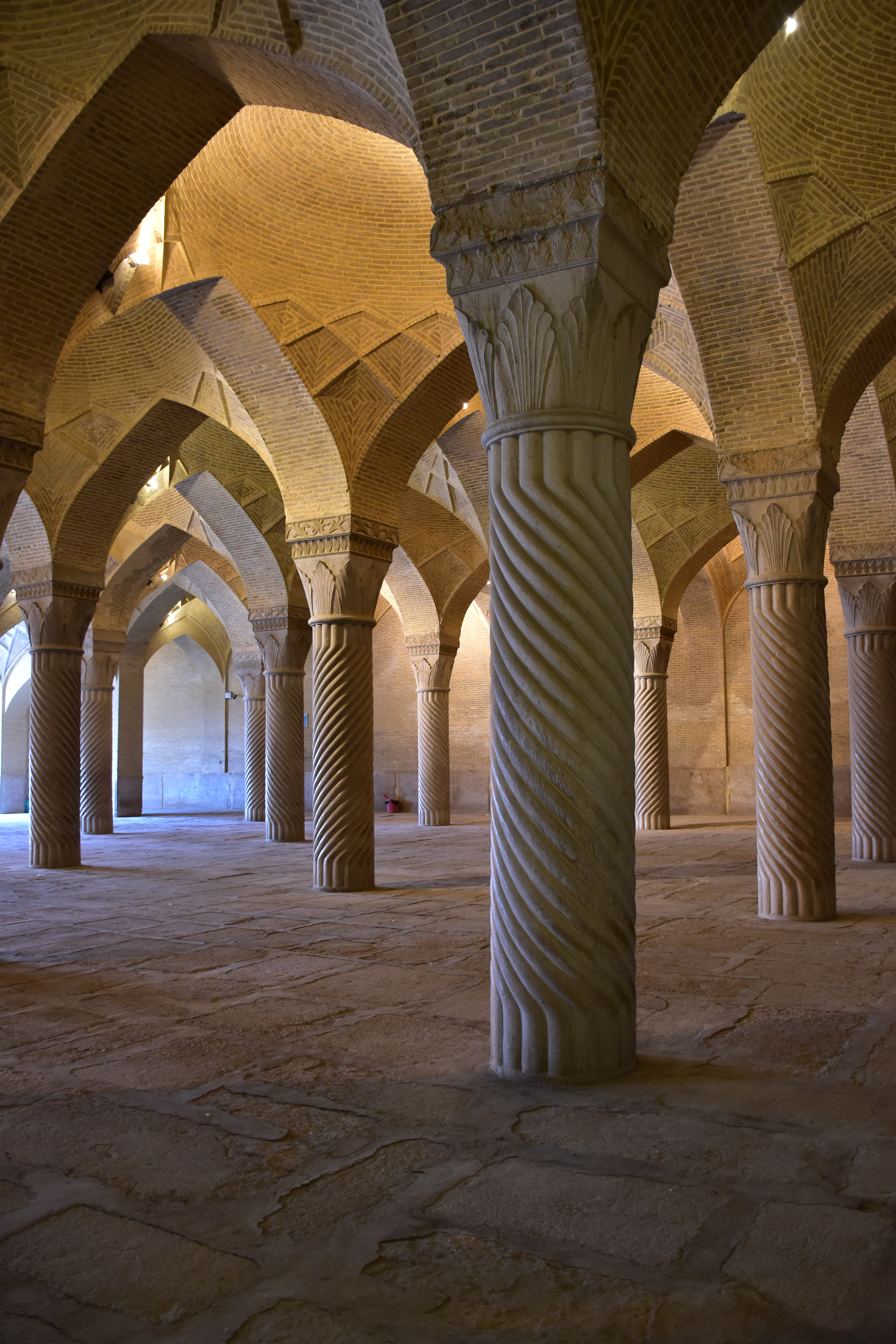
Shabestan pillars

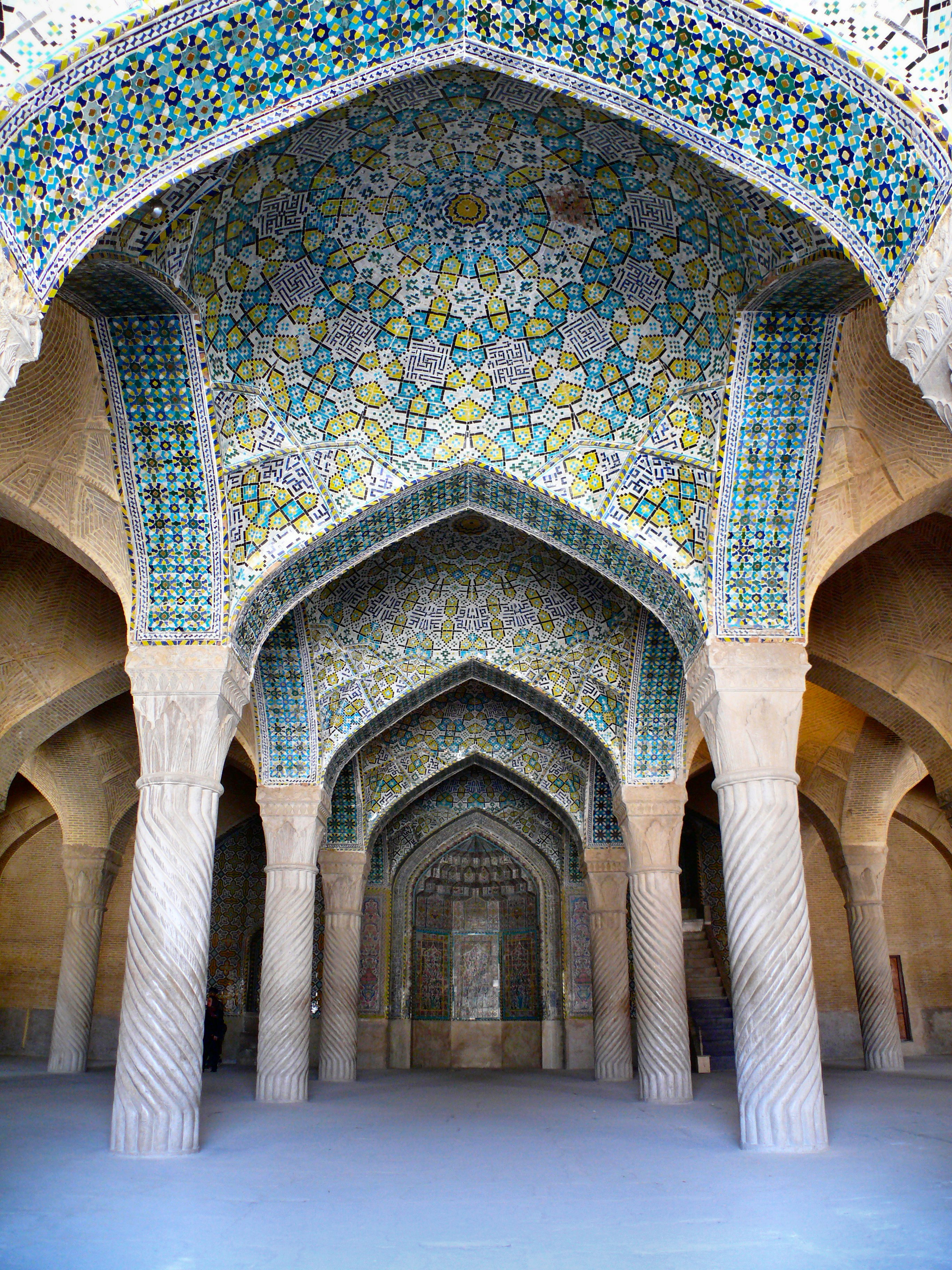
Shabestan ceiling tile work

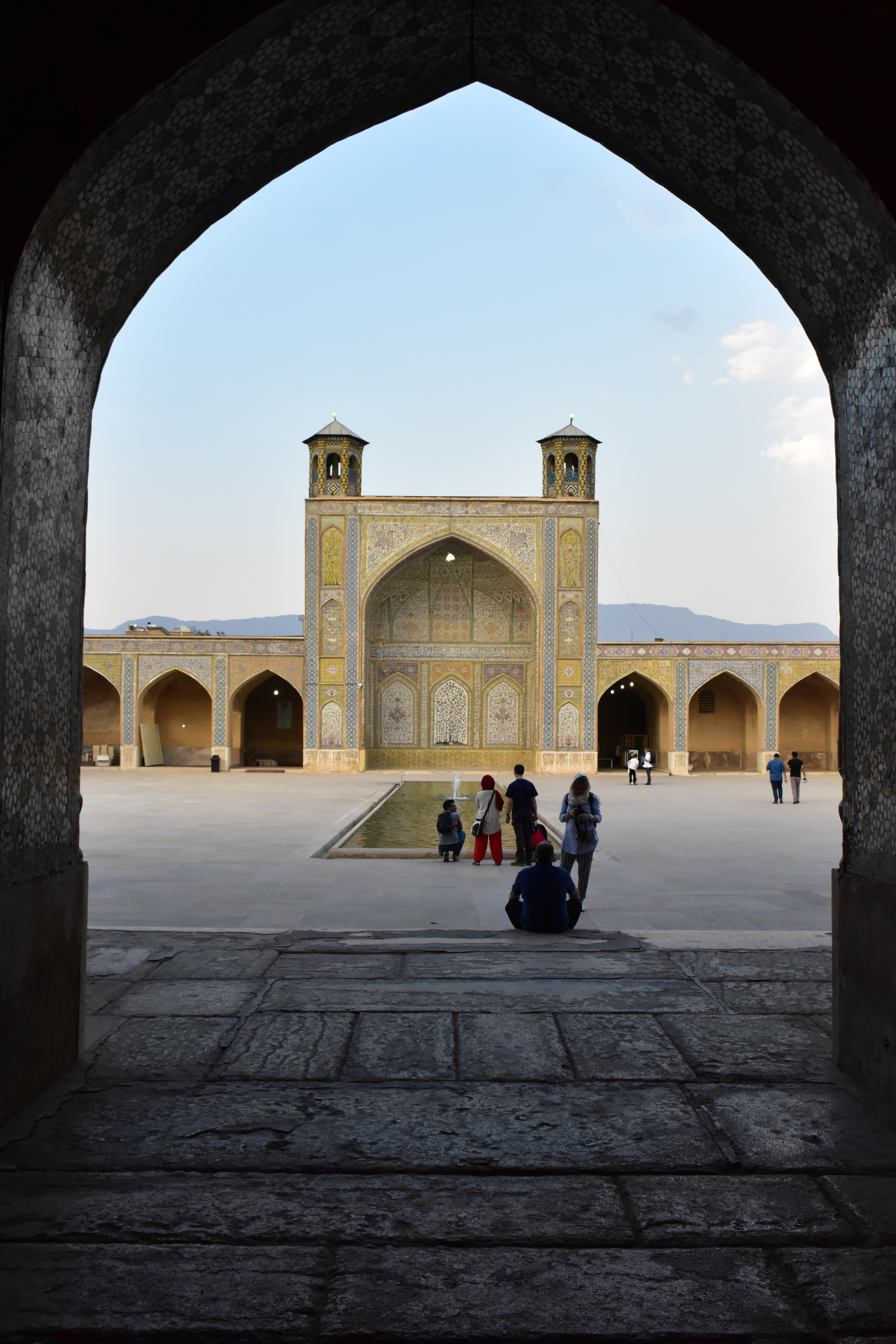
View of northern Iwan from prayer hall

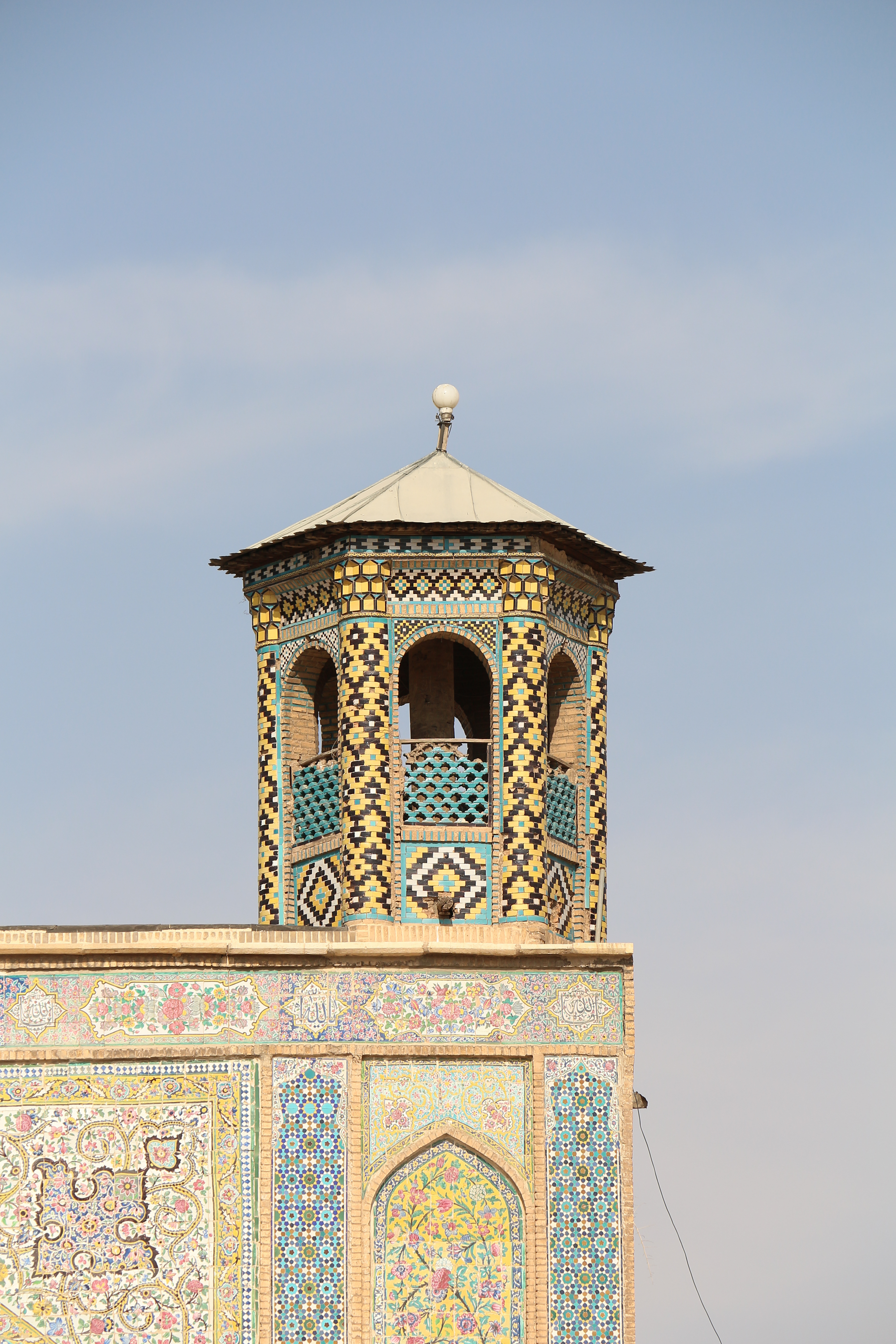
One of the minarets

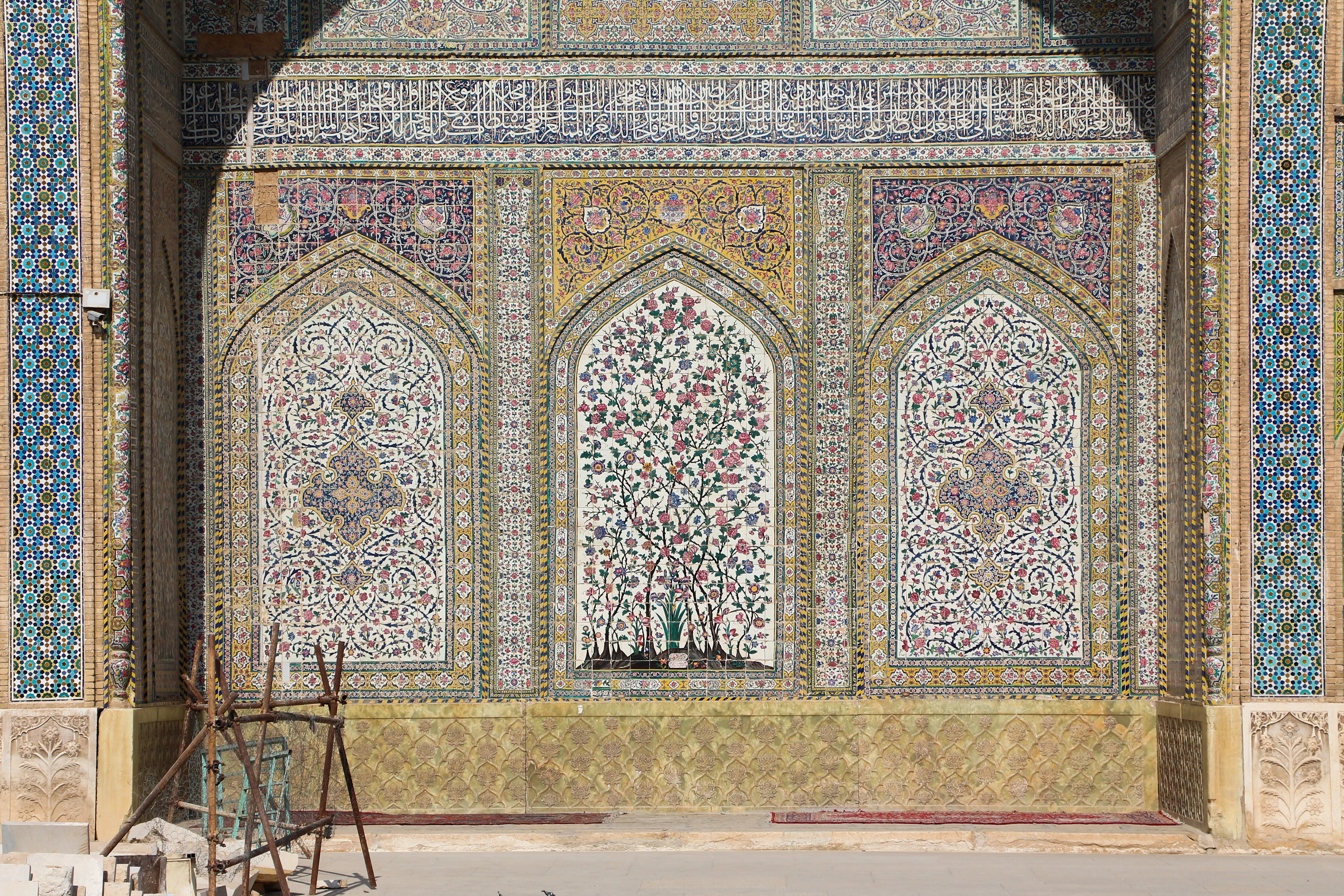
Details of the northern Iwan

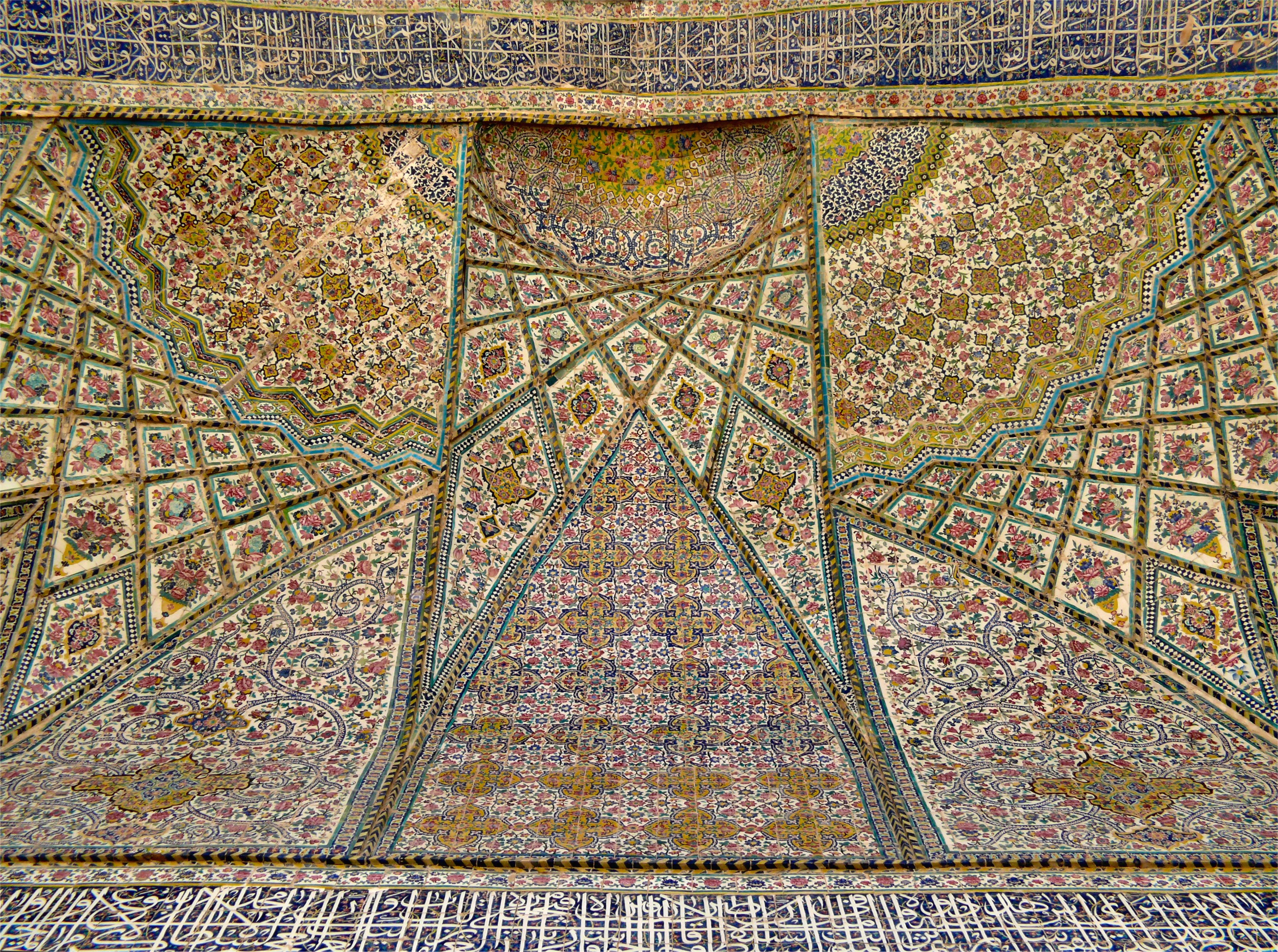
Ceiling of the northern Iwan

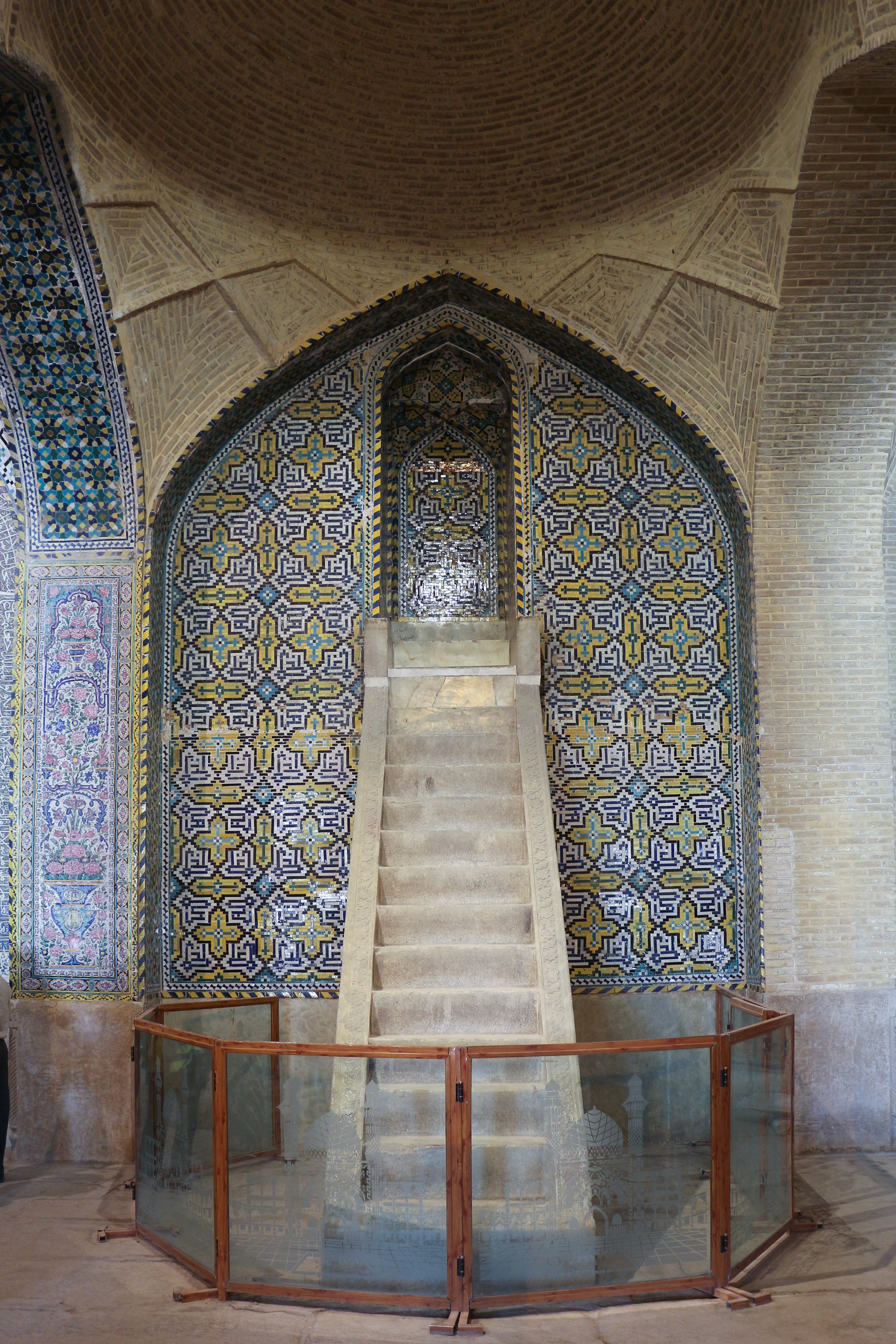
Flight of steps leading to the minbar

== See also ==
- Shia Islam in Iran
- List of mosques in Iran
