= Siege of Kerman =

Qajar siege the capital of the Zand Dynasty

- Part of Qajar-Zand Wars
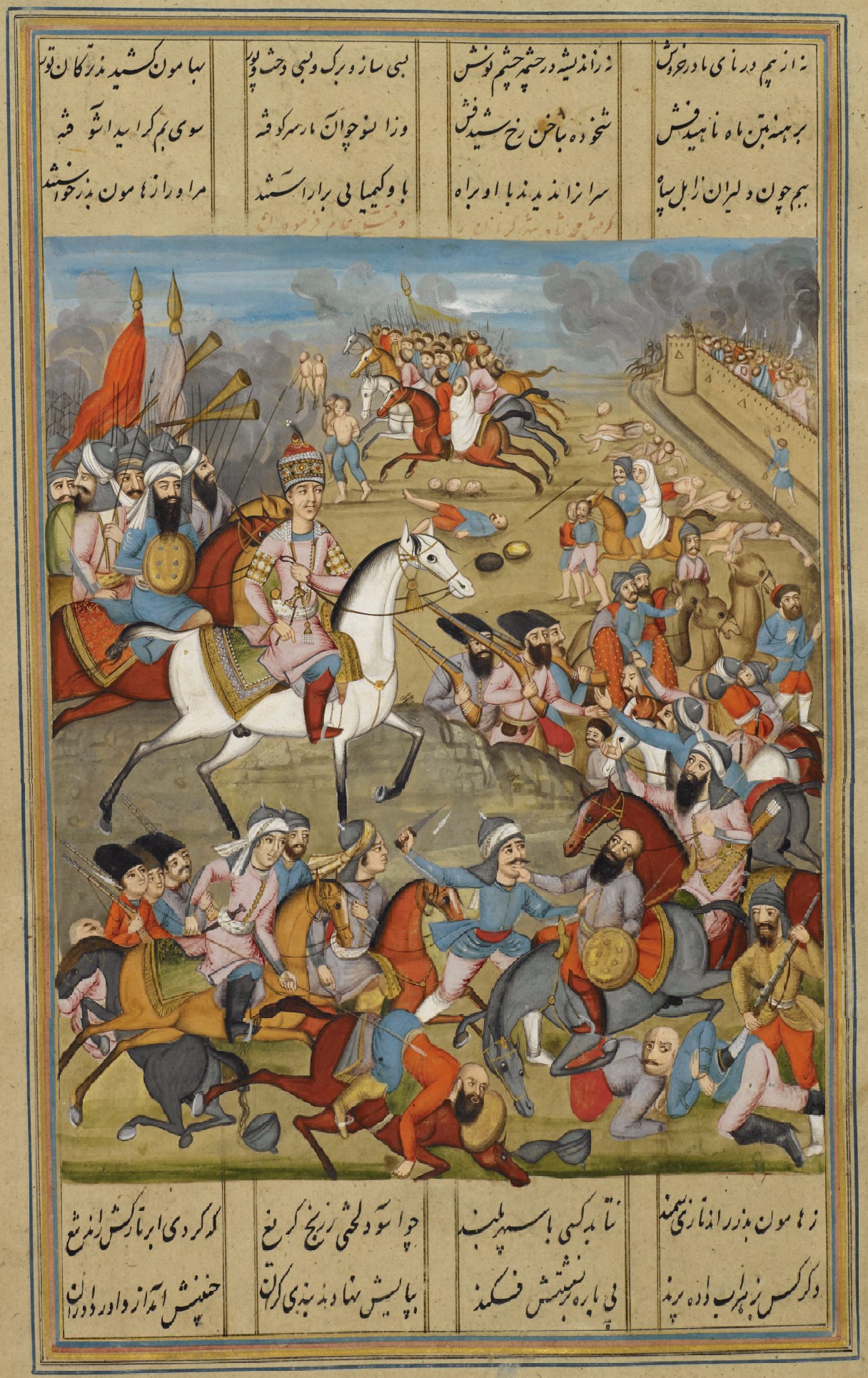
- Capture and Sack of Kerman by Agha Mohammad Khan Qajar
Date	14 May 1794 - 24 October 1794
Location	Kerman, Zand Iran 30°17′N 57°05′E
Result	Qajar victory • Fall of the Zand dynasty
Territorial changes	Capture of Kerman by the Qajars

Belligerents
Zand Iran	Qajar Iran

Commanders and leaders
Lotf Ali Khan	Agha Mohammad Khan

The siege of Kerman (1794) was the capture of the city of Kerman by the Qajar forces led by Agha Mohammad Khan Qajar against Zand forces led by Lotf Ali Khan (the last Khan of the Zand dynasty) which resulted in a decisive Qajar victory. After the siege, tens of thousands of its inhabitants were killed, blinded or taken into slavery; it took the city decades to recover.

== The siege ==
The Afghan chiefs of Bam invited Lotf Ali Khan to return and expel the Qajar yoke. With their help, Lotf Ali Khan returned to Kerman and captured the city on 30 March. Agha Mohammad Khan Qajar quickly heard of this and marched towards Kerman on May 14. The siege lasted four months and took a toll on Kerman's population. The city fell on 24 October, and Lotf Ali Khan quickly fled to Bam. However, the chief of Bam gave Lotf Ali Khan to the Qajars and ordered Lotf Ali Khan to be killed. The last of the Zand rulers was finally delivered to Agha Mohammad Khan Qajar, who had long waited to exact revenge on his arch-rival. "The page of history would be stained by a recital of the indignities offered to the royal captive..." It is reported that Lotf Ali Khan was blinded. Lotf Ali Khan was imprisoned and tortured in Tehran before being choked to death in the late of 1794.

== Aftermath ==
Agha Mohammad Khan exacted a brutal revenge on the people of Kerman for harboring his enemy. All the male inhabitants were killed or blinded, and a pile was made out of 20,000 detached eyeballs and poured in front of the victorious Qajar leader. The women and children were sold into slavery, and the city was destroyed over ninety days. One of the factors in the formation of this event was the incitement of Agha Mohammad Khan by Lotf Ali Khan Zand and his entourage. Among these provocations were the mockery of the Qajar king and the burning of his grudge more and more. Every evening, the people and women of Kermani recited poems in mockery of Agha Mohammad Khan from the towers attached to the gate, mocking his nobility. Also, Lotf Ali Khan's act of minting a coin in his own name caused Agha Mohammad Khan, who was known as insane in the court of Karim Khan Zand, to cut off the eyes of Lotf Ali Khan's seven-year-old son named "Fathullah" with his hands and behead him to win.

== See also ==
- Agha Mohammad Khan Qajar
- Qajar dynasty
- Lotf Ali Khan
- Zand dynasty
- Kerman
