= Golestaneh, Kurdistan =

Golestaneh گلستانه
- Village
- Location within Iran
- Coordinates: 35°53′38″N 47°22′59″E
- Country: Iran
- Province: Kurdistan
- County: Bijar
- Bakhsh: Central
- Rural District: Howmeh

Population (2006)
  - Total: 31
- Time zone: UTC+3:30 (IRST)
  - Summer (DST): UTC+4:30 (IRDT)

Golestaneh (Persian: گلستانه, also Romanized as Golestāneh; also known as Gulistāneh) is a village in Howmeh Rural District, in the Central District of Bijar County, Kurdistan Province, Iran. At the 2006 census, its population was 31, in 8 families. The village is populated by Kurds.
