= Vakil ol-Ra'aya =

Iranian title

Vakil ol-Ra'aya (Persian: وکیل‌الرعایا, lit. 'Deputy of the People') is a popular title best known for being adopted by the Zand ruler Karim Khan Zand (r. 1751–1779) at Shiraz in 1765.

The concept of the Vakil ol-Ra'aya may have been derived from the driyōšān-jādaggōv ud dādvar ("advocate-judge of the poor") office of the pre-Islamic Sasanian Empire (224–651). The title first appears in two administrative documents written in Safavid Iran, being part of the office of the kalantar (major) of Isfahan, the capital of the country. After that, the Vakil ol-Ra'aya became an autonomous office in its own right, being used in many provincial centers of Iran until the collapse of Qajar Iran (1789–1925).

== See also ==
- Rayah

== Sources ==
- Amanat, Abbas (2017). Iran: A Modern History. Yale University Press. ISBN 978-0300112542.
- Perry, John R. (1979). Karim Khan Zand: A History of Iran, 1747–1779. University of Chicago Press. ISBN 978-0226660981.
- Perry, John (2009). "Wakil-al-Raʿāyā". Encyclopaedia Iranica.
