= Hassan Golestaneh =

Iranian bodybuilder

Hassan Golestaneh حسن گلستانه
- ♂ professional bodybuilder

Personal info
- Born: Tehran, Iran

Best statistics
- Height: 6 ft 2 in (190 cm)

Professional (Pro) career
- Best win: 2016 - 2017
- Active: 1995 - to present
Medal record
Gold medal – first place	2016 WFF IRELAND
Gold medal – first place	2016 WFF World Championship
Gold medal – first place	2017 America Fitness World Gold Medal

Hassan Golestaneh (Persian: حسن گلستانه), born 21 March 1983, is a world champion and bodybuilding coach and the first world medalist in the field of fitness from Iran. He is considered the founder of fitness and bodybuilding in Iran.

== Early life and amateur career ==
Golestaneh was born in Tehran, Iran in 1983. He is the son of Enayatollah Golestaneh, the father of incident writing in Iranian newspapers, and a descendant of Seyyed Ali Akbar Golestaneh.

He became interested in football when he was ten years old. He trained professionally under Mohammad Panjali and Nasser Hejazi. He started bodybuilding at the age of fourteen. When he was nineteen, he retired from football after an accident left his ankle injured. He pursued jujitsu for seven years and won several medals.

== Career ==
From 2009 to 2015, Golestaneh coached the Iranian team and took it to fitness competitions in several countries. As a result, he received the 2015 Best Coach Award.

In 2016, he decided to pursue fitness professionally because of his physique. He participated in physical fitness competitions, becoming a worldwide runner-up and the first Iranian fitness medalist. After this success, Iranian newspapers called him a history-maker for Iranian fitness.

After a travel ban that denied Iranians entry to the United States, Golestaneh was the first Iranian athlete to compete there and a top ten Arnold Classic model in 2017. Also in 2017, he won a gold medal at the World Fitness Championships in the United States.

Golestaneh became a fitness and bodybuilding championship referee, the first ever in Iran. He earned the rank of international professional referee from World Referees Committee for the UAE World Championships.

He was selected as Mr. Fitness Iran.

== Professional affiliations ==
- Official and exclusive representative of the International Fitness Federation in Iran and Armenia
- President of the Fitness Association of the Deaf Federation of Iran
- Chairman of Shemiranat and Lavasanat Fitness Committee of Iran
- Secretary of the Sports Working Group of the Iranian Entrepreneurs Association
- Senior Advisor to the Athletes' House (President of Iran)
- Official member of the European Fitness Association
- Chairman of Shemiranat Cross Training Committee

== Advocacy ==
In an interview with the Iranian newspaper, Yektapress, Golestaneh spoke about the restrictions on Iranian women due to the Islamic Republic, noting that the sport of fitness places no restrictions on Iranian women.

Golestaneh gave a speech to the Islamic Council that was attended by Iranian Parliament members, the head of the physical fitness committee of the parliament, and Afshin Moulai who is the chairman of the Iranian Federation of Public Sports.
