= Abol-Hasan Golestaneh =

- Born: Late 18th century Isfahan, Iran
- Occupations: Historian, Government Official

Academic work
- Era: Late 18th century
- Discipline: History
- Notable works: Mojamal al-Tawarikh

Abol-Hasan Golestaneh (fl. late 18th-century) was an Iranian government official from Isfahan, who wrote the historical chronicle of Mojamal al-Tawarikh in 1780. It was an important source for the events that followed after the death of the Iranian ruler Nader Shah (r. 1736–1747), including the establishment of the Durrani Empire by the Afghan ruler Ahmad Shah Durrani (r. 1747–1773), as well as the political affairs in western Iran between 1747 and 1782.

== Sources ==
- Amanat, Abbas (2018). The Layered Heart: Essays on Persian Poetry. Mage Publishers. ISBN 978-1933823973.
- Tucker, Ernest (2009). "Abū l-Ḥasan Gulistāna". In Madelung, Wilferd; Daftary, Farhad (eds.). Encyclopaedia Islamica Online. Brill Online. ISSN 1875-9831.
