= Vakil Bazaar =

Coordinates: 29°36′53.93″N 52°32′48.47″E

- بازارِ وَکیل
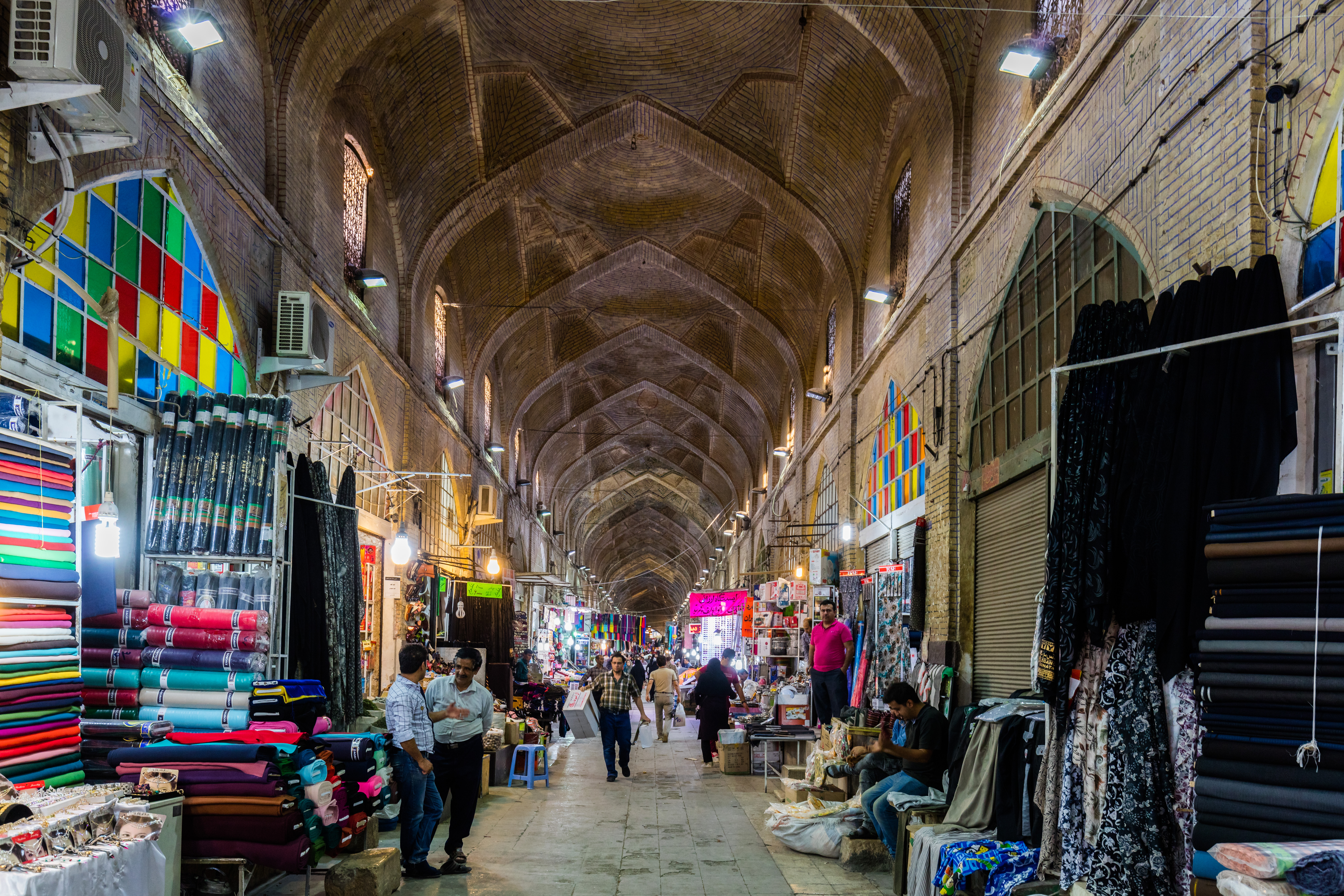
- Interactive map of the Vakil Bazaar area

General information
- Architectural style: Persian
- Location: Shiraz, Iran
- Construction started: mid 1760s
- Completed: late 1760s

Technical details
- Structural system: Bazaar (Welfare)
- Size: 3,000 m2 (presumed)

Design and construction
- Architect: Karim Khan Zand
- Engineer: A team of engineers all from Zand territories

Vakil Bazaar (Persian: بازار وکیل) is a bazaar in central Shiraz, Iran.

== See also ==
- Iranian architecture
- Arabber
- Bazaar
- Bazaari
- Market (place)
- Peddler
- Retail
- Street vendor
- Street food

== Gallery ==
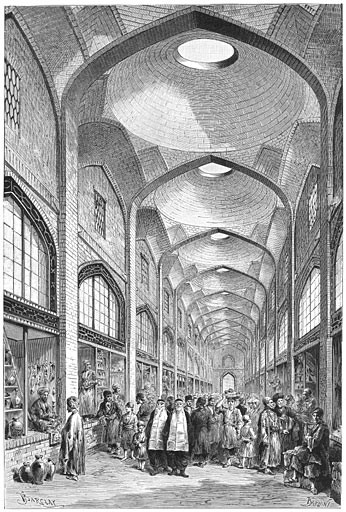
Bazaar of Shiraz as seen by Jane Dieulafoy in 1881.

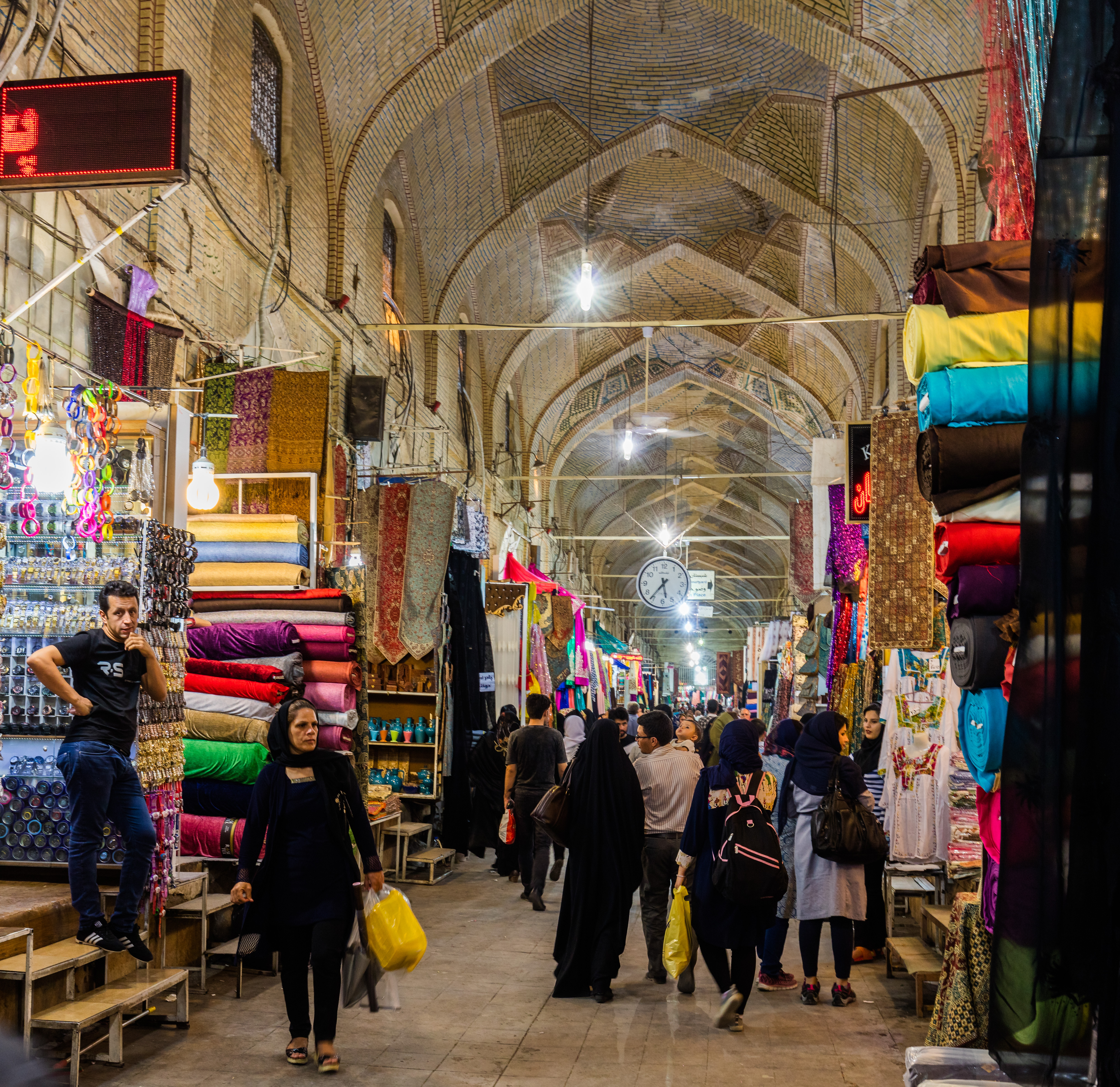
The Vakil Bazaar of Shiraz bustling with shoppers.

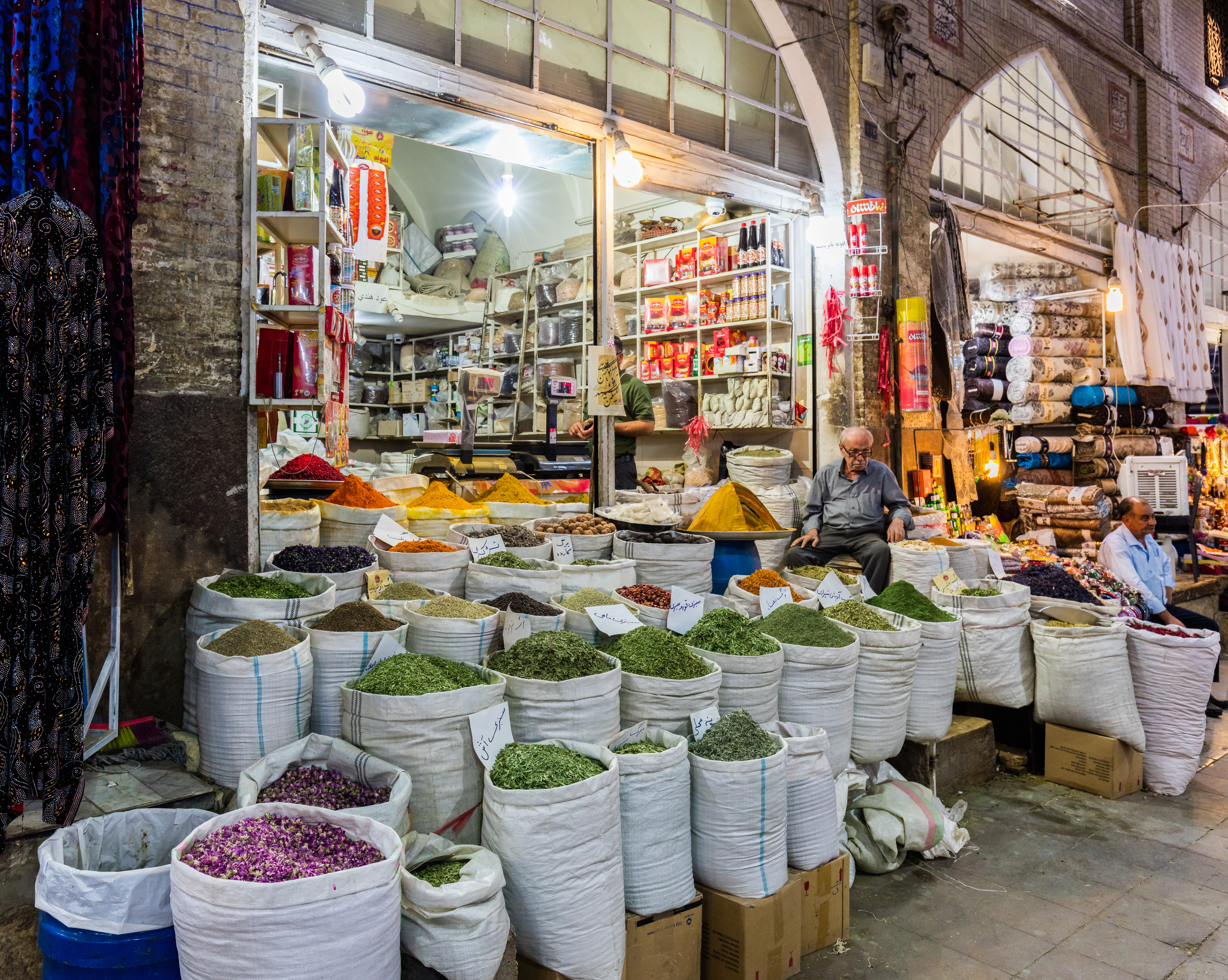
Spice shops.

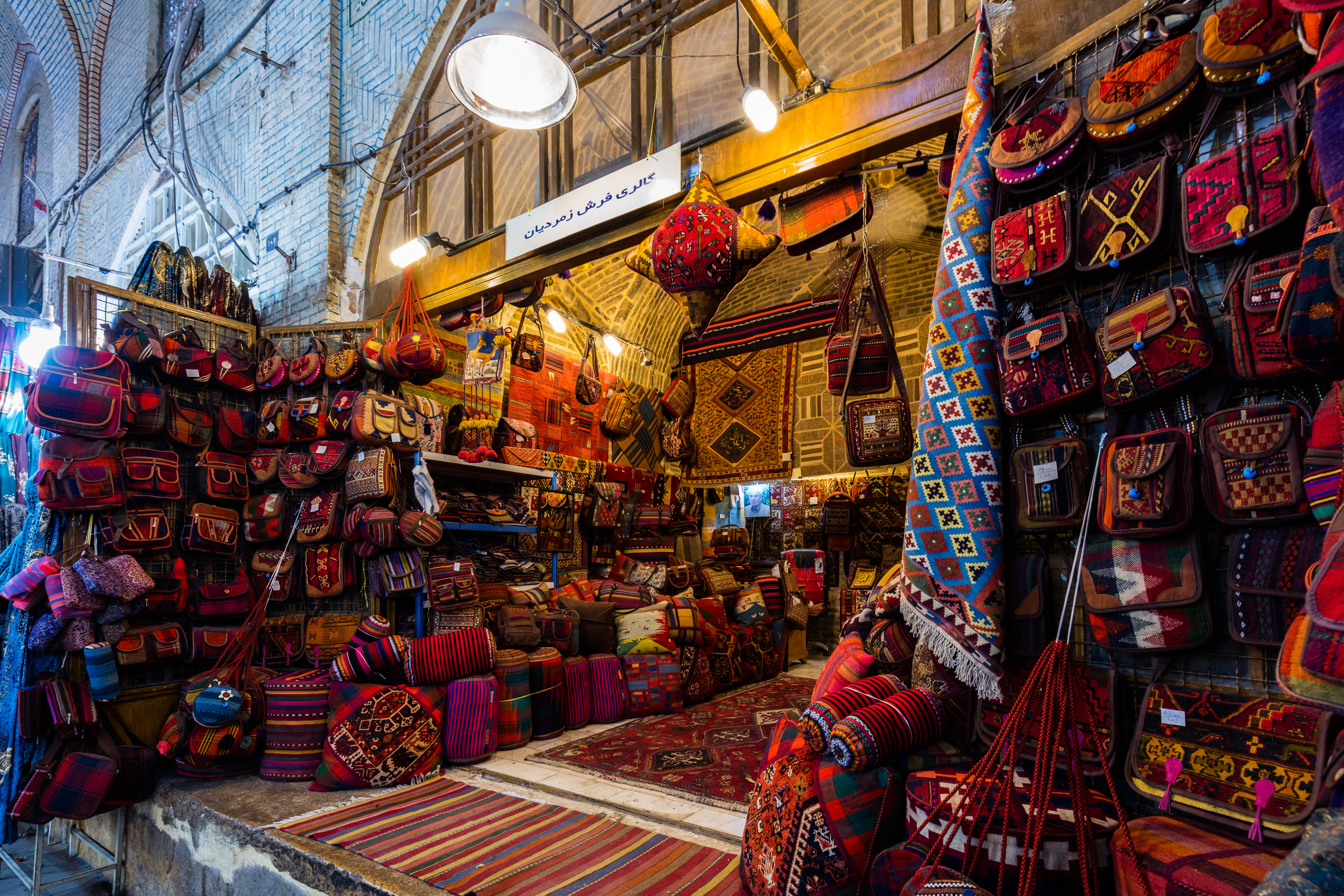
Textiles.

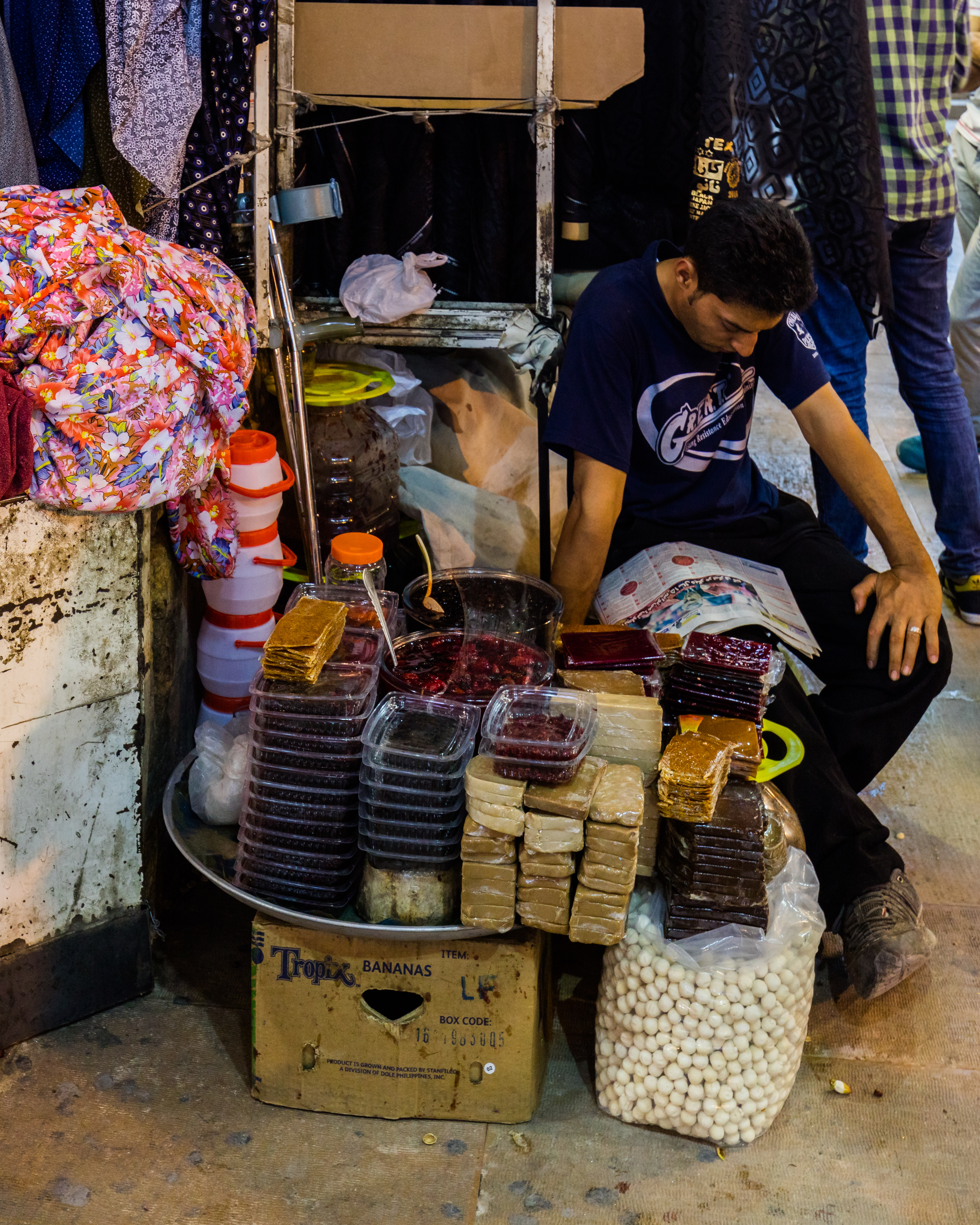
Sweets seller.
