= Battle of Shahrezur =

1776 battle

- Part of Ottoman–Persian War (1776–1779)
- Plain of Shahrizor
Date	1777
Location	Shahrizor, Iran 35.45°N 45.45°E
Result	Zand victory

Belligerents
Zand Iran	Pashalik of Iraq

Commanders and leaders
'Ali Morad Khan 'Zulfaqar Khan Zand 'Kalb Ali Khan	Hasan Pasha

Strength
Unknown	12,000+

The Battle of Shahrezur was a pivotal engagement fought in 1777 between the Ottoman mamluks of Iraq and the Zand dynasty of Iran. It ended in a Zand victory and narrowly reversed them from total defeat in the Kurdistan theatre of the broader Ottoman–Persian War of 1776–1779.

== Prelude ==
The battle occurred against the backdrop of multiple, successive Ottoman victories at Chamchamal, Baneh, and Sanandaj, which humiliated the Zand court and inflicted heavy pressure on that specific frontier, even when the focal point of the war was centered in Basra, which fell nearly simultaneously to this point. Khosrow Khan Bozorgi, the chief of Ardalan who was defeated at the Battle of Sanandaj and abandoned when the main Zand force withdrew, appealed to Karim Khan Zand to salvage the situation, so a counteroffensive with 3 armies was drafted under the respective commands of 'Ali Morad Khan, 'Zulfaqar Khan, and 'Kalb Ali Khan Zand.

The Ottomans, led by Hasan Pasha, lead a force of 12,000 consisting of provincial soldiers and local levies, but further troops were impossible to gain as the al-Jalili family in Mosul refused to support the Ottoman war effort.

== Battle ==
Approximately 3-4 months after Khosrow's request for help, the army completed its preparations and converged on the plain of Shahrezur after linking up in Sanandaj, where they decisively defeated the Ottoman host and drove them into Iraq, pursuing them deep and plundering toward Baghdad, facilitating further destructive Zand forays in the vicinities of both Qara Chowalan and Baghdad from there on.

== Aftermath ==
'Abdollah Pasha, the Ottoman commander who was defeated by the Zands at the Battle of Khanaqin and present in Baghdad, attempted to negotiate a peace settlements with the Persians by sending an embassy under Mohammad Beg Shavi-zada. The Zands reciprocated with Haydar Khan Zangana, but despite negotiations throughout Autumn 1777, no decisive deal was reached, and the region of Kurdistan remained turbulent and frequently plundered until the war effectively ended in 1779.
