= Guarded Domains of Iran =

Official name of Iran from 16th to 20th century

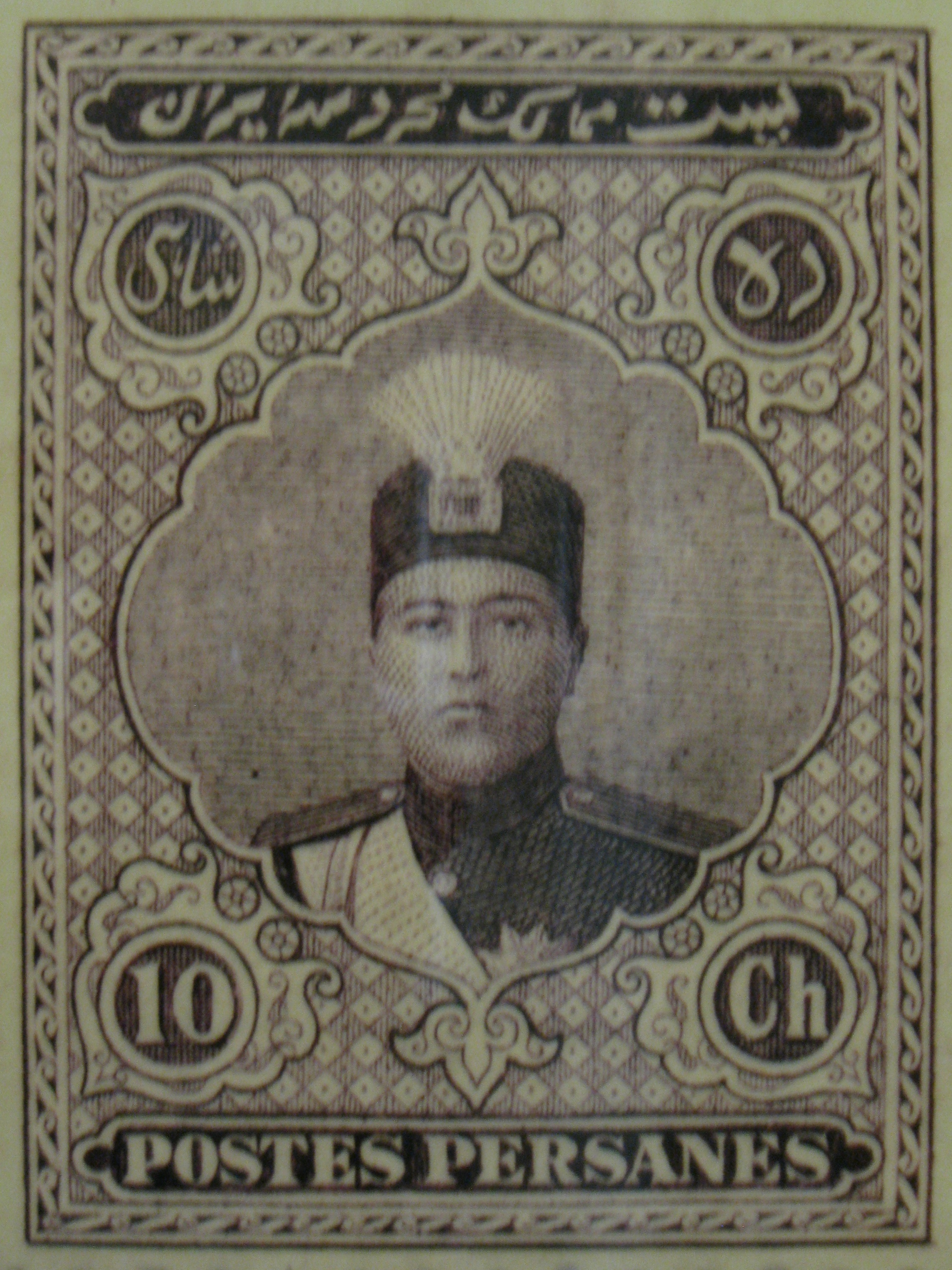
Stamp of Ahmad Shah Qajar. The term "the Guarded Domains of Iran" is visible on the top of the stamp

The Guarded Domains of Iran (Persian: ممالک محروسهٔ ایران, Mamâlek-e Mahruse-ye Irân), or simply the Domains of Iran (ممالک ایران, Mamâlek-e Irân) and the Guarded Domains (ممالک محروسه, Mamâlek-e Mahruse), was the common and official name of Iran from the Safavid era until the early 20th century.

The idea of the "Guarded Domains" was formed by a feeling of territorial and political uniformity in a society with shared cultural elements such as the Persian language, monarchy, and Shia Islam. The concept had previously been used in the form of Eranshahr, the official name of the Sasanian Empire (224–651), which promoted the concept of Iran as a protected political unit ruled by the state and with a distinct geographical region.

Iranian territorial losses during the Qajar era in the 19th century led to a new understanding of the Guarded Domains and the extent of the Iranian lands. There were limitations on the authority that the Guarded Domains had over Greater Iran; they lost territories such as the Caucasian provinces and Herat.

== Name ==
The name "Iran" has denoted both the homeland of the Iranian people and the kingdom of Iranian rulers. The Iranian people had a connection to the land that they tied to the concept of Iran's territory. In pre-modern times, the dynastic realm and the region were both referred to by the Persian term keshvar ("country"). The Arabic word mamlakat, which comes from the root malaka and means "to own or to rule," was the most widely used translation of keshvar. Persian historiography frequently used mamlakat to refer to clearly defined kingdoms or royal domains, as well as the provinces that made them up. This included the Guarded Domains of Iran (Mamâlek-e Mahruse-ye Irân). Since the Safavid era (1501–1736), other variants were also in use, such as mamalek-e mahruse-ye khosrovani ("the Royal Guarded Domains") and mamalek-e mahruse-ye homayun ("the Imperial Guarded Domains"). Its shortened variant was mamalek-e Iran ("Domains of Iran"), most commonly used in writings from the Qajar era (1789–1925).

== History ==
=== Early history ===
Due to its location and ecosystem, as well as the popularity of high culture and the Persian language, Iran was able to maintain its cultural identity during the period between the Islamic invasion and the establishment of the Safavid state. The idea of the "Guarded Domains" was formed by a feeling of territorial and political uniformity in a society with shared cultural elements such as the Persian language, monarchy, and Shia Islam. The concept presumably started to form under the Mongol Ilkhanate in the late 13th-century, a period in which regional actions, trade, written culture, and partly Shia Islam, contributed to the establishment of the early modern Persianate world.

The name "Guarded Domains of Iran" alluded to the decentralised administration as well as cultural and ethnic diversity of the country. According to the Iranologist Abbas Amanat, "in this notion of Iran, one may argue, there was a realistic recognition not only of its complexity but also of the inherent necessity for the central state." The concept had previously been used in the form of Eranshahr, the official name of Iran under the Sasanian Empire (224–651), which promoted the concept of Iran as a protected political unit ruled by the state and with a distinct geographical region. The Persian term shahr, commonly used to describe a walled city, etymologically refers to a "territory governed by the shah". In essence, shahr embodied the centralized state as it developed within the urban environment, analogous to the Greek idea of the polis.

=== Safavid era ===
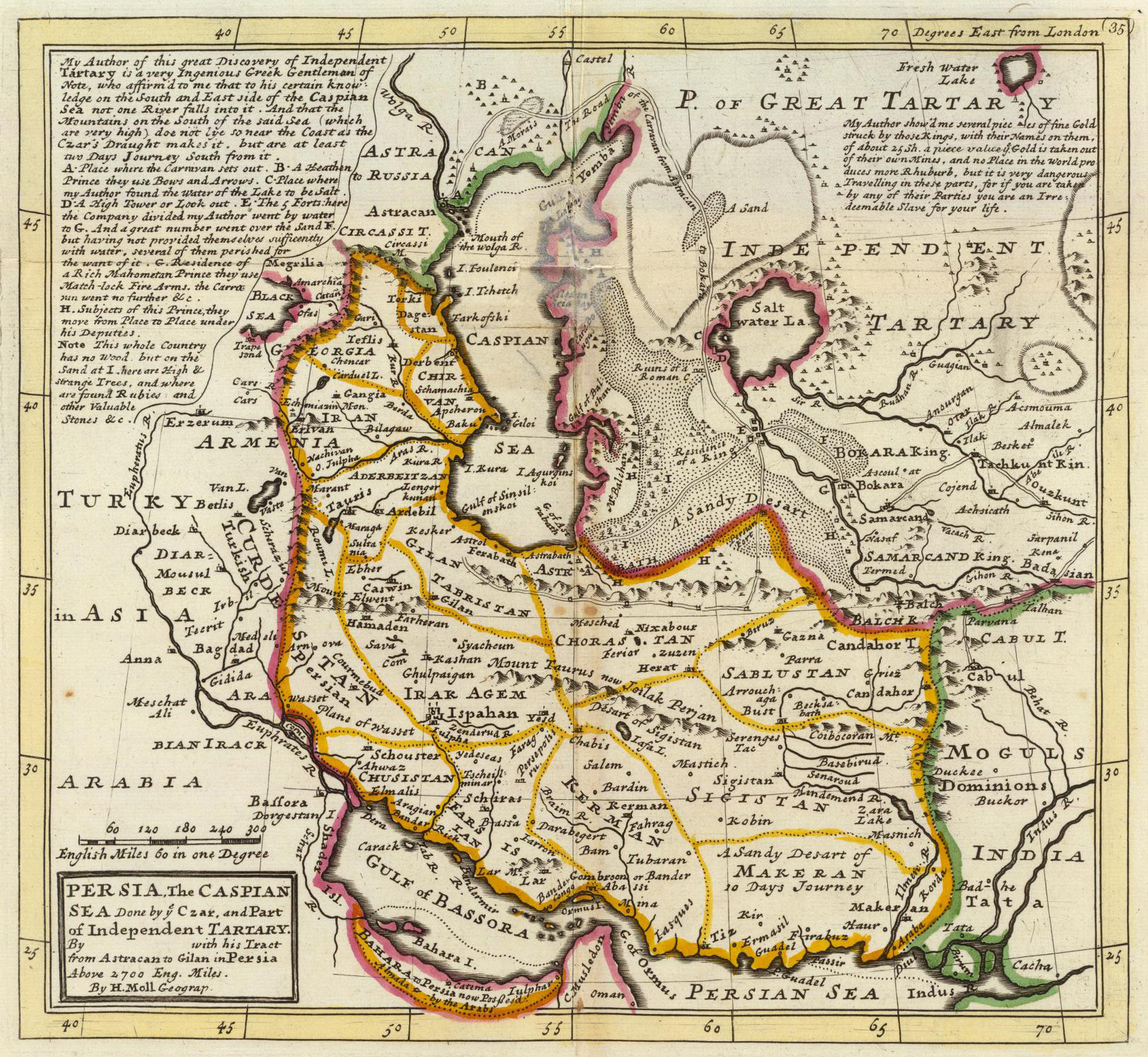
Historical map of Safavid Iran and its divisions, published in 1736

Despite military and theological assaults, the Safavid order survived as a beleaguered enclave in the Azerbaijan region and eastern Anatolia from the mid-14th century. After coming to power in Iran, the movement instilled a new Shia identity in its subjects and established an imperial state that would form part of the country's political sovereignty. Despite violence caused by Safavid shah Ismail I (r. 1501–1524) and his successors, the dynasty managed to unify the diverse local dynasties, ethnicities, and cultures that had divided Iran since the time of the Turco-Mongol ruler Timur (r. 1370–1405) a century earlier. The Safavids thus revitalized the Guarded Domains of Iran, which starting from them would serve as the common and official name of Iran until the early 20th century.

Safavid annals began to utilise references to the "Guarded Domains of Iran" more frequently toward the end of Abbas the Great's rule as a substitute for the "Sublime Safavid State" (Dowlat-e 'Alliyeh-e Safavieh). By this period, Safavid Iran had developed a sense of confidence and security as a result of driving out the Portuguese, fending off the Uzbeks, and reclaiming Safavid land from the Ottomans. The majority of European reports of Iran in the 17th-century attest to a new era of prosperity made possible by an expanded domestic and international communication network, a rising urban population, a complex understanding of relaxation, and a developing Shia intellectual identity.

=== Qajar era ===
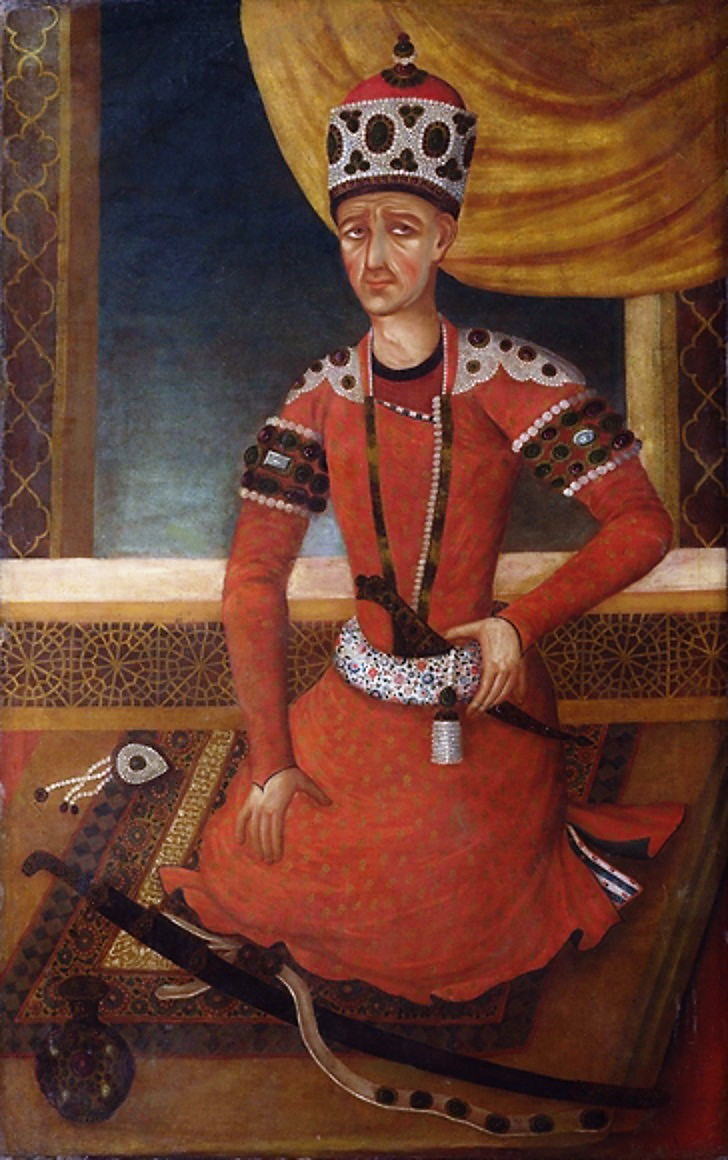
Portrait of Agha Mohammad Khan Qajar, dated 1820

Qajar assertions of having restored an imperial system of governance relied on controlling the Guarded Domains. Under the Qajars, there were no major changes to land practices, unlike in other historical contexts when governing the land may have led to changes in land tenure or administration or in attempts to alter the natural environment. Instead, they found a purpose in their political authority through their rule of the land. In order to maintain their status as the defenders and distributors of land rights, the Qajar shahs reused the customs and structures of past dynasties.

The Qajar ruler Agha Mohammad Khan Qajar dedicated the majority of his political career to establish Qajar sovereignty over the lands that were once ruled by the Safavids. His time and effort were focused on this goal for about twenty years, from the time he managed to escape Zand captivity in Shiraz in 1779 to the time he crowned himself shah in 1796. After departing Shiraz, Agha Mohammad Khan spent years strengthening authority in northern Iran. After completing this by 1785, he focused on seizing central and southern Iran. By 1794, he had conquered Kerman and Fars and killed his biggest rival, the Zand ruler Lotf Ali Khan Zand (r. 1789–1794).

In 1796, Agha Mohammad Khan conquered the majority of Khorasan and Georgia, thus gaining control over all the former Safavid lands. With his goal complete, Agha Mohammad Khan officially declared himself shah. According to the Iranian historian Assef Ashraf, "this protracted process of conquest raises various questions, including just how secure Agha Muhammad Khan's – and by extension Qajar – control over the vast regions of Iran was, as well as when, precisely, the Qajar period of rule 'began'." It is possible that he thought the conquering the former Safavid territory was essential to his legitimacy because he did not declare himself shah until after he had done so. In the contemporary historical chronicle Rostam al-Tavarikh each year of Agha Mohammad Khan's reign is summarised in a few words, which lists the regions and territories he conquered.

The term Guarded Domains developed a new political meaning during the Russo-Persian Wars in the early 19th century, when it was adopted as a practical means of demanding the defense of Iranian territory against foreign invasion. In Tabriz, a book compiled from a fatwa on jihad, authored by two distinguished Shia jurists from Iraq, includes an introduction where the Qajar minister and statesman Abol-Qasem Qa'em-Maqam emphasised the importance of jihad. He argued that it was a collective religious duty to counter the "disorder brought by the Russian nation within the Guarded Domain".

In order to create prose that resembled a political slogan and acted as an encouragement to defend Iran, Abol-Qasem Qa'em-Maqam experimented with words that rhymed with mahrus. The threat posed by Russia (Rus) to the Qajar domains was considered ominous (manhus). This threatened the territorial integrity of the Qajars and their honor (namus). The loss of the Caucasian provinces during the two wars with Russia (1804–1813 and 1826–1828) damaged the Qajar's reputation as the guardian of the Guarded Domains of Iran.

Fath-Ali Shah Qajar (r. 1797–1834) established a semi-autonomous system of princely governments under the authority of the central state. This feature, also used in the Seljuk and Safavid eras, gave new meaning to the concept of the Guarded Domains. Senior princes primarily served as provincial governors at Tabriz, Shiraz, Kermanshah, Isfahan, and Mashhad, or as high-ranking officials in the growing Qajar court and army. Smaller administrations were assigned to younger princes.

After being defeated by Britain, Iran signed the Treaty of Paris in 1857, in which they agreed to relinquish all territorial claims to Herat or any other area within Afghanistan. Iranian territorial losses under the Qajars in the 19th century led to a new understanding of the Guarded Domains and the extent of the Iranian lands. There were limitations on the authority that the Guarded Domains had over Greater Iran, such as the Caucasian provinces and Herat. Iran's final borders were determined by its conflicts with Russia, Britain and the Ottoman Empire.

The recapture of Khuzestan from the Emirate of Muhammara in November 1924 by the Iranian general Reza Khan marked the end of the concept of the "Guarded Domains of Iran", being replaced by the more centralized concept of the "Sublime State of Iran." The following year, the weakened Qajar dynasty was abolished and replaced by the Pahlavi dynasty of Reza Khan, who became known as Reza Shah.

== Geography ==
Prior to the modern era, Iran's borders remained unchanged throughout the course of history. The definition of the Guarded Domains' borders was almost identical to that of Eranshahr in the Sasanian-era text Letter of Tansar, as well as the description by the 14th-century geographer Hamdallah Mustawfi in his Nuzhat al-Qulub. (Note: Mustawfi describes the borders of Iran extending from the Indus River to Khwarazm and Transoxiana in the east to Byzantium and Syria in the west, corresponding to the territory of the Sasanian Empire. He defines the provinces of Iran in 20 chapters; Iraq ("Arab Iraq") or the "heart of Iranshahr", Persian Iraq, Arran, Mughan, Shirvan, Georgia, Byzantium, Armenia, Rabi'a, Kurdistan, Khuzestan, Fars, Shabankara, Kirman, Mukran, Hormuz, Nimruz, Khorasan, Mazandaran, Qumis, Tabaristan and Gilan.)

Mohammad Mofid Mostofi Bafghi wrote about the boundaries of the Guarded Domains of Iran in his 1670s geographical compilation, Mokhtasar-e Mofid. He provided a comprehensive list of all the many areas that, in his opinion, comprised Iran's "Guarded Domains." Living in India at the time, one of the reasons he composed his work was to challenge to India's claim to be a great empire. The region he envisioned as Greater Iran encompassed all of Mesopotamia, which had in reality been under Ottoman rule since 1638. He emphasized areas that were important amongst Shia Muslims, particularly Mesopotamia with its major Shia shrines. The Persian Gulf coast, which had been under Safavid rule since the reign of Shah Abbas I, was the last location on his list. Because of its affiliation with the Indian subcontinent and Arab areas, this region was the least successfully administered and the most isolated off from the Iranian heartland.

Mirza Fazlollah Khavari Shirazi, the vaqaye-negar (court chronicler) of Fath-Ali Shah, described the borders of the Guarded Domains in his Tarikh-e Zu'l-Qarneyn.

"Let it be known that the vast kingdom of Iran... stretches from the Caucasus mountains, which are at the furthest limit of Georgia and Daghestan, near Russian lands, to the ends of Kerman, where it meets the Indian Ocean. As the crow flies, the length of this area is three hundred and thirty farsakh, and the width of this realm, from the Oxus River to Baghdad's Tigris River is two hundred and thirteen farsakh.... It [i.e. Iran] has sixteen administrative provinces and regions: one is in the west, which is called Azerbaijan. There are four provinces in the north and along the Caspian Sea, which are Georgia, Shirvan, Gilan and Tabaristan. Two provinces are in the east, which have the Uzbek lands located to their north, and these are named Khorasan and Ghaznin [i.e. Ghazna]. There is one province in the heart of Iranian territory, known as Iraq-i Ajam. Passing through it, there are eight other provinces, some of which border the land of Baghdad, while the others are along with the Basra and Oman seas and the Indian Ocean. These are Kurdistan, Lorestan, Khuzestan, Fars, Kerman, Makran, Zabulistan and Sajastan."

Momtahen al-Dowleh Mirza Mehdi Khan Shaqaqi, writing in the late 19th-century, stated that the Guarded Domains encompassed Ray, Azerbaijan, Khorasan, Sistan, Fars, Larestan, Isfahan, Khuzestan, Kerman, Balochistan, Gilan, Mazandaran, Yazd, Lorestan, Kermanshahan, Qazvin, Kurdistan, Ardalan, and Astarabad.

== Sources ==
- Amanat, Abbas (1997). Pivot of the Universe: Nasir Al-Din Shah Qajar and the Iranian Monarchy, 1831–1896. I.B. Tauris. ISBN 978-1845118280.
- Amanat, Abbas (2017). Iran: A Modern History. Yale University Press. ISBN 978-0300112542.
- Amanat, Abbas (2019). "Remembering the Persianate". In Amanat, Abbas; Ashraf, Assef (eds.). The Persianate World: Rethinking a Shared Sphere. Brill. pp. 15–62. ISBN 978-90-04-38728-7.
- Ashraf, Ahmad; Gnoli, Gherardo (2020). "Iranian Identity". Encyclopaedia Iranica Online. Brill. doi:10.1163/2330-4804_EIRO_COM_11030.
- Ashraf, Assef (2021). "Safavid Nostalgia in Early Qajar Chronicles". In Melville, Charles Melville (ed.). The Contest for Rule in Eighteenth-Century Iran: Idea of Iran Vol. 11. I.B.Tauris. pp. 81–102. ISBN 978-0755645992.
- Ashraf, Assef (2024). Making and Remaking Empire in Early Qajar Iran. Cambridge University Press. ISBN 978-1009361552.
- Behrooz, Maziar (2023). Iran at War: Interactions with the Modern World and the Struggle with Imperial Russia. I.B. Tauris. ISBN 978-0755637379.
- Jackson, Peter (2017). The Mongols and the Islamic World: From Conquest to Conversion. Yale University Press. ISBN 9780300227284. JSTOR j.ctt1n2tvq0. (registration required)
- Kashani-Sabet, Firoozeh (2014). Frontier Fictions: Shaping the Iranian Nation, 1804–1946. Princeton University Press. ISBN 978-1850432708.
- Katouzian, Homa (2007). Iranian History and Politics: The Dialectic of State and Society. Routledge. ISBN 978-0415297547.
- Matthee, Rudi (2009). "Was Safavid Iran an Empire?". Journal of the Economic and Social History of the Orient. 53 (1–2). Brill: 233–265. doi:10.1163/002249910X12573963244449.
- Matthee, Rudi (2011). Persia in Crisis: Safavid Decline and the Fall of Isfahan. I.B.Tauris. ISBN 978-0857731814.
