= Safavid Kurdistan =

Province in western Safavid Iran

Safavid Kurdistan Velāyat-e Kordestān
- 1508–1736
- Status: Province of Safavid Iran
- Capital: Marivan (?–?); Hasanabad (?–1636/37); Sanandaj (1636/37–1736)
- Common languages: Kurdish, Persian
- Government: Province
Succeeded by
Afsharid Iran

The province of Kurdistan (also known as Ardalan; Persian: ولایت کردستان, romanized: Velāyat-e Kordestān) was a western province of Safavid Iran, whose size varied throughout its existence due to political and military developments.

The office of vali (viceroy) of Kurdistan was generally held by the Ardalan dynasty, the leading power amongst the Kurdish confederations.

== Administration ==
Kurdistan was a western province of Safavid Iran, whose size varied throughout its existence due to political and military developments. It was one of the five velayats of the country, being ruled by a vali (viceroy), who was nearly an independent governor. The valis generally belonged to prominent local families, and were officially chosen by the shah (king) as a compromise of regional autonomy. Nevertheless, they ruled in a hereditary manner. In rare occasions a vali was appointed to a velayat he had no connection to. This could possibly cause issues, such as in the 1680s Kurdistan, where a non-Kurdish vali chosen by Shah Soleyman (r. 1666–1694) was chased out by the locals. The position of vali of Kurdistan was held by the Ardalan dynasty, the leading power amongst the Kurdish confederations. Available records suggest that before the 17th-century, the Safavids rarely intervened in the succession of the Ardalan governors. However, they did occasionally support one claimant against another.

== History ==
=== 16th century ===
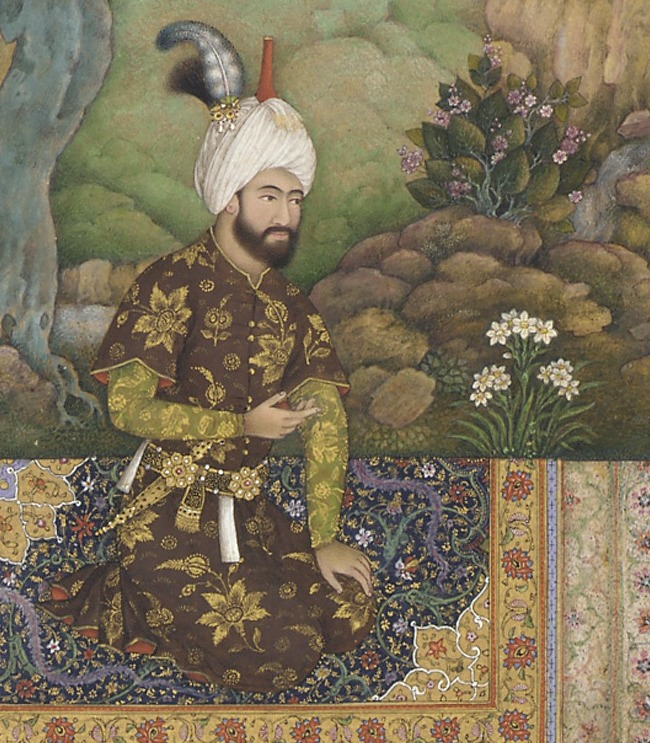
16th-century portrayal of the Safavid ruler Tahmasp I (r. 1524–1576), who made numerous attempts to integrate the Kurds into his kingdom

In 1508, the local rulers of Kurdistan acknowledged the suzerainty of the Safavids. Shah Tahmasp I (r. 1524–1576) made numerous attempts to integrate the Kurds into his kingdom. The offspring of the Kurdish emirs were welcomed into the royal court and educated alongside the Safavid princes. They were anticipated to develop into devoted servants of the shah, being taught a variety of subjects, such as military expertise. Sharafkhan Bidlisi, who was raised at Tahmasp I's court, described his upbringing there;

"The late emperor Shah Tahmasp used to admit sons of his emirs and notables, at an early age, to his private seraglio, arrange for them to be in the intimate company of royal princes, and have them attend on the most honored masters… He encouraged them to learn the Quran, to read judicial decisions, and to be pious and pure, and he inspired them to associate with those who were god-fearing and equipped with the integrity of righteous people… When they reached the age of maturity and discernment, he taught them military skills, archery, polo, equestrianism, the rules for handling arms, and the codes of courtesy and humanity. He also told them to pay some attention to painting."

The modern historian Akihiko Yamaguchi considers Tahmasp I's program to be "nothing less than a hostage policy", but also states that Sharafkhan Bidlisi's description demonstrates that Tahmasp I planned to increase their loyalty to him, and that it significantly strengthened the court's relationship with the local lords. Another important aspect of Tahmasp I's Kurdish policy was the enrollment of young members of Kurdish ruling families into the qurchi (royal guards). A Kurd who had been raised in the court or served as a qurchi was occasionally elevated to become the head of his own tribe. These tribal leaders were anticipated to keep preserve their personal ties with the shah and the royal court due to their court schooling or employment as a qurchi. Nevertheless, during Tahmasp I's rule the Kurds were overlooked in the administration. Prominent positions in the political and military spheres were predominantly allocated to members of the Qizilbash; few Kurdish individuals acquired a rank high enough to be recognized in historical Safavid records and alike. Tahmasp I's goal of ensuring the Kurds loyalty was mainly successful, since only a few Kurdish emirs defected to the Ottoman Empire after the Peace of Amasya, which forbid the Safavids and Ottomans from interfering in each others internal affairs.

Following the death of Tahmasp I in 1576, a power struggle amongst the Qizilbash tribes ensured, shortly followed by an Ottoman invasion, which impelled the Kurdish tribes under Safavid rule to once again switch back and forth between them and the Ottomans. The conflict was resolved through the Treaty of Constantinople in 1590, which led to the relinquishment of the western portion of Iran to the Ottomans. This also included the majority of Kurdistan, which would remain in Ottoman hands for over ten years. From 1577 onwards, Sonqor and Dinavar came under direct Safavid control, and continued to do so even after Zanganeh tribe were made its hereditary governors in 1639.

Kurdistan was amongst the areas affected by the reforms of Shah Abbas I (r. 1588–1629). From now on, as long as the Kurdish emirs remained faithful to Safavids, their hereditary titles would be acknowledged by the shah. Up to the end of the Safavid kingdom, this policy was in effect. The Dastur al-Muluk, a Safavid administrative manual that portrays the world of the late Safavid era, further demonstrates that the youngsters of the Ardalan dynasty were raised in the royal court even at the conclusion of the Safavid era.

Kurdish tribal leaders were also given governor posts in provinces outside Kurdistan, particularly on the eastern and southern perimeter of Iran. The Safavids' policy of forcing the Kurdish tribes to migrate was what led to this result. Typically, Abbas I has been credited as the founder of this strategy when he supposedly had some Kurdish tribes moved from Kurdistan to Khorasan to protect the frontier from Uzbek intrusions. In reality, Tahmasp I was the one who first started it by having several Kurdish tribes moved to northern and northeastern Iran for the same reason. This strategy was continued and intensified by Abbas I.

=== 17th century ===
The size of Kurdistan and autonomy of the Ardalan valis decreased after the Iranian–Ottoman Treaty of Zohab in 1639. The western half of Kurdistan was ceded to the Ottomans, which included Shahrezur, Qaradagh, Qezelja, Sarutchek, Kirkuk, Rawandez, Emayideh, Koy, Harir and the western portion of Avraman. The extent of Kurdistan was thus now restricted to that of Sanandaj, Marivan, eastern Avraman, Baneh, Saqqeh, Javanrud, and some of the Jaf confederacy. This also led to the downfall of the Kurdish principalities of Shahrezur and Dinavar. The shah now had the authority to freely appoint and dismiss the vali, and Kurdish problems were from now on settled by appealing to Isfahan.

=== 18th century ===
Near the collapse of the Safavid state, Kurdistan was composed of the following administrative jurisdictions (also referred to as subordinate governorships): Avraman, Baneh, Bakhtiyari, Javanrud, Khorkhoreh, and Lorestan-e Feyli.

The Safavid era played a substantial role in the integration of Iranian Kurdistan into the political structure of Iran. The Kurdish local elites were strongly aware of their affiliation with Iran, which helped shape Iran's western border.

== List of governors ==
This is a list of the known figures who governed Kurdistan or parts of it. Beglerbegi, hakem and vali were all administrative titles designating the governor.

Date	Governor	Observations
1508–1536	Begeh Beg Ardalan	Vali of Kurdistan
1536–1539	Ma'mun Beg Ardalan	Son of the previous governor. Hakem of Kurdistan
1540	Soltan Ali Betlich	Hakem of Kurdistan
1540–1568	Sorkhab Beg Ardalan	Son of Ma'mun Beg Ardalan. Hakem of Kurdistan
1568	Gheyb Soltan Ustajlu	Hakem of Kurdistan and Lorestan
1568–1571	Soltan Ali Beg	Son of Sorkhab Beg Ardalan. Hakem of Kurdistan
1571–1578	Besat Beg Ardalan	Brother of the previous governor. Hakem of Kurdistan
1576 or 1557	Solaq Hoseyn Tekkelu	Hakem of the tribes of Kurdistan and some parts of Hamadan
1578	Eskandar Ardalan	Vali of Palangan
1578–1590	Timur Khan Soltan Ali Beg Ardalan	Hakem of Hasanabad and Palangan
1590–1617	Halow Khan Ardalan	Son of the previous governor
1617–1637	Khan Ahmad Khan Ardalan	Son of the previous governor. Beglerbegi of Kurdistan and held the military position of amir al-omara
1637–1657	Soleyman Khan Ardalan	Cousin of the previous governor. Beglerbegi of Kurdistan
1657–1678	Kalb Ali Khan Ardalan	Son of the previous governor. Beglerbegi of Kurdistan
1680–1682	Khosrow Khan Ardalan	Beglerbegi of Kurdistan
1682–1688	Timur Khan Ajarlu Shamlu	First non-Kurdish governor of Kurdistan.
1688–1694	Khan Ahmad Khan II Ardalan	Beglerbegi of Kurdistan
1694–1702	Mohammad Khan Ardalan	Beglerbegi of Kurdistan
1702–1705	Mohammad Khan Gorji	Beglerbegi of Kurdistan
1705–1707	Hasan Ali Khan	Beglerbegi of Kurdistan. Son of the grand vizier Mohammad Mo'men Khan Shamlu
1707–1709	Hoseyn Ali Khan	Beglerbegi of Kurdistan. Son of the grand vizier Mohammad Mo'men Khan Shamlu
1709–1711	Kay Khosrow Beg	Beglerbegi of Kurdistan
1710–1724	Abbasqoli Khan Ardalan	Beglerbegi of Kurdistan
1717–1720	Aliqoli Khan Ardalan	Beglerbegi of Kurdistan
1730–1736	Sobhanverdi Beg Ardalan	Beglerbegi of Kurdistan

== See also ==
- Ottoman Kurdistan

== Sources ==
- Floor, Willem (2008). Titles and Emoluments in Safavid Iran: A Third Manual of Safavid Administration, by Mirza Naqi Nasiri. Washington, D.C.: Mage Publishers. ISBN 978-1933823232.
- Khafipour, Hani (2021). "Beyond charismatic authority". In Matthee, Rudi (ed.). The Safavid World. Routledge. pp. 111–124.
- Matthee, Rudi (2011). Persia in Crisis: Safavid Decline and the Fall of Isfahan. I.B.Tauris. ISBN 978-0857731814.
- Matthee, Rudi (2015). "Relations between the Center and the Periphery in Safavid Iran: The Western Borderlands v. the Eastern Frontier Zone". The Historian. 77 (3): 431–463. doi:10.1111/hisn.12068. S2CID 143393018.
- Yamaguchi, Akihiko (2021). "The Kurdish frontier under the Safavids". In Matthee, Rudi (ed.). The Safavid World. Routledge. pp. 556–571.
- Yamaguchi, Akihiko (2023). "Mediating between the Royal Court and the Periphery: The Zangana Family's Brokerage in Safavid Iran (1501–1722)". Iran: Journal of the British Institute of Persian Studies. doi:10.1080/05786967.2023.2170814.
