= Mohammad-Amin Mirza =

Qajar prince (1819–1886)

- Photograph of Mohammad-Amin Mirza, Golestan Palace library

Deputy governor of Malayer and Tuyserkan
- Tenure: 1868–1869
- Governor: Aliqoli Mirza Qajar

Governor of Kamareh
- Tenure: 1870–1874

Governor of Golpayegan and Khansar
- Tenure: 1874–1886
- Born: Mohammad-Amin Mirza; 1819
- Died: 1886 (aged 66–67)
- Issue: Abdallah Khan
- Dynasty: Qajar
- Father: Fath-Ali Shah Qajar
- Mother: Moshtari Khanum
- Religion: Twelver Shia Islam

Mohammad-Amin Mirza (Persian: محمدامین میرزا; 1819 – 1886) was the Qajar prince and 45th son of Fath-Ali Shah Qajar.

== Biography ==
Mohammad-Amin Mirza was born to Fath-Ali Shah Qajar and Moshtari Khanum in 1819, Moshtari Khanum was born in Shiraz in an Artist family. During his childhood, his upbringing was entrusted to Naneh Kuchak, Fath-Ali Shah's personal cook, who was the daughter of Mohammad-Taqi Khan Zand.

From 1868 to 1869, he served as deputy governor of Malayer and Tuyserkan on behalf of his brother, Aliqoli Mirza Etezad os-Saltaneh. From 1870 to 1874, Served as governor of Kamareh. In 1874, he was appointed governor of Golpayegan and Khansar and served there until his death in 1886. Also subsequently served as governor of Sabzevar.

== Sources ==
- Azod od-Dowleh, Ahmad Mirza (1887). تاریخ عضدی [Azodi History] (in Persian). Maharat.
- Bamdad, Mehdi (1978). شرح حال رجال ایران در قرن ۱۲ و ۱۳ و ۱۴ هجری [Biographies of Iranian Notables in the 12th, 13th and 14th Centuries AH] (PDF) (in Persian). Vol. 5. Zavvar.
- Khavari, Mirza Fazlollah Shirazi (2001) [1845]. Afsharfar, Nasser (ed.). تاریخ ذوالقرنین [History of Dhul-Qarnayn] (in Persian). Vol. 2. Ministry of Culture and Islamic Guidance of Iran. ISBN 978-964-422-084-5.
- Bamdad, Mehdi (1972). شرح حال رجال ایران در قرن ۱۲ و ۱۳ و ۱۴ هجری [Biographies of Iranian Notables in the 12th, 13th and 14th Centuries AH] (PDF) (in Persian). Vol. 3. Zavvar.
- Ehtesham ol-Molk, Mirza Khanlar Khan (1972). سفرنامه میرزا خانلرخان اعتصام‌الملک [Travelogue of Mirza Khanlar Khan Ehtesham ol-Molk] (in Persian). Tehran: Ferdowsi Printing House.
