= Khosrow Khan Ardalan =

Khosrow Khan Ardalan was the Ardalan beglerbeg (governor) of Kurdistan from 1680 to 1682. He was unpopular amongst his subjects, who claimed his rule was oppressive. He was counselled several times to improve his way of governing, but they all proved ineffective. As a result, he was summoned to Isfahan, where he was executed at the Royal Square (Maydan-e Shah). He was replaced by Timur Khan Ajarlu Shamlu, the first non-Kurdish governor of the province.

== Sources ==
- Floor, Willem (2008). Titles and Emoluments in Safavid Iran: A Third Manual of Safavid Administration, by Mirza Naqi Nasiri. Washington, D.C.: Mage Publishers. ISBN 978-1933823232.
- Matthee, Rudi (2015). "Relations between the Center and the Periphery in Safavid Iran: The Western Borderlands v. the Eastern Frontier Zone". The Historian. 77 (3): 431–463. doi:10.1111/hisn.12068. S2CID 143393018.

| Preceded by Kalb Ali Khan Ardalan | Governor of Kurdistan; 1680–1682 | Succeeded by Timur Khan Ajarlu Shamlu |
