= Khold-e barin =

The Khold-e barin (Persian: خلد برین) is a Persian universal history composed by the Safavid historian Mohammad Yusof Vala Esfahani in 1667/68.

The phrase Rus-e manhus describing Russia as an ominous and dangerous country, first appears in the Khold-e barin. Although the Russians are specifically named in the phrase tava'ef-e manhus-e Rus ("ominous Russian groups"), in reality it refers to the Cossack attacks across the Caspian Sea in the early 17th-century. These attacks were a constant problem for both Russia and Iran, often devastating the Caspian coast and compelling the residents of Gilan and Mazandaran to construct fortifications. The general disinterest from the Iranians towards the lands north of the Caucasus Mountains is highlighted by this confusion, which reflects a lack of clear understanding.

The phrase mulk-i vasi' al-faza-yi Iran ("the expansive realm of Iran") appears in the Khold-e barin. This recurring expression highlights the authors' pride and recognition of his homeland. This expression is likely the fitting Persian way to describe an "empire" found in the writings of that time.

== Sources ==
- Matthee, Rudi (2009). "Was Safavid Iran an Empire?". Journal of the Economic and Social History of the Orient. 53 (1–2). Brill: 233–265. doi:10.1163/002249910X12573963244449.
- Matthee, Rudi (2012). "Introduction: Iranian Identity Boundaries: A Historical Overview". In Amanat, Abbas; Vejdani, Farzin (eds.). Iran Facing Others: Identity Boundaries in a Historical Perspective. Palgrave Macmillan. pp. 101–126. ISBN 978-1137013408.
- Quinn, Sholeh A. (2021). "Safavid Historiography: The place of the Safavids in the Iranian history". In Matthee, Rudi (ed.). The Safavid World. Routledge. pp. 164–182. ISBN 978-1138944060.
