= Battle of Chamchamal =

1774 Ottoman-Persian War battle

- Part of Ottoman–Persian War (1776–1779)
Date	November 1774
Location	Chamchamal, present-day Iraq
Result	Ottoman victory

Belligerents
Ottoman Empire	Zand Iran

Commanders and leaders
Ahmad Pasha	Ali-Morad Khan (POW)

Strength
3,000	12,000

Casualties and losses
Unknown	4,000–5,000 dead

The Battle of Chamchamal or Battle of Qara Chowalan was a battle during the Ottoman–Persian Wars in Chamchamal, present-day Iraq. In November 1774, an Ottoman force under the command of Baban Governor Ahmad Pasha inflicted a defeat on the Persian army under the command of Ali-Morad Khan at Chamchamal

== Background ==
The Governor of Baghdad, Omar Pasha, of Mamluk origin, began to interfere more in the internal affairs of the Baban, which was formally subordinate to the province and had recently shown closeness to Khosrow Khan, the governor of Transylvania under the Zand dynasty. Ultimately, in early 1774, he dismissed Mehmed Pasha and appointed Abdullah Pasha in his place. Mehmed Pasha then sought refuge in Transylvania, which was under Iranian rule. During the same period, Karim Khan was seeking an opportunity to attack the Ottoman Empire, which had suffered a defeat in the Russo-Turkish War. Both Mehmed Pasha's seeking refuge in Iran and the allegations that the Governor of Baghdad, Omar Pasha, had harassed Iranian pilgrims visiting Najaf and Karbala provided Karim Khan with justifications for declaring war on the Ottoman Empire.

== Battle ==
In October 1774, Karim Khan sent an army of 10,000 soldiers under the command of his brother-in-law, Ali Murad Khan, to Ardalan. The Iranian army, which had gained approximately 2,000 soldiers loyal to the (fugitive) Mehmed Pasha along the way, crossed the Ottoman-Iranian border in November and entered the Baban.

However, the Governor of Baghdad, Omar Pasha, was aware of this attack plan through spies in Shiraz, the capital of the Zand dynasty, thanks to Soleyman Aqa, the Mutasarrıf (governor) of Basra. Therefore, he was able to send reinforcements to Ahmad Pasha of Baban (brother of the fugitive Mehmed Pasha), who had taken over the governorship of Baban.

Ahmed Pasha, with his reinforcements and a force of approximately 3,000 soldiers, confronted the Iranian army at Chamchamal. Taking into account their numerical superiority, the Iranians launched an attack and initially pushed back the Ottoman unit, but Ali-Morad Khan's overconfidence in personally leading the attack and heading towards the center of the Ottoman units changed the fate of the battle. After Ali-Morad Khan was unhorsed and captured, the Iranian forces lost control, and the ensuing disintegration turned into a rout. As a result of the battle, which lasted about four hours, the Iranian army suffered 4,000-5,000 deaths and 10-12 officers captured in addition to the commander. Ali Morad was taken to Baghdad, where Omar Pasha was unwilling to precipitate in a direct conflict with Karim Khan Zand. Ali Morad was able to escape with nothing worse than a tongue-lashing.

== Sources ==
- Perry, John R. (2015). Karim Khan Zand: A History of Iran, 1747–1779. University of Chicago Press. ISBN 978-0-226-66102-5.
- Esposito, John L. (2009). The Oxford Encyclopedia of the Islamic World. Oxford University Press. ISBN 9780195305135.
