= Abbasqoli Khan Ardalan =

Governor of Safavid Kurdistan from 1710 to 1724

Abbasqoli Khan Ardalan was the Ardalan beglerbeg (governor) of Safavid Kurdistan from 1710 to 1724. Abd al-Karim Qazi, a leading religious leader in Ardalan played a role in this appointment. It appears that Abbasqoli Khan's alleged prominent performance during the retaliatory expedition against the Ghilzay leader Mirwais Hotak—who rebelled in Kandahar in 1709—was at least part of the reason for his appointment.

== Sources ==
- Floor, Willem (2008). Titles and Emoluments in Safavid Iran: A Third Manual of Safavid Administration, by Mirza Naqi Nasiri. Washington, D.C.: Mage Publishers. ISBN 978-1933823232.
- Yamaguchi, Akihiko (2023). "Mediating between the Royal Court and the Periphery: The Zangana Family's Brokerage in Safavid Iran (1501–1722)". Iran: Journal of the British Institute of Persian Studies. doi:10.1080/05786967.2023.2170814.

Preceded by Kay Khosrow Beg	Governor of Kurdistan; 1710–1724	Succeeded by Sobhanverdi Beg Ardalan
