= Khan Ahmad Khan Ardalan =

Governor of Kurdistan (1617/18 to 1637)

Khan Ahmad Khan Ardalan was the Ardalan beglerbeg (governor) of Kurdistan from 1617/18 to 1637. Before his tenure, he lived as a hostage at the royal court in Isfahan, where he spent his adolescence. There he reinforced the bond between the Safavids and Kurds by marrying Zarrin Kolah, a daughter of Shah Abbas I (r. 1588–1629). In 1617/18, Shah Abbas I dismissed Khan Ahmad Khan's father Halow Khan Ardalan as the governor of Kurdistan and had him sent to Isfahan, where he died in 1627/28. Khan Ahmad Khan was sent to Ardalan in his stead. In 1633, Khan Ahmad Khan rebelled after his two sons were blinded by Shah Safi (r. 1629–1642). Khan Ahmad Khan was defeated in 1637 and died in the same year. He was replaced by his cousin Soleyman Khan Ardalan.

== Sources ==
- Floor, Willem (2008). Titles and Emoluments in Safavid Iran: A Third Manual of Safavid Administration, by Mirza Naqi Nasiri. Washington, D.C.: Mage Publishers. ISBN 978-1933823232.
- Matthee, Rudi (2015). "Relations between the Center and the Periphery in Safavid Iran: The Western Borderlands v. the Eastern Frontier Zone". The Historian. 77 (3): 431–463. doi:10.1111/hisn.12068. S2CID 143393018.
- Yamaguchi, Akihiko (2021). "The Kurdish frontier under the Safavids". In Matthee, Rudi (ed.). The Safavid World. Routledge. pp. 556–571.

| Preceded by Halow Khan Ardalan | Governor of Kurdistan; 1617/18–1637 | Succeeded by Soleyman Khan Ardalan |
