= Battle of Khanaqin (1775) =

1775 battle

- Part of Ottoman–Persian War (1776–1779)
- Khanaqin
Date	1775
Location	Khanaqin, Iran 34.348333°N 45.390556°E
Result	Zand victory

Belligerents
Zand Iran	Pashalik of Baghdad

Commanders and leaders
Nazar 'Ali Khan Zand	'Abdollah Pasha

Strength
Unknown	3,000+

Casualties and losses
Negligible	2,000

The Battle of Khanaqin was an engagement fought between the forces of Zand Iran and the Ottoman pashalik of Baghdad. It resulted in an Iranian victory that heralded further engagements, being a theatre of the broader Ottoman–Persian War that happened at the time.

== Prelude ==
In January 1775, the brother of Persian dynast Karim Khan Zand, Sadeq Khan Zand, had set out to capture the vital commercial hub of Basra. Various raids were conducted and Shahrezur was captured, pressuring Ottoman action. Subsequently, the Ottomans inflicted a defeat on the Persians in Ardalan, winning a pitched battle at Qara Chowalan and humiliating the Zand commander. A new force was equipped and dispatched to alleviate the situation under Nazar 'Ali Khan Zand. He pursued the forces of the Ottoman governor of Bajlan, 'Abdollah Pasha.

== Battle ==
After an afternoon forced march, he caught up to 'Abdollah Pasha at Khanaqin and defeated him, inflicting significant losses and taking large amounts of their livestock. Ahmad Pasha, the victor of Qara Chowalan fled to Kirkuk after this pivotal engagement.

== Aftermath ==
Zand prestige in Kurdistan was restored as a result of this victory, and Nazar 'Ali plundered the region, intensifiying nearby raids that reached uncomfortably close to Baghdad. The Zands pressed demands to control more territories, eventually arranging for pashalik 'Omar Pasha to appoint the pro-Zand Mohammad Khan in charge of Qara Chowalan. However, the unexpected withdrawal of Nazar 'Ali Khan Zand resulted in a string of future defeats that compelled yet another Zand army to be dispatched, that later won the Battle of Shahrezur.

== Bibliography ==
- Perry, John R. (2015). Karim Khan Zand: A History of Iran, 1747-1779. University of Chicago Press. ISBN 9780226661025.
- Ateş, Sabri (2013). Ottoman-Iranian Borderlands: Making a Boundary, 1843–1914. Cambridge University Press. ISBN 9781107245082.
