= Timur Khan Ajarlu Shamlu =

Safavid governor of Kurdistan from 1682 to 1688

Timur Khan Ajarlu Shamlu (also spelled Teymur Khan Ajarlu'i) was the Safavid-appointed governor of Kurdistan from 1682 to 1688. Following the execution of the unpopular governor Khosrow Khan Ardalan, Shah Solayman (r. 1666–1694) had him replaced with Timur Khan, who became the first non-Kurdish governor of the province. Since Timur Khan was a foreigner with no connection to the province, he was eventually chased out by the locals. In 1688, he was replaced by Khan Ahmad Khan II Ardalan.

== Sources ==
- Floor, Willem (2008). Titles and Emoluments in Safavid Iran: A Third Manual of Safavid Administration, by Mirza Naqi Nasiri. Washington, D.C.: Mage Publishers. ISBN 978-1933823232.
- Matthee, Rudi (2015). "Relations between the Center and the Periphery in Safavid Iran: The Western Borderlands v. the Eastern Frontier Zone". The Historian. 77 (3): 431–463. doi:10.1111/hisn.12068. S2CID 143393018.

| Preceded by Khosrow Khan Ardalan | Governor of Kurdistan; 1682–1688 | Succeeded by Khan Ahmad Khan II Ardalan |
