= Towfiq-e rafiq =

Towfiq-e rafiq (Persian: توفیق رفیق) is an Iranian mirror for princes by Mohammad Ali Qazvini, which advises the reader on politics and morals. It was composed in the 1680s, during the reign of Shah Soleyman I (r. 1666–1694).

The book reflects Mohammad Ali Qazvini's strong pride in his hometown, Qazvin. A strong sense of Iranian identity is also displayed. However, it does not recognize Iran as a territory with distinct borders, but rather as a concept. Mohammad Ali Qazvini believed that just as Isfahan was the centre of civilization in Iran, Iran held the same status for the world:

"Paradisiacal Iran most of whose territory is situated in the fourth and third and second clime and which extends from the Oxus River to the River Euphrates, and from the Iron Gate [Darband in the Caucasus] to the Sea of Oman, is the civilized centre of the world and the summation of the cream of humanity, the virtues, the conditions, the intelligence and the perfection of its inhabitants of its populated regions exceeds those of the inhabitants of other lands and regions by far. And anyone who looks into it, will recognize that among those who have excelled or stood out in any of the rational and religious sciences or the arts, most are Iranians."

== Sources ==
- Matthee, Rudi (2021). "The idea of Iran in the Safavid period: Dynastic pre-eminence and Urban Pride". In Melville, Charles (ed.). Safavid Persia in the Age of Empires: The Idea of Iran. Vol. 10. I.B. Tauris. pp. 81–105.
