= Allahqoli Khan Zanganeh =

Kurdish noble and politician

Governor of Kermanshah
- In office Mid-1750s – 1785

Personal details
- Died: 1785 Kermanshah, Guarded Domains of Iran
- Relatives: Zanganeh tribe

Allahqoli Khan Zanganeh was a Kurdish nobleman from the Zanganeh tribe, who served as the governor of Kermanshah under the Zand dynasty from the mid-1750s until his death in 1785, when the Ardalan governor Khosrow Khan Bozorgi defeated him and seized the city.

== Sources ==
- Lambton, A.K.S. (1954). "Kirmānshāh". The Encyclopaedia of Islam. BRILL. pp. 167–171. ISBN 9789004060562.
- Calmard, Jean (2015). "Kermanshah iv. History from the Arab Conquest to 1953". Encyclopaedia Iranica.
