= Soleyman Khan Ardalan =

Governor of Kurdistan

Soleyman Khan Ardalan was the Ardalan beglerbeg (governor) of Kurdistan from 1637 to 1657. He is notable for having founded the city of Sanandaj in 1636/37, which would serve as the capital of the Ardalan principality until its dissolution in the 1860s. He was the cousin of Khan Ahmad Khan Ardalan, who had previously served as the governor of Kurdistan from 1617 to 1637. Following the Iranian–Ottoman Treaty of Zohab in 1639, Soleyman Khan lost the western half of his domain to the Ottomans, which included Shahrezur, Qaradagh, Qezelja, Sarutchek, Kirkuk, Rawandez, Emayideh, Koy, Harir and the western portion of Avraman. The extent of Kurdistan was thus now restricted to that of Sanandaj, Marivan, eastern Avraman, Baneh, Saqqeh, Javanrud, and some of the Jaf confederacy.

Soleyman Khan was eventually dismissed by Shah Abbas II (r. 1642–1666) for planning a revolt with the help of the Ottoman Empire. He was exiled to Mashhad in Khorasan, while his eldest son Kalb Ali Khan Ardalan was appointed the new governor.

== Sources ==
- Floor, Willem (2008). Titles and Emoluments in Safavid Iran: A Third Manual of Safavid Administration, by Mirza Naqi Nasiri. Washington, D.C.: Mage Publishers. ISBN 978-1933823232.
- Yamaguchi, Akihiko (2021). "The Kurdish frontier under the Safavids". In Matthee, Rudi (ed.). The Safavid World. Routledge. pp. 556–571.

Preceded by Khan Ahmad Khan Ardalan	Governor of Kurdistan; 1637–1657	Succeeded by Kalb Ali Khan Ardalan
