= Battle of Sanandaj =

- Part of Ottoman–Persian War (1776–1779)
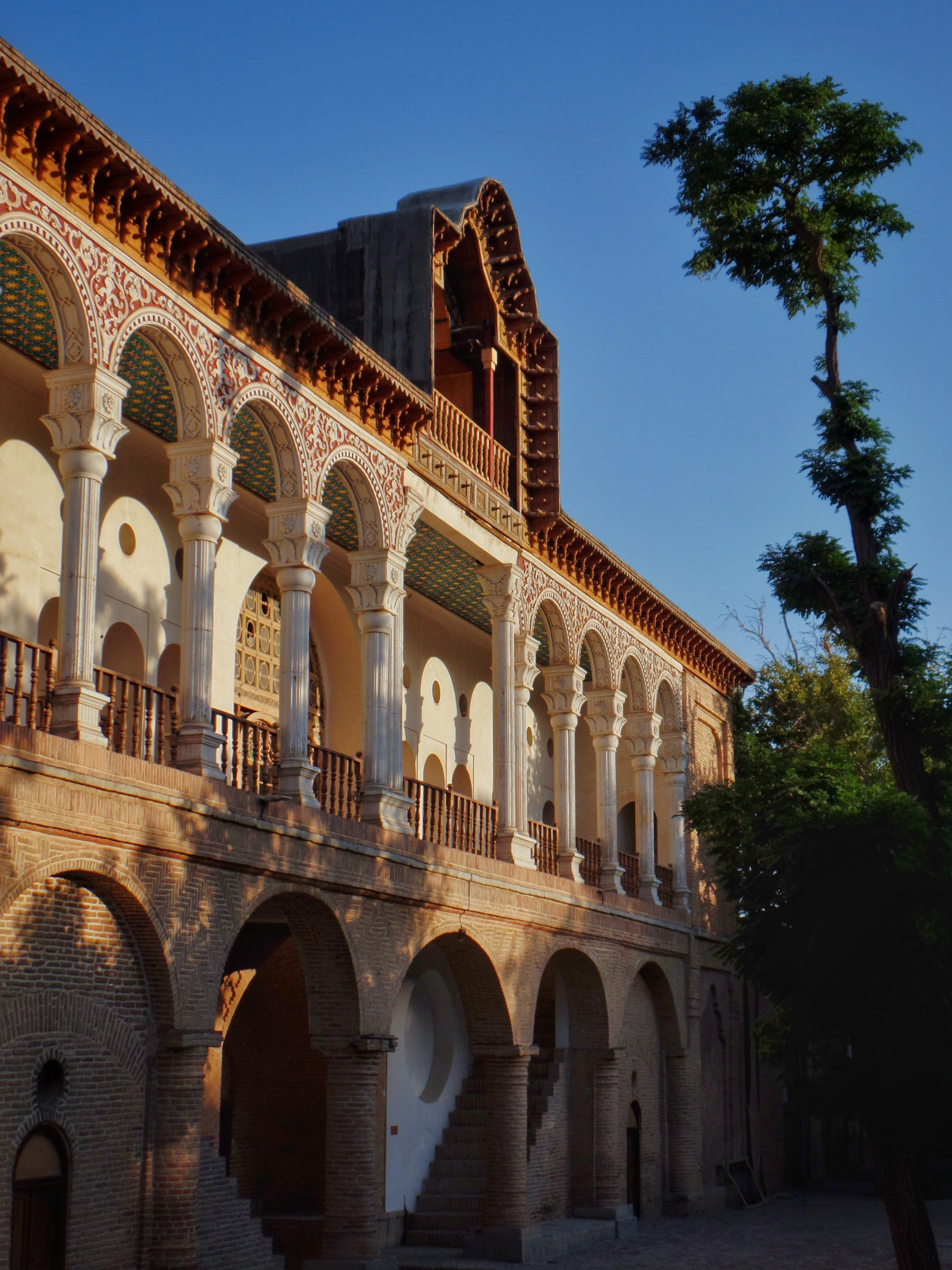
- Sanandaj
Date	5 May 1777
Location	Sanandaj, present-day Iran
Result	Ottoman victory

Belligerents
Ottoman Empire	Zand Iran

Commanders and leaders
Mehmed Pasha	Khosrow Khan

Casualties and losses
Unknown	2,000–3,000

The Battle of Sanandaj was a battle in the Ottoman–Persian War (1776–1779). On May 5, 1777, an Ottoman force under the command of Babanlı Mehmed Pasha, the governor of Baban, inflicted a defeat on the Persian army under Khosrow Khan, the governor of Sanandaj of the Zand Dynasty, at Sanandaj.

== Background ==
Following the attack by the Zand Dynasty of Iran on the Baban Sanjak in 1774 and the siege and occupation of Basra on April 16, 1776, the Ottoman Empire officially declared war on Iran on May 2, 1776. In this context, the Ottoman capital first tried to strengthen its influence over the provincial administration in Iraq during the period of 1776-1777, and then attacked Ardalan from the Baban side in the spring of 1777.

Hasan Pasha, the governor of Kirkuk and Shahrizor, launched an attack from the Mosul front. Within the force under his command, he assigned duties to Babanlı Mehmed Pasha, the Mutasarrıf of the Baban Sanjak, and his brother, Babanlı Ahmed Pasha, the Mutasarrıf of the Köy and Harir Sanjaks (who had defeated the Iranian army in the Battle of Chamchamal in 1774). He sent Ahmed Pasha from the Zohab direction towards Kermanshah, and Mehmed Pasha from Kara Çulan towards Sanandaj. The Ottoman unit under the command of Mehmed Pasha defeated the forces of Saleh Khan, the Iranian governor of Baneh, in the Battle of Baneh on April 22. Afterwards, they invaded Baneh and advanced towards Sanandaj.

== Battle ==
In order to intercept the Ottoman forces advancing towards Sanandaj after invading Baneh, the Iranians mobilized troops under the command of Khosrow Khan, the governor of Sanandaj. The two armies clashed on May 5, 1777, in the region between Sanandaj and Marivan.

Relying on his numerical superiority, Mehmed Pasha attacked the Iranian army. In the battle, which was mainly fought with swords, muskets, and spears by cavalry units, the Iranian army suffered heavy losses within a few hours, and when Khosrow Khan fled wounded, the defeat of the Iranian army turned into a rout.

Mirza Ali and Mirza Mehdi, sons of Mirza Abdullah Vezir from the people of Ardalan, Nasrullah Bey, son of Yusuf Bey, Abdullah Bey-i Munshi, and some of the leading figures of the province lost their lives in the battle, while Mirza Ahmed, son of Mirza Abdullah, and some of the leading figures of the province were taken prisoner.

== Sources ==
- Aksun, Ziya Nur (1994). Osmanlı Tarihi. Vol. 2. Istanbul: Ötüken Yayınları. ISBN 9754371458.
- Perry, John R. (2015). Karim Khan Zand: A History of Iran, 1747–1779. University of Chicago Press. ISBN 978-0-226-66102-5.
