= Rostam al-Hokama =

Iranian scribe and historian (1766–1848)

- Born: 1766; Shiraz, Zand Iran
- Died: 1848 (aged 81–82); Qajar Iran
- Occupations: Scribe and historian
- Writing career
- Language: Persian
- Notable work: Rostam al-Tavarikh

Rostam al-Hokama (Persian: رستم الحکما; 1766–1848) was a scribe and historian during the late Zand and early Qajar eras in Iran. He is principally known as the author of the historical chronicle Rostam al-Tavarikh.

His real name was Mohammad Hashem while "Rostam al-Hokama" was his honorific; and his pen-name was Asaf. He was the son of Amir Mohammad Hassan Khosh-Hekayat and a daughter of Amir Mokhtar Hosseini. The Iranian scholar Mohammad Taqi Danesh Pajouh considered Rostam al-Hokama to be the grandnephew of Mirza Samia, the author of the Tazkera al-Moluk.

Rostam al-Hokama's existence has been called into question because he is not mentioned in any of the literary or historical writings of the Zand and Qajar eras. However, Rostam al-Hokama frequently made reference to himself, other individuals, and certain events from their lives in his books and treatises. These sources make it evident that he was born and raised in Shiraz, moved to Isfahan for education as a teenager, where he spent a significant amount of time studying at the Akhund Mullah Asadullah school.

Rostam al-Hokama, whose earlier works on statecraft were rooted in tradition and lacked critique, departed from this style in 1829 following the Iranian defeat in the Russo-Iranian War of 1826–1828. He compared the socio-political structures of Iran and Europe. He explored the shortcomings of traditional Iranian governance while highlighting the strengths and organization of Western political systems. He criticized the shah in his book Ahkam ("Rules") for refusing to "educate the subjects and the army through correct law and rational organization."

He encouraged the shah to search outside of Iranian history for political ideas while also recommending him to retrieve the fiscal and administrative books of previous Iranian shahs, Tahmasp II (r. 1722–1732), Nader Shah (r. 1736–1747) and Karim Khan Zand (r. 1751–1779).

== Sources ==
- Arjomand, Saïd Amir (2025). Persianate Historical Sociology: Collected Essays. Brill. ISBN 978-9004742529.
- Al-i Davud, Seyyed Ali (2022). "رستم الحکما". The Great Islamic Encyclopaedia (in Persian).
- Fereshteh, Majidi (2018). "رستم التواریخ". The Great Islamic Encyclopaedia (in Persian).
- Perry, John R. (1979). Karim Khan Zand: A History of Iran, 1747–1779. University of Chicago Press. ISBN 978-0226660981.
