= Mokhtasar-e Mofid =

17th-century Iranian geographical text

Mokhtasar-e Mofid was a geographical text written by the Iranian administrator Mohammad Mofid Mostofi Bafqi in 1680/81 at Lahore. It is of significant value because it is the only known geographical writing related to the Safavid era.

The text cites sources from both the past and present. In keeping with tradition, the word "Iran" appears rarely throughout the text and usually in reference to "Turan" and/or "Hendustan", or when Iran is under attack or invasion by its opponents. However, the boundaries of Iran are made clear, as is the arrangement of its different regions. The text is filed with a strong sense of nostalgia and longing for home. Many contemporary Iranian writers who moved to India in search of new opportunities expressed a similar sense of nostalgia, reflecting their feelings of separation and loss.

The text highlights its Shia Muslim perspective in the listing, since Arabian Iraq is given a prominent position, and Mashhad is given significant attention with twenty-two pages dedicated to it. In contrast, Shiraz only receives a brief mention of just two pages.

== Sources ==
- Matthee, Rudi (2009). "Was Safavid Iran an Empire?". Journal of the Economic and Social History of the Orient. 53 (1–2). Brill: 233–265. doi:10.1163/002249910X12573963244449.
- Matthee, Rudi (2021). "The idea of Iran in the Safavid period: Dynastic pre-eminence and Urban Pride". In Melville, Charles (ed.). Safavid Persia in the Age of Empires: The Idea of Iran. Vol. 10. I.B. Tauris. pp. 81–105.
- Matthee, Rudi (2021b). "Moḵtaṣar-e Mofid". Encyclopaedia Iranica Online. Brill.
