= The Pursuit of Pleasure: Drugs and Stimulants in Iranian History, 1500–1900 =

2005 book by Rudolph P. Matthee

- Cover
- Author: Rudolph P. Matthee
- Language: English
- Subject: Iranian history, social history
- Publisher: Princeton University Press
- Publication date: 2005
- Publication place: United States
- Media type: Print, digital
- Pages: 368
- ISBN: 9780691144443
- The book was published under license under the same title by Mage Publishers, Washington D.C. Namak Publications, an Iranian publisher, published a Persian version of the book.

The Pursuit of Pleasure: Drugs and Stimulants in Iranian History, 1500–1900 is a 2005 book by Dutch-American historian and Iranologist Rudolph P. Matthee. Matthee studies the significant role of psychoactive substances such as wine, opiates, tobacco, coffee, and tea in Iranian society between the 16th and 19th centuries. He explores the cultural, economic, and political implications of psychoactive substance use in Iran, examining both popular practices and the responses of religious and secular authorities. The book received the 2006 Albert Hourani Book Award and the 2006 Saidi-Sirjani Award from the International Society of Iranian Studies. A Persian translation was published by Namak Publications in Tehran.

== Background ==
In a 2024 interview with ABC Australia, Matthee revealed that his interest in Iran partially stems from the fact that as an undergraduate in Holland, he chose an exotic subject to explore (Iran). In 1976-77, he also lived in Iran for one year, and there became acquainted with the widespread use of opium. This initial interest ultimately developed into a long-term academic engagement, culminating in the publication of The Pursuit of Pleasure. During the interview, he explained why Opium consumption in Iran goes hand in hand with tea, especially considering tea's dehydration side effects, and the social aspect of tea drinking in Iran and Asia in general. Matthee reflected on the "dividing line between coffee and tea" in Europe, explaining why some regions in Europe tend to drink tea (especially Protestant countries, the U.K. and the Nordic countries), while others were dominated by coffee.

== Summary ==
The book is a social history that studies the production, trade, and consumption of psychoactive substances in Iran during the Safavid (1501-1722) and Qajar (1796-1925) periods. Using Persian, Arabic, Turkish, and European sources, including travel accounts, chronicles, and commercial records from the Dutch and English East India Companies, Matthee demonstrates how wine, opium, tobacco, coffee, and tea shaped Iranian society while highlighting how actual consumption patterns often contradicted Islamic legal norms, especially regarding wine and opium.

The book is structured chronologically in two parts. The first section studies the Safavid period, where Matthee discusses the centrality of wine in court culture despite Islamic prohibitions. Wine consumption served symbolic functions: it demonstrated royal power beyond religious law, as the Shah's divine status supposedly placed him above Islamic strictures, and it facilitated social bonding among elites. Opium, legally permissible and affordable, was widely used across all social classes primarily for medicinal purposes, consumed as pills rather than smoked. The rapid adoption of tobacco in the early 17th century—making Iran one of the first regions outside the Americas to embrace smoking culture—and the emergence of coffeehouses as spaces for both leisure and potential political subversion, illustrate what Matthee argues was a "vibrant rather than atrophying society" readily incorporating new consumables.

The second part focuses on the Qajar era, marked by transformations. While the Qajars officially projected greater piety and temperance due to their weaker legitimacy and dependence on clerical support, wine consumption persisted privately and increasingly included imported spirits like vodka and champagne. The shift from eating to smoking opium in the 19th century created more severe addiction problems and transformed Iran into a major opium exporter, with consequences for food production and rural society. The Tobacco Revolt of 1891, where Iranians boycotted tobacco to protest a British monopoly concession, demonstrated how these substances could catalyze political resistance. Tea gradually displaced coffee as the national beverage, influenced by Russian and British imperial preferences and falling prices that democratized consumption across classes.

The book highlights the discrepancy between normative religious prescriptions and everyday practices, and argues that Iranian society maintained a complex accommodation between official Islamic ideals and popular indulgence. Economic considerations often trumped moral concerns, as rulers relied heavily on tax revenues from these substances. The book also illuminates class distinctions (wine remained largely elite while opium crossed social boundaries), gender dynamics (women's segregated consumption patterns), and regional variations in consumption.

== Translations ==
A Persian version was published by Namak Publications in Tehran.

== Awards ==
- Winner of the 2006 Albert Hourani Book Award, Middle East Studies Association
- Winner of the 2006 Saidi-Sirjani Award, International Society of Iranian Studies

== Events ==
In July 2019, the House of Writers in Tehran hosted a review session for the Persian translation of "The Pursuit of Pleasure," translated by Mani Salehi-Allameh and published by Namak Publications. The event featured speeches by the translator alongside scholars Ebrahim Musapur and Seyyed Saeid Mir-Mohammad-Sadeq, bringing together Iranian literati to discuss Matthee's examination of intoxicants and stimulants in Iranian history.

== Critical reception ==
Yann Richard of Sorbonne Nouvelle University considered the book a natural continuation of Matthee's scholarship on Iranian social history, and commended his "masterly erudition" in synthesizing sources in Persian, Turkish, Arabic, Russian, French, German, Dutch, and English, including contemporary Iranian chronicles, European travel accounts, and commercial archives from the English East India Company and its Dutch counterpart, the VOC. Richard welcomed the focus on the "other side" of history—pleasure and consumption rather than wars and politics—and highlighted Matthee's analysis of how royal wine drinking among Safavid shahs served as a demonstration of their suprareligious status, being "beyond the strictures of Islam" and embodying the body politic. The review drew attention to the work’s thoughtful engagement with opium's transformation from medical use to destructive social problem when smoking replaced ingestion in the nineteenth century, and tea's triumph over coffee due to British and Russian imperial influence. While identifying some shortcomings, including the absence of Xavier de Planhol's work on Shiraz wine and a "simplistic transcription" that rendered some terms into "odd riddle," Richard concluded the book was insightful and valuable.

Samvel Margarian of the Caucasian Centre for Iranian Studies described Matthee's monograph as a deeply researched account of the import and diffusion of stimulants in Iran between 1500 and 1900, singling out the author’s careful tracing of the trade routes through which these goods entered the country. Margarian drew particular attention to Matthee’s insight into the influence of Georgian and Armenian viticultural traditions on Iranian wine culture. According to Margarian, the book convincingly shows how top-quality Georgian wines were brought into major Iranian cities, largely by Armenian merchants from New Julfa, and notes Shah Abbas's frequent participation in Armenian Christian festivities where alcohol was consumed. He was especially struck by Matthee's discussion of how Persian drinking practices, while preserving indigenous elements, absorbed Caucasian customs such as structured feasting rituals and formalized toasting traditions that echoed Sasanian etiquette. Margarian noted the inclusion of specific regional data, such as late-19th-century vodka consumption, as adding empirical depth to the analysis. Aside from pointing out a minor chronological error concerning Griboyedov's death, Margarian praised the work as "a clear and lucid presentation of the use of stimulating substances in Late-Medieval and Early-Modern Iran."

Richard W. Bulliet described the work as a major contribution that adeptly used the post-revolutionary debates in Iran as a lens through which to explore four centuries of social and economic dynamics surrounding intoxicants. He emphasized Matthee’s impressive command of sources—particularly his ability to navigate Dutch East India Company archives alongside Persian and various European texts—which added depth and breadth to the analysis. Bulliet also praised the book’s clear periodization, distinguishing between the Safavid and post-Safavid eras, and singled out Matthee’s sophisticated handling of the contradiction between widespread royal indulgence in alcohol and recurring clerical efforts to suppress it. He pointed to Matthee’s compelling argument that this royal excess echoed pre-Islamic models, with Safavid monarchs portrayed as "doomed by their rank to alcoholic overindulgence." Bulliet found the sections on 19th-century domestic production and export of tea, opium, and tobacco especially valuable, noting how the profitability of opium cultivation disrupted food production, creating tensions in the rural economy. While he suggested the Iranian case could have been more explicitly tied into global historical trends, he described the book as a "lucid, precise, and information-packed volume" that sets a high bar for social and economic historiography. Bulliet saw the work as a compelling illustration of Iran’s historical complexity, where "tolerance and personal enjoyment repeatedly reemerge after episodes of puritanical control."

Michael Pearson described the book as a strong contribution to the social history of early modern Iran. Pearson commended the book's thematic rather than chronological organization and its demonstration of how analyzing substances that provided pleasure opened "new ways to see Iranian society" and illuminated Iran's relations with the expanding world economy. The reviewer particularly appreciated Matthee's nuanced treatment of the gap between Islamic prohibitions and actual practice, noting how the author "convincingly demonstrated that wine was very widely consumed" despite religious strictures, with the ulama lacking political power to enforce their prohibitions. Pearson highlighted the book's attention to class distinctions (wine being too expensive for most Iranians), regional variations, and the impact of changing global trade patterns, especially regarding tea's transition from exotic foreign commodity to universal beverage. While acknowledging the work's richness in covering alcohol, tobacco, opium, coffee, and tea, Pearson noted that other forms of pleasure like games, hunting, poetry, and prostitution might have enhanced the study, though he concluded this was "a very minor cavil" for what he deemed "a very rich and readable book," "a gripping read," and "an excellent study" that "deserves to be very widely consulted."

Leyla Rouhi of Williams College praised Matthee's work as irresistibly engaging from its title and cover illustration through its fascinating exploration of wine, opium, tea, coffee, and tobacco in Safavid and Qajar Iran. She commended the book's sensitivity to economic and cultural factors and its careful contextualization of each substance within broader frameworks, particularly highlighting Matthee's analysis of the continuous tension between secular and religious leadership and how the "banning, release, control, or legislation of the drug or stimulant" related to tensions within sovereignty structures. While appreciating the work's appeal to a wide readership and its ability to help readers reevaluate preconceptions about Iranian history, Rouhi identified two areas needing development: first, given the book's potentially diverse audience, she wished for more rigorous discussion of how sources were chosen and prioritized, particularly regarding the reliability of accounts by travelers like Pietro Della Valle and Jean Chardin; second, she noted that while Matthee frequently mentioned connections between stimulant use and sexual behavior, this "highly complex topic" deserved more focused analysis beyond its anecdotal presence. Despite these critiques, Rouhi concluded that the book successfully tackled "a topic about which almost everyone has an opinion" and provided valuable insights into objects that have played prominent roles in daily Iranian life for centuries, noting personally that she would "never smoke her own qalyan again without thinking of its amazing history."

Joshua Lourence approached The Pursuit of Pleasure as a revealing exploration of Iranian society, describing it as “highly effective” in uncovering the underlying values and social shifts of early modern Iran through the lens of intoxicant use. Rather than presenting a uniform historical arc, Matthee’s chronological split between the Safavid (chapters 1–6) and Qajar (chapters 7–10) eras allows for a focused comparison: the former highlighting royal wine culture, the latter tracing Iran’s deeper entanglement with global stimulant trades like tea and coffee. Lourence singled out the contrast between religious doctrine and lived realities—particularly the clerical inability to suppress alcohol consumption—and emphasized opium’s broader social reach in contrast to elite wine rituals. He also pointed to the book’s attention to agrarian and economic shifts, such as farmland diversion toward cash crops and the political fallout from the tobacco concession. While Lourence found the analysis perceptive and the structure well-organized, he critiqued the editing, noting inconsistencies in the transition between Gregorian and Islamic dates. Nevertheless, he viewed these issues as minor and felt the book succeeded in illuminating Iran’s complex cultural landscape through its intoxicants.

In her assessment, Joanna de Groot regarded Matthee’s study as a meaningful contribution to global consumption history—particularly for extending the conversation beyond Europe and North America. Rather than emphasizing narrative clarity or thematic coherence, she drew attention to the book’s layered approach: it juxtaposes shifting governmental controls, uneven enforcement of religious norms, and divergent class-based consumption practices. De Groot appreciated the book’s accessibility to non-specialist readers and its rich empirical foundation drawn from Persian and European sources. Still, she raised several analytical concerns. In her view, the descriptive richness occasionally overwhelmed interpretation, and the treatment of foreign perspectives lacked critical distance. More importantly, she noted that the study underutilized contemporary theoretical frameworks on consumption, culture, and social transformation. Had Matthee more explicitly engaged with literature on colonialism, addiction discourse, or the cultural framing of vice and pleasure, she suggested, the book’s critical edge might have sharpened. Even so, de Groot concluded that the work is “thoughtful and informative,” and likely to inspire further research into global patterns of pleasure, discipline, and material life in Iranian history.

James McHugh of Harvard University considered it a valuable contribution that filled a significant gap in scholarship. McHugh noted that while many historical studies of drugs and stimulants focused on Europe and America, and Iranian cultural history had examined intoxication primarily as poetic metaphor, Matthee provided "a fascinating and detailed study of the actual consumption of psychoactive substances in Iran." McHugh commended the book's chronological organization through the Safavid (1500-1800) and Qajar periods, highlighting Matthee's key findings about how wine drinking remained predominantly an elite activity despite Islamic prohibition, with royal cellars being "locked up, not destroyed" during periodic bans, and how in the Qajar period drinking shifted from public royal banquets to private consumption that served as "a statement of resistance to intolerant religious authorities." The reviewer noted the contrasting history of opium, which faced no religious stigma and spread across all social classes as the "hashish of the poor," though its shift from pill consumption to smoking in the Qajar period created a surge in addiction that contributed to the 1870 famine. McHugh particularly praised Matthee's methodological innovation in his "confident, copious, yet sensitive use of contemporary Western accounts," moving beyond examining them solely for Orientalist perspectives to using them as valuable sources for understanding Iranian society. He thought that the exploration of tensions between religious ideals and social reality, in the book, reflected "the nature of Islam as a communal religion of outward conformity," calling the work both "a seminal mine of information" and "a subtle and complex analysis of society, religion, economics, and the consumption of psychoactive substances in a non-Western context."

In his review, James H. Mills described The Pursuit of Pleasure as the culmination of Rudi Matthee’s long-standing engagement with the more sensual dimensions of Iranian cultural history. He was particularly struck by the book’s ability to map the effects of global trade on local consumption patterns, observing that by the 17th century, substances like tobacco had become embedded in everyday life to a degree that outpaced their adoption in the West. For Mills, the true strength of the work lay in its economic and social observations: opium exports in the 19th century came to rival the earlier importance of silk, while state dependence on revenues from drugs and stimulants created a dissonance between moral posturing and fiscal pragmatism. He cited Matthee’s vivid portrayal of Shah Sultan Husayn’s failed temperance as emblematic of a broader societal duality—where religious figures could indulge privately without feeling ideological conflict. Although Mills wished the book had more fully incorporated theoretical frameworks like modernization theory or Habermasian public sphere analysis, he found its empirical depth and accessible prose valuable well beyond historical scholarship. In his view, it is a book that policy thinkers and social scientists would do well to engage with.

Fakhreddin Azimi regarded Matthee’s book as a major scholarly contribution that sheds new light on the interplay between cultural practice, economic policy, and state power in early modern Iran. He emphasized how the book’s two-part division enables a clear comparative reading of Safavid and Qajar approaches to intoxicants. In the Safavid era, substances like wine, opium, and tobacco were widely integrated into both elite and popular life—despite Islamic prohibitions—with the state tolerating behaviors that sustained revenue streams, even prostitution and hashish use. Azimi underscored Matthee’s portrayal of Safavid society as lively and adaptive, open to imported pleasures such as coffee and shaped by emergent public venues like coffeehouses. Transitioning to the Qajar period, Azimi drew attention to shifting symbolic meanings: wine, for example, evolved from a courtly indulgence into an act of quiet resistance. He also pointed out the socioeconomic toll of Iran’s turn to opium as an export crop, linking increased cultivation to famine and addiction. What Azimi found most compelling was Matthee’s depiction of the disjunction between religious doctrine and everyday behavior—a society where religious control was less a matter of enforcement than appearance, and where formal prohibitions often coexisted with personal freedom.

Evangelos Venetis of the University of Leiden welcomed the book and described it as "a groundbreaking work in the field of pre-modern and early modern Iranian studies" that addresses an "underdeveloped area of Iranian material culture" - the historical role of drugs and stimulants in contrast to the vast majority of published works focusing on spiritual-immaterial aspects of Iranian civilization. Venetis appreciated the book's chronological presentation and thematic division between the Safavid period (1500-1796) and Qajar period (1796-1911), detailing how the work examines alcohol, opium, tobacco, coffee, and tea. He highlighted Matthee's key argument that Iran's experience with stimulants was not different from other countries, and that these beverages influenced political and social life, being "strongly associated with the departure of Safavid kingship and state from their nomadic tribal traditions to a more sophisticated, bureaucratic and centralized model." Venetis noted the book's exploration of the power struggle between Iranian kingship and Shi'ite clergy, and the "creative tension between hedonism and puritanism," while correctly suggesting that Iranian society was "not static, but evolving, changing many of its features each time." While identifying minor editorial imperfections including typos and the absence of a transliteration system for Arabic script, Venetis concluded that Matthee had "drawn on an exhaustive bulk of information, coming from primary sources" to provide "both the pharmacological and social dimensions of stimulants," offering readers "a totally new aspect of Iranian society." He expected the account would "stimulate the interest of other scholars and lead to the creation of more accounts in the vastly unexplored area of the material culture of Iran and other countries."

Donald Quataert of Binghamton University praised it as "an impressive account" that serves as "a healthy corrective to tired and unsupportable views of a declining Middle East after 1500," instead appropriately considering the introduction and spread of these substances as marks of "a vibrant rather than an atrophying society." Quataert commended Matthee's nuanced approach, noting that readers "will look in vain for simple-minded general statements" and instead find sophisticated discussions of patterns changing over time and place, with constant attention to distinguishing "between the ideal and the real in Iranian society and life." He appreciated Matthee's skill at "finding traces of evidence embedded in otherwise irrelevant narratives" and his complex analysis that goes beyond mere emulation, as demonstrated in the example of wine use where early Safavid shahs could drink openly "precisely because such behavior marked and was appropriate to charismatic kingship," while later Safavid and Qajar rulers lacking such legitimacy needed more public circumspection. Quataert highlighted the book's demonstration that "widespread use almost always was not abuse" and its attention to economic factors, such as tea's nineteenth-century triumph over coffee deriving from "the growing price gap between the two and the important role of Russia." While finding the opening historical overview "unhelpful and distracting" for specialists and noting that historiographical issues about receptivity deserved earlier treatment, Quataert acknowledged the source limitations that favor elites and urban populations over "peasants and workers [who] remain distant and vague figures." Despite these constraints, he concluded that "this is an excellent book of great utility" that "opens up new avenues of understanding social history for Middle East historians" and offers equal value to those seeking to understand stimulant use "in a region previous known mainly through stereotypes," predicting it "will be read with much profit by specialists and generalists alike."

Anja Pistor-Hatam praised Matthee's "excellently researched book" for revealing patterns of continuity in Iranian social life over centuries, particularly highlighting how "in Iran, the tension between outward conformity and private freedom has often taken the form, less of a dichotomy than of an ambiguous play between hedonistic and puritanical forces" fitting into what Roy Mottahedeh calls "a kaleidoscopic world of meaningful ambiguity." She commended the book's structure dividing the Safavid period (1501-1722) and Qajar period (1779-1921) into thematic chapters on wine, opium, tobacco, coffee, and tea, which allows readers to engage with each chapter independently while noting inevitable repetitions. Pistor-Hatam appreciated Matthee's placement of the study within the wider context of consumption history, particularly praising his analysis of how geographical factors and social status influenced whether northern or southern Iranians drank tea or coffee in the nineteenth century. She highlighted the book's demonstration of the complex relationship between politics, economics, religion and consumption, exemplified by the 1891 Tobacco Revolt when Iranians, despite being heavy smokers, refrained from smoking to protest an English tobacco monopoly. The reviewer found particular value in Matthee's explanation of cultural differences in understanding opium, which Iranians viewed medicinally rather than as stigmatized, and his discussion of Galenic concepts of "hot" and "cold" foods affecting consumption patterns. Drawing on Persian sources, European visitor accounts, and archival materials including Verenigde Oostindische Compagnie records, Pistor-Hatam concluded that Matthee "convincingly argues that consumption habits are related to economic, social and political issues, religion being only a factor among many," illustrating how normative religious texts do not necessarily reflect historical reality, as evidenced by mullahs who changed turbans for European hats when drinking wine. Despite noting minor spelling errors and editorial oversights, she endorsed the work as an important contribution to understanding Iranian material culture.

In his review, Willem Floor said that the book's "main interest is not so much that it has added much new material to our knowledge, but rather that it has brought together in one book much of the information extant on the use and social role of addictive substances in Iranian society between 1500 and 1900." Floor applauded the clear structure, especially the first providing political context for non-specialists. He underscored Matthee's demonstration that "depending on their means and the availability and price of stimulants, Persians consumed them with abandon showing they were and are remarkably like people elsewhere". Floor viewed the book’s insight into "the cleavage between norm and reality" as a compelling reflection of the dual nature of the human condition, extending to Muslim societies as well. While praising the work's engaging style, Floor identified several limitations: the absence of production process details, uneven treatment of economic aspects with "much quantified commercial data on, e.g., coffee, but very little on tea," missing information on tea and tobacco varieties despite available studies, and incomplete coverage of the 1891 tobacco protest's aftermath, noting that "the Regime was imposed anyway (via a nominally Ottoman company in 1892), which resulted in worse financial consequences for the peasants." Despite these observations, Floor said that they were "not meant to detract from the merits of this book."

Ebrahim Musa Pour viewed Rudolph Matthee’s work as a significant and commendable contribution to the social history of Iran, particularly for its methodological rigor and reliance on rare archival sources. He praised the book as "a masterpiece for those interested in social history," emphasizing its originality and depth in illuminating neglected aspects of Iranian life during the Qajar era. The reviewer noted the scarcity of comparable Iranian-authored works due to limited access to historical records and lauded Matthee’s use of Dutch, Portuguese, and Spanish documents. He found the book's exploration of social phenomena, such as hidden drinking practices and class-based alcohol consumption, both revealing and culturally insightful. While he acknowledged the book’s strengths in documenting the continuity of alcohol consumption post-Islamization, he also critiqued certain generalizations about class differences between the Safavid and Qajar periods as requiring further evidence. Overall, he regarded Matthee’s analysis as a valuable and nuanced intervention in Iranian social historiography.

Jean-Pierre Digard praised Matthee's work as a pioneering study addressing the surprising lack of scholarship on psychoactive substances in Iranian history and culture, noting that previous work had mainly focused on ritual aspects of hashish in medieval Islam. Digard highlighted Matthee's "functionalist" approach that explains phenomena through their context and their disappearance through changing conditions, with particular attention to three key themes: external influences (such as the 16th-century addition of tobacco and coffee to wine and opium, and the 19th-century replacement of coffee by tea), divergences between religious norms promoted by the ulema and the disorders of real life especially under the Safavids, and contrasts between historical change and continuity, with alcoholism perceived with guilt under the Safavids becoming an act of defiance and resistance under the Qajars. Following the book's chronological structure through the Safavid (1501-1722) and Qajar (1796-1925) periods, Digard noted how tobacco's diffusion was facilitated by early 17th-century Safavid-Ottoman wars, making the qalyān (water pipe) an emblematic instrument of tabacomania by mid-century, while coffee imported from Yemen in the late 16th century led to the first mentions of qahve-khāne (coffeehouses) in 1597. For the Qajar period, he emphasized the major shift from coffee to tea consumption accomplished by the late 19th century, which favored the reemergence of coffeehouses that paradoxically served only tea, marking the consecration of the samovar's use.

Dirk van Delft praised Matthee's work as "a rich study" based on extensive archival material, noting that while the beautifully illustrated Princeton University Press edition targeted a broader audience than specialists, it occasionally risked overwhelming general readers with excessive detail. Van Delft highlighted the book's striking opening observation that by the late sixteenth century, Iran was the first country outside America and Spain where smoking was widespread, with Iranian workers spending their daily wages first on tobacco before bread and fruit, and where a seventeenth-century saying equated coffee without tobacco to soup without salt. He noted Matthee's position as a leading figure in the scholarly shift from studying classical Persian poetry (Rumi, Hafez, Omar Khayyam) toward socio-economic history, following his earlier work mapping seventeenth-century Iranian silk trade. Van Delft emphasized the book's examination of tensions between secular and religious authority regarding wine, opium, tobacco, coffee, and tea, particularly highlighting how the ulama's attempts to ban tobacco faced difficulties due to the Quran's silence on the subject and lost tax revenues, while the clergy itself included many addicts. The reviewer found particularly compelling Matthee's demonstration of how court alcohol consumption under the Safavids shifted from public to private domains, how opium smoking became a social plague in the late nineteenth century when it replaced ingestion, and how coffeehouses served crucial social functions despite authorities' repeated attempts to suppress them as potential centers of unrest. Van Delft cited Matthee's observation that the historical relationship between secular and religious authority in Iran from 1500-1900 underwent major fluctuations, with Shi'ite clerics often turning a blind eye to private consumption that didn't threaten social order—"a flexibility," Matthee notes, "that is still visible beneath the unbending exterior of the current Islamic Republic."

Stephan Conermann praised Matthee's work as an "excellent book" and "remarkably successful monograph," highlighting how the author expanded his earlier substantive essays on tea, coffee, and tobacco use in Iran from the 1990s into this comprehensive study. Conermann emphasized Matthee's extensive archival research across Dutch, British, Austrian, French, Belgian, and Iranian archives, combined with thorough examination of Persian historiographical literature and careful reading of reports from European travelers, diplomats, and merchants, resulting in "an insightful and pioneering study" of drugs and stimulants in Iran from 1500 to 1925. The reviewer identified as a central finding the "obvious discrepancy between the idealized conception of life formulated by religious scholars on one hand and the complex, boundary-free, control-resistant real life on the other," noting that the Safavid state structure was fundamentally secular-oriented despite needing to balance religious principles with profit-seeking necessities. Conermann highlighted the dialectical relationship where the ulama reminded rulers of their duty to enforce Islamic norms publicly while being content when authorities limited themselves to sporadic measures, allowing everyone to perform technically forbidden actions "undisturbed and without bad conscience." He particularly appreciated Matthee's conclusion that Islam demands not so much inner proofs of faith but publicly practiced rituals and behaviors, which "leaves room for a private sphere in which Sharia need not necessarily be followed, as long as no other person is harmed and things remain within one's own four walls." This attitude, Matthee argues, "has always made life liveable in Muslim societies, allowing people to behave as they wished while maintaining the pretense that society continued to pursue that ideal."

Jorge Flores praised Matthee's work as neither "a concession to the fashion of historical product biographies nor a strictly economic analysis" but rather a holistic approach capable of combining material culture studies with social relations, religious practices, and political transformations. Flores emphasized how by "giving voice to two intoxicating substances (wine, opium) and three stimulants (tobacco, coffee, tea), Matthee succeeds in composing an interesting global picture of Iran in the 16th-19th centuries." The reviewer highlighted several key ideas, including the fundamental paradox that wine, "although formally forbidden, played an important role in society, its rituals, and its conventions," while opium remained free of social and religious stigmas until becoming a problem requiring control in the late 19th century. Flores particularly valued how the book dismantles commonplaces about Iran and the Islamic world, noting its timeliness given growing tensions between Bush's America and Ahmadinejad's Iran, calling it "excellent prophylaxis" for stereotypes and "particularly recommended reading for politicians, diplomats, international relations specialists and opinion makers who often assume that the utility of the past and History's examples stops at the 20th century." He emphasized Matthee's demonstration of a dynamic society where "Safavid Iran reveals itself as a society that mixed the sacred and the profane, where pleasure and proscription were not mutually exclusive, and in which long-standing habits – and economic imperatives – usually won out over moral considerations."
