= Moshtari Khanum =

Iranian royal consort (c. 1786 – c. 1883)

- Born: c. 1786; Shiraz, Zand Iran
- Died: c. 1883 (aged 97); Tehran, Qajar Iran
- Spouse: Fath-Ali Shah Qajar
- Issue: Habbeh Nabat Khanum; Pasha Khanum; Mohammad Mehdi Mirza; Farzaneh Beigom Khanum; Mohammad-Amin Mirza; Mehr Jahan Khanum; Mohammad Hadi Mirza
- Persian: (مشتری باجی) مشتری خانم
- Dynasty: Qajar (by marriage)
- Occupation: Musician, Singer, and Dancer

Moshtari Khanum (Persian: مشتری خانم; c. 1786 – c. 1883), also known as Moshtari Baji (Persian: مشتری باجی) was one of the consorts of Fath-Ali Shah Qajar. She was a musician, singer, and dancer in the Shah’s court. She gave birth to twelve of the Shah's children, seven of whom lived to adulthood.

== Early life ==
In about 1786, she was born in Shiraz, Fars province, Zand Iran to an artist family.

== Marriage ==
Fath-Ali Shah Qajar, in 52 years starting from his puberty until death, married many times. The selection process mostly was that a number of his confidants were sent to various locations in Iran to select girls who had a pretty face and a silver body, i.e., a white, glowing, and beautiful body, from every religion and ethnicity and bring them to the Shah's court. These wives include the ones from noble and renowned families, the well-known skillful artists, and other lesser known or unknown artists and servants. Moshtari Khanum was among the well-known skillful artists who married the Shah in about 1803 as one of his temporary wives.

== Fath-Ali Shah's court ==
She was a musician, singer, and dancer in Fath-Ali Shah’s court. Her voice could be heard from the Qajar Palace, located around three kilometers from the court in Tehran. On spring and summer nights, her voice was reaching the residents of the city, including the historian, Khavari, himself. In addition to her voice, Moshtari Khanum played the Setar, while dancing and making moves to captivate and mesmerize the Shah.

About her voice, Khavari wrote that: "Moshtari Khanum's pleasant voice brings the memory of the Davidic voice and puts the reputation of the nightingale with one thousand tales on the shelf of forgetfulness."

== Shah's last trip ==
Every time Fath-Ali Shah was preparing to go on a trip, while he was wearing his boots and pants, Moshtari Khanum had to be singing to him.

In 1834, at the beginning of the Shah's last trip, in which he was travelling to Isfahan, she sang this verse to the Shah in Persian that can be interpreted as: "You traveled and all the good ones pulled out their hair; due to your departure, surprisingly dynasties fell apart." The Shah perceived the verse as a bad omen, severely influenced by it, and said: "We are from God and we will return to Him." Coincidently, the Shah died in the same trip.

== Children ==
Moshtari Khanum gave birth to twelve children of Fath-Ali Shah, five of which died in childhood. Their remaining seven children are listed below in an interactive sortable table (sorted by birthdate). The table's denotations are:

- S: Son
- D: Daughter

Children
No.	S/D	Name	Title	Birth	Death	Spouse(s)	Notes
1	D	Habbeh Nabat Khanum		c. 1804		Amir Kabir Mirza Mohammad Khan	Mohammad Khan was a son of Hossein-Qoli Khan (Fath-Ali Shah's brother). She was his second wife; they separated.
2	D	Pasha Khanum		c. 1806		Sohrab Khan Gorji	Sohrab Khan was Fath-Ali Shah's treasurer. She was his second wife.
3	S	Mohammad Mehdi Mirza	Zargam-ol-Molk	1808		A daughter of Amir Khan Ezzodinloo Qajar; A lady from Tehran; A daughter of Mehr-Ali Khan (a son of Morteza Qoli Khan, Fath-Ali Shah's uncle)	
4	D	Farzaneh Beigom Khanum		c. 1817		Hossein-Ali Khan Moayyer-ol-Mamalek	She married in 1833. Hossein-Ali Khan (1798-1858) was in the mint industry, i.e. coin manufacturer.
5	S	Mohammad-Amin Mirza		1819	1886		Mohammad Amin Mirza was the governor of the following cities: Malayer and Tuyserkan (1868-1869); Kamareh (1870-1874); Golpayegan and Khansar (1874-1886)
6	D	Mehr Jahan Khanum				Zein-ol-Abedin Khan Yuz Bashi	Zeinol Abedin Khan was a commander of 100 cavalrymen and son of Ghasem Hezar Jaribi (the head of servants).
7	S	Mohammad Hadi Mirza		1832	1897		

== Death ==
She lived a very happy life; and even in later years, joyfulness was apparent from her face. No one ever saw her sad or depressed. She lived nearly 97 years and died in about 1883.
