= Battle of Baneh (1777) =

1777 battle

- Part of Ottoman–Persian War (1776–1779)
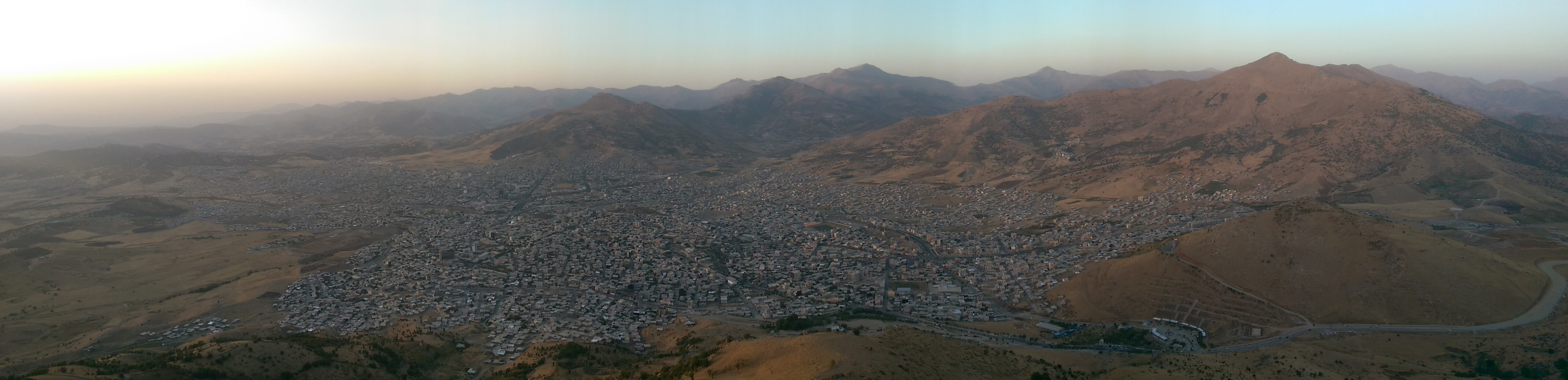
- Baneh
Date	22 April 1777
Location	Baneh, present-day Iran
Result	Ottoman victory

Belligerents
Ottoman Empire	Zand Iran

Commanders and leaders
Mehmed Pasha; Ahmad Pasha	Saleh Khan

Casualties and losses
Unknown	Heavy

The Battle of Baneh was a battle in the Ottoman–Persian War (1776–1779). On April 22, 1777, an Ottoman force under the command of Mehmed Pasha, the governor of Baban inflicted a defeat on the Persian army under Saleh Khan, the governor of Ardalan under the Zand Dynasty, at Baneh.

== Background ==
Following the Zand dynasty's attack on the Baban Sanjak in Iran in 1774 and its siege and occupation of Basra on April 16, 1776, the Ottoman Empire declared war on Iran on May 2, 1776.

== Battle ==
In the spring of 1777, the Ottomans attacked Ardalan from Baban. At the end of 1776, Karim Khan's commander, Nazar Ali Khan, had withdrawn from Kermanshah to the capital, Shiraz.

Meanwhile, the troops that Abdullah Pasha, the governor of Baghdad who had been appointed Serasker, was supposed to send, had not yet reached Baban by the spring of 1777.

Therefore, Hasan Pasha, the governor of Kirkuk and Shahrizor, launched an attack via the Mosul front without waiting for Abdullah Pasha and with permission from the Ottoman capital. Hasan Pasha assigned duties to Baban Mehmed Pasha, the governor of the Baban Sanjak, and his brother, Baban Ahmed Pasha, the governor of the Köy and Harir Sanjak, within the forces under his command. He sent Ahmed Pasha from the Zohab column towards Kermanshah, and Mehmed Pasha from Kara Çulan towards Sanandaj. However, this time the situation was the opposite of that of 1774; while Ahmed Pasha defected to the Iranian side, Mehmed Pasha obeyed the order and advanced towards Baneh with the troops under his command.

On April 22, the Ottoman unit encountered the troops of Saleh Khan, the Iranian governor of Baneh. After a three-hour battle, the Ottoman unit defeated the Iranian provincial army. Then they invaded Baneh and advanced towards Sanandaj.

== Aftermath ==
Baban Mehmed Pasha's victory against the Iranian corps on April 21 shocked Iran's military position in the region. To halt the advance of the Ottoman forces into Iranian territory, Khosrow Khan, the governor of Sine and one of Karim Khan's most valuable commanders, launched an offensive. However, in the Battle of Sanandaj on May 5th, the Iranian army suffered an defeat.

== Sources ==
- Aksun, Ziya Nur (1994). Osmanlı Tarihi. Istanbul: Ötüken Yayınları. ISBN 9754371458.
- Perry, John R. (2015). Karim Khan Zand: A History of Iran, 1747–1779. University of Chicago Press. ISBN 978-0-226-66102-5.
- Perry, John R. (1979). Karim Khan Zand: A History of Iran (1747-1779). University of Chicago Press. ISBN 9780226661025.
