= Khosrow II of Ardalan =

Governor of Kurdistan from 1754 to 1788

Khosrow Khan was the Ardalan vali (governor) of Kurdistan from 1754 to 1788/89.

He gave the Zand ruler Karim Khan Zand (r. 1751–1779) his complete backing. He was defeated by an Ottoman force in April 1777, but later that year took part in Karim Khan Zand's successful expedition against the Ottomans. Following Karim Khan's death in 1779, there was a period of disorder during which Khosrow Khan triumphed over two claimants to the Iranian throne: Allahqoli Khan Zanganeh near the Ardalan capital of Sanandaj, and Jafar Khan Zand at Bahar. Khosrow Khan established his authority over much land, including Malayer and Golpayegan. When he saw that the Qajar ruler Agha Mohammad Khan Qajar was the most prominent candidate to the throne, he shifted his allegiance to him. During the 1760s, Khosrow Khan had a sizable palace named Khosroviya built in Sanandaj.

== Sources ==
- Oberling, P. (1988). "Banī Ardalān". In Yarshater, Ehsan (ed.). Encyclopædia Iranica. Vol. III/7: Banān–Bardesanes. London and New York: Routledge & Kegan Paul. pp. 693–694. ISBN 978-0-71009-119-2.
