= Rostam al-Tavarikh =

Persian historical chronicle (1800)

Rostam al-Tavarikh (Persian: رستم‌التواریخ) is a Persian-language historical chronicle that covers the end of the Safavid era to the early rule of Fath-Ali Shah Qajar (r. 1797–1834) in the Qajar era. It was composed in 1800 by Rostam al-Hokama, who belonged to a family with a history of service under the Safavid shahs.

== Sources ==
- Fereshteh, Majidi (2018). "رستم التواریخ". The Great Islamic Encyclopaedia (in Persian).
- Perry, John R. (1979). Karim Khan Zand: A History of Iran, 1747–1779. University of Chicago Press. ISBN 978-0226660981.
