= Halo Khan Ardalan =

Ardalan ruler

Halo Khan Ardalan (also rendered Halu Khan; Kurdish: Helo Xan/ھەڵۆ خان) was a ruler of the Kurdish Ardalan principality from 1590 to 1616. He governed during the continuing rivalry between Safavid Iran and the Ottoman Empire, maintaining substantial autonomy while cultivating relations with both courts.

== Rule ==
The early nineteenth-century dynastic chronicle translated by historian Sara Zandi Karimi identifies Halo Khan as the son of Sultanalī Beg. It records that he took power in AH 998 (1590), with authority over Ardalan, Shahrizor, Koy, Harir, and other towns. According to the chronicle, after two years he ceased serving either the Safavid shah or the Ottoman sultan and ruled independently. It also credits him with bringing the fortresses of Zolm and Palangan under his authority.

Shah Abbas I nevertheless sought to bind Ardalan more closely to the Safavid state. A study in Iranian Studies states that Abbas demanded an oath of allegiance from Halo Khan, who sent his son Khan Ahmad Khan to the Safavid court as proof of his loyalty. The arrangement provided the Safavids with an assurance of Ardalan loyalty while giving the ruling family access to the court, allowing Safavid centralization to affect the dynasty more gradually than it did some other regional ruling houses.

Khan Ahmad was raised at Shah Abbas's court and was sent to Ardalan in 1615 to assume the governorship from his ailing father. The Ardalan chronicle dates the formal succession to 1616, when Shah Abbas replaced Halo Khan with his son. It records that Halo Khan was then received at the royal court in Isfahan, while Khan Ahmad took control of Ardalan and its associated territories.
