= Mirza Fazlollah Khavari Shirazi =

- Born: 1776–1785; Shiraz, Zand Iran
- Died: 1849/50; Shiraz, Qajar Iran
- Occupations: Historian and poet
- Writing career
- Language: Persian
- Notable work: Tarikh-e Zu'l-Qarneyn

Mirza Fazlollah Khavari Shirazi (Persian: میرزا فضل الله خاوری شیرازی) was a historian and poet in Qajar Iran, who composed the Tarikh-e Zu'l-Qarneyn, an important chronicle for early Qajar history.

A native of Shiraz, he was born between 1776 and 1785. His father was Mirza Abdonabi Sharifi-Hosseini and his mother was the daughter of Agha Mohammad Hashem Zahabi. He died in 1849/50 in Shiraz, where he was buried. 15,000 couplets of qasidas and ghazals make up his divan (collection of poems) named Mehr-e Khavari.

== Sources ==
- Afsharfar, Naser. "خاوری شیرازی میرزا فضل الله". Encyclopaedia Islamica Foundation (in Persian).
