= Qarahdagh District =

Qarahdagh District قەزای قەرەداغ Arabic: قضاء قرة داغ
- District
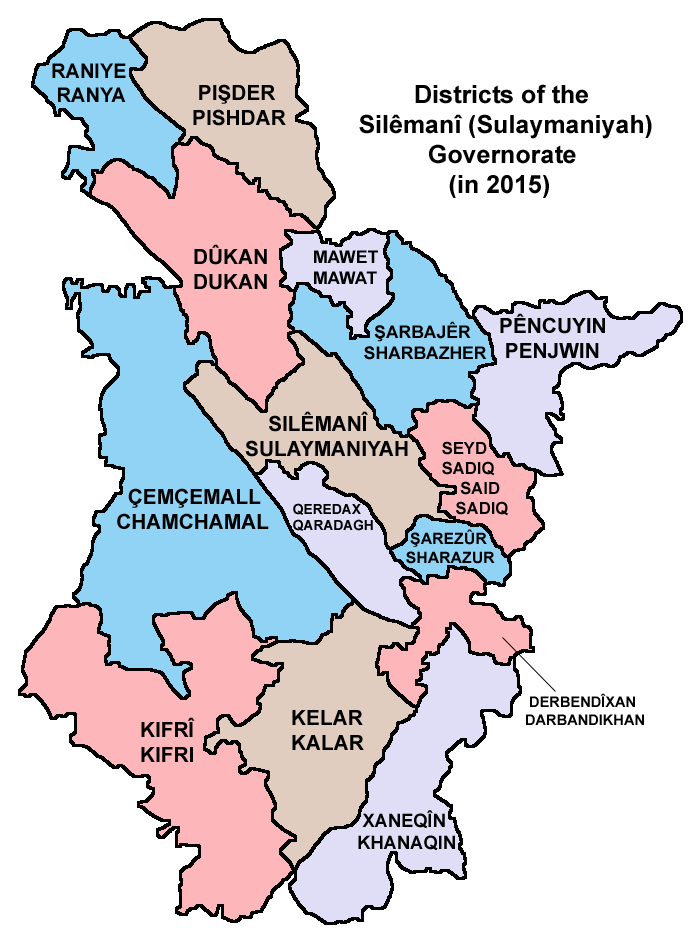
- Districts of the Sulaymaniyah Governorate

- Location within Iraqi Kurdistan Location within Iraq
- Coordinates: 35.30061°N 45.40467°E
- Country: Iraq
- Region: Kurdistan Region
- Governorate: Sulaymaniyah
- Seat: Qaradagh

The Qarahdagh District (Arabic: قضاء قرة داغ; Sorani Kurdish: قەزای قەرەداغ, romanized: Qezay Qeredax) is a district of Sulaymaniyah Governorate in Kurdistan Region, Iraq. The district is populated by Kurds. Its main town is Qarahdagh.

== History ==
Qarahdagh was a mountainous district south of Sulaymaniyah that enjoyed de facto autonomy during much of the Ottoman period. Owing to its rugged terrain and strong tribal structure, the region was governed largely by local Kurdish aghas, most prominently leaders of the Jaf tribal confederation. Although formally incorporated into the Ottoman provincial system, Qarahdagh functioned with considerable internal independence, including local tax collection and maintenance of armed forces, in exchange for nominal loyalty to the Ottoman state.

The area developed within the broader political sphere of the Emirate of Baban, which exercised regional influence from the 17th to the mid-19th century. During the Tanzimat reforms of the 19th century, the Ottoman government sought to centralize administration and curtail hereditary tribal authority, leading to a gradual reduction of Qarahdagh's autonomy. Nevertheless, effective central control remained limited due to geography and entrenched tribal power, and the region retained a semi-autonomous character into the late Ottoman era.
