= Ottoman–Persian War (1776–1779) =

Armed conflict in the Middle East

Ottoman–Persian War of 1776–1779
- Part of the Ottoman–Persian Wars
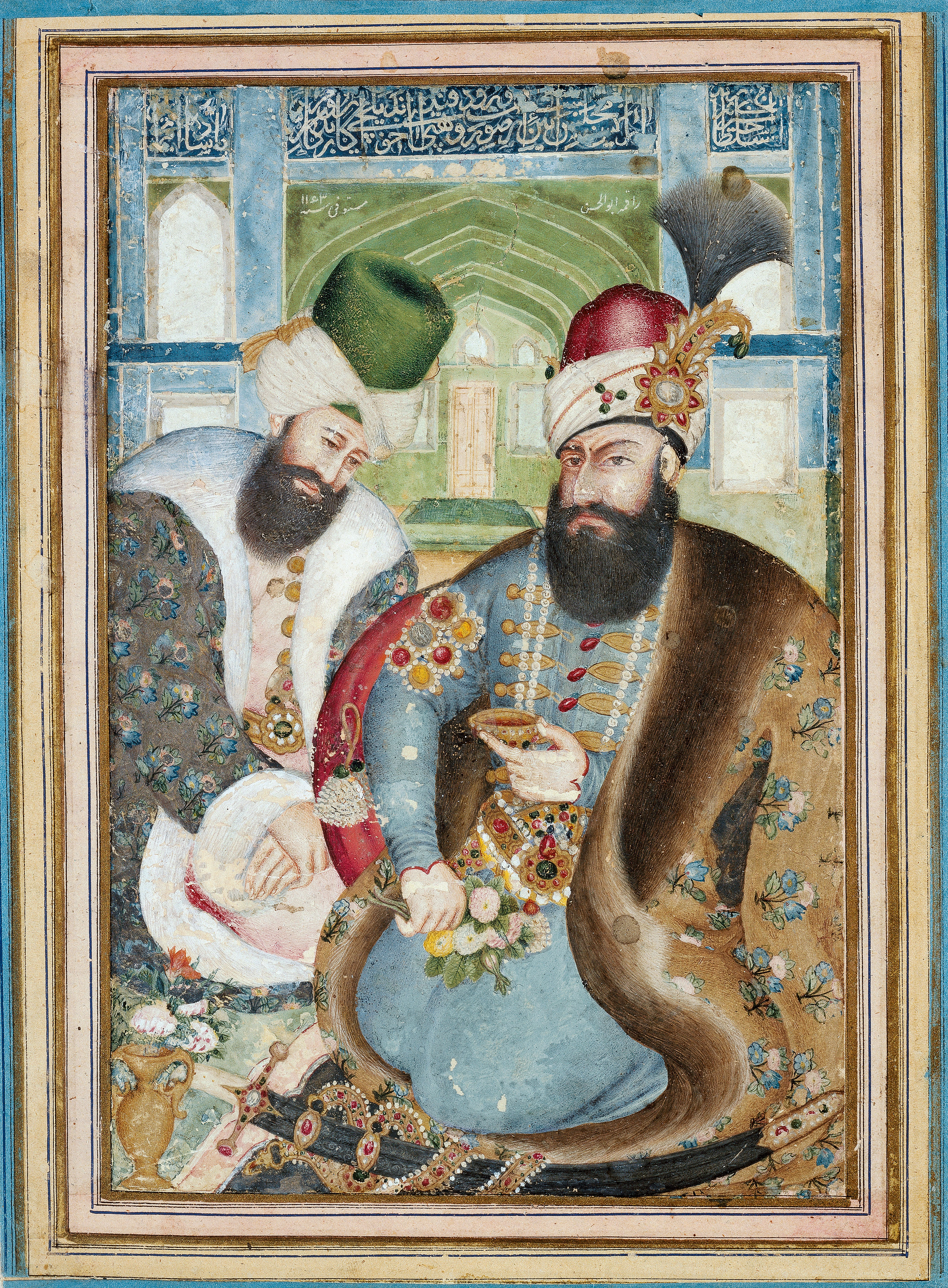
- Karim Khan Zand with the Ottoman envoy Vehbi Efendi.
Date	1776–1779
Location	Ottoman Iraq
Result	Inconclusive
Territorial changes	Basra captured by the Zands for three years.

Belligerents
Zand Iran; Velayat of Ardalan	Ottoman Empire; Pashalik of Iraq; Omani Empire

Commanders and leaders
Karim Khan Zand; Sadeq Khan Zand; Khosrow Khan Bozorgi	Abdul Hamid I Suleiman al-Jalili; Soleyman Aqa

The Ottoman–Persian War of 1776–1779 or Ottoman–Iranian War of 1776–1779 was fought between the Ottoman Empire and Zand Iran. The Iranians, ruled by Karim Khan Zand and led by his brother Sadeq Khan Zand, invaded southern Iraq and after besieging Basra for a year, took the city from the Ottomans in 1776. The Ottomans, unable to send troops, were dependent on the Mamluk governors to defend that region.

In an attempt to raise troops and provisions for this war, Ottoman Sultan Abdul Hamid I, made Suleiman al-Jalili mubayaaci (official of provisions), ordering him to send provisions to Baghdad, which he ignored, instead restricting merchants from selling their goods. As a result, the Iranians held Basra until Karim Khan's death in 1779 when the Ottomans, under Sulayman Agha, retook the city.

== Background ==
There were multiple reasons for why Karim Khan declared war on the Ottoman Empire. Omar Pasha the Mamluk governor of the Ottoman province of Iraq had seized the remnants of Iranian pilgrims who had died during the plague that ravaged Iraq in 1773 and his exaction of payment from Iranian pilgrims to visit the holy Shia places of Najaf and Karbala. Another reason was the city of Mashhad where the Imam Reza shrine was situated, was not under Zand control, thus the access to free shrines in Iraq was important to Karim Khan.

Omar Pasha also began to interfere more in the internal affairs of the Baban Emirate, which had recently shown closeness to Khosrow Khan, the Governor of Ardalan under the Zand Dynasty, and finally dismissed Mehmed Pasha the ruler of Baban at the beginning of 1774 and appointed Abdullah Pasha in his place. Mehmed Pasha took refuge in Ardalan.

Most importantly, Basra was a prominent trading port, which had surpassed the competing city of Bushehr in Fars in 1769, when the East India Company dropped the city for Basra.

In October 1774 a force under Ali-Morad Khan Zand was sent to restore Mehmed Pasha to Baban, while a second army held ready to march on Basra. Ali Morad collected further reinforcements on his way through Ardalan and arrived about early November in the region of Qara Chowalan with an army of ten to twelve thousand men. Ahmed Pasha (brother of Mehmed Pasha) took over the administration of Baban, and defeated the Persian army with his unit of 3,000 soldiers. The Persian army suffered 4,000-5,000 deaths and 10-12 officers captured in addition to the commander. Ali Morad was taken to Baghdad, where Omar Pasha was unwilling to precipitate in a direct conflict with Karim Khan Zand. Ali Morad was able to escape with nothing worse than a tongue-lashing.

== Siege of Basra ==
The Zand forces under Ali-Morad Khan Zand and Nazar Ali Khan Zand clashed with the Pasha's forces in Kurdistan with an army of 1,000, where they kept them at bay, whilst Sadeq Khan, with an army of 30,000, besieged Basra in April 1775. The Arab tribe al-Muntafiq, which was allied with the governor of Basra, quickly withdrew without any effort to reject Sadeq Khan from passing through the Shatt al-Arab, whilst the Banu Ka'b and the Arabs of Bushehr supplied Sadeq Khan with boats and supplies.

Suleiman Agha, who was the commander of the fort of Basra, resisted Sadeq Khan's forces, which made Sadeq Khan to establish an encirclement. A few months later, in October, a group of ships from Oman gave supplies and military aid to Basra. Their combined attack the next day occurred to be wavering, the Omani ships eventually chose to withdraw back to Muscat during winter, in order to avoid further losses.

In February 1775, before the announcement of the siege of Basra had reached Constantinople, and while the Zagros front was temporarily peaceful, the Ottoman ambassador, Vehbi Efendi, was sent to Shiraz. He reached Shiraz around the same time Sadeq Khan besieged Basra, "but was not empowered to negotiate over this new crisis."

Reinforcements from Baghdad arrived shortly afterwards, which was repelled by the Khaza'il, a Shia Arab tribe which was allied with the Zand forces. In the spring of 1776, the encirclement by Sadeq Khan had resulted in the defenders being on the fringe of famine, a considerable portion of the Basra forces had deserted Suleiman Agha, whilst the rumours of a possible uprising, made Suleiman Agha surrender on 16 April 1776.

== Ottoman counter-attack (1777) ==
Late in 1776, Nazar Ali Khan Zand unexpectedly withdrew his whole force from Kermanshah and returned to Shiraz. Hasan Pasha of Mardin was appointed to raise an army in Kirkuk and Mosul to restore Ottoman supremacy in Kurdistan. Reinforcements from Baghdad were delayed due to Abdollah Pasha's still precarious hold over the center, Hasan Pasha launched an early spring offensive against Ardalan with his own levies and the Baban troops, under the field command of Mohammad Pasha and Mehmed Pasha, who had rejoined the Ottoman ranks also joined the Baban advance. On 22 April 1777 Mohammad defeated the Governor of Bane, Saleh Khan in the Battle of Bane. Khosraw Khan hasted to stop Mohammad Pasha’s army and on 5 May 1777 Mohammad Pasha defeated the Zand army at Marivan and Sanandaj, losing 2,000-3,000 soldiers. The Zands' response was to plunder the area around Mosul with a unit under the command of Kelb-i Ali Khan.

== See also ==
- Safavid occupation of Basra
- Ottoman–Persian Wars

== Sources ==
- Jaques, Tony (30 November 2006). Dictionary of Battles and Sieges: A Guide to 8,500 Battles from Antiquity Through the Twenty-first Century [3 Volumes]. Bloomsbury Academic. ISBN 9780313335365.
- Fisher, William Bayne; Avery, P.; Hambly, G. R. G; Melville, C. (1991). The Cambridge History of Iran. Vol. 7. Cambridge: Cambridge University Press. ISBN 0521200954.
- Hala Mundhir, Fattah (1997). The Politics of Regional Trade in Iraq, Arabia, and the Gulf: 1745-1900. SUNY Press. ISBN 9781438402376.
- Perry, John R. (2011). "Karim Khan Zand". Encyclopaedia Iranica, Vol. XV, Fasc. 6. pp. 561–564.
- Perry, John R. (2010). "Zand dynasty". Encyclopaedia Iranica, Vol. XV, Fasc. 6.
- Perry, John R. (2015). Karim Khan Zand: A History of Iran, 1747–1779. University of Chicago Press. ISBN 978-0-226-66102-5.
- Pasha, Ahmed Cevdet (1991). Tarih-i Cevdet. Vol. 2. Ankara: Turkish Historical Society. ISBN 978-975-16-3444-3.
- John, Sir, Malcolm (1815). The history of Persia, from the most early period to the present time containing an account of the religion, government, usages, and character of the inhabitants of that kingdom. Vol. 2. London : Murray. ISBN 978-1-4021-5205-4.
- John, Sir, Malcolm (2004). The history of Persia, from the most early period to the present time containing an account of the religion, government, usages, and character of the inhabitants of that kingdom. Vol. 1. London : Murray: Adamant Media Corporation. ISBN 978-1-4021-5134-7.
- al-Hamid, Abd; Baysun, M. Cavid; Gibb, H.A.R.; Karmaers, J.H.; Levi-Provencal, E.; Schacht, J. (1986). "The Encyclopaedia of Islam". Encyclopaedia of Islam, Volume: 1. Brill.
- Perry, John (1991). "The Zand dynasty". The Cambridge History of Iran, Vol. 7: From Nadir Shah to the Islamic Republic. Cambridge: Cambridge University Press. pp. 63–104. ISBN 9780521200950.
- Frye, Richard N. (2009). "Zand Dynasty". The Oxford Encyclopedia of the Islamic World. Oxford University Press. ISBN 978-0-19-530513-5.
- Garthwaite, Gene R. (2005). The Persians. Wiley. pp. 1–311. ISBN 9781557868602.
- Shaw, Stanford (1991). "Iranian relations with the Ottoman Empire in the eighteenth and nineteenth centuries". The Cambridge History of Iran, Vol. 7: From Nadir Shah to the Islamic Republic. Cambridge: Cambridge University Press. pp. 297–314. ISBN 9780521200950.
- Hasan, Mohibbul (2005). Waqai-i manazil-i Rum: Tipu Sultan's mission to Constantinople. Aakar Books. ISBN 9788187879565.
- Rizk Khoury, Dina (2002). State and Provincial Society in the Ottoman Empire: Mosul, 1540-1834. Cambridge University Press. ISBN 9780521590600.
- A. Agius, Dionisius (January 2010). In the Wake of the Dhow: The Arabian Gulf and Oman. Ithaca Press. ISBN 978-0-86372-341-4.
