= Ardalan =

Kurdish dynasty (14th century-1865/1868)

Principality of Ardalan میرنشینی ئەردەڵان
- 14th century–1865/68
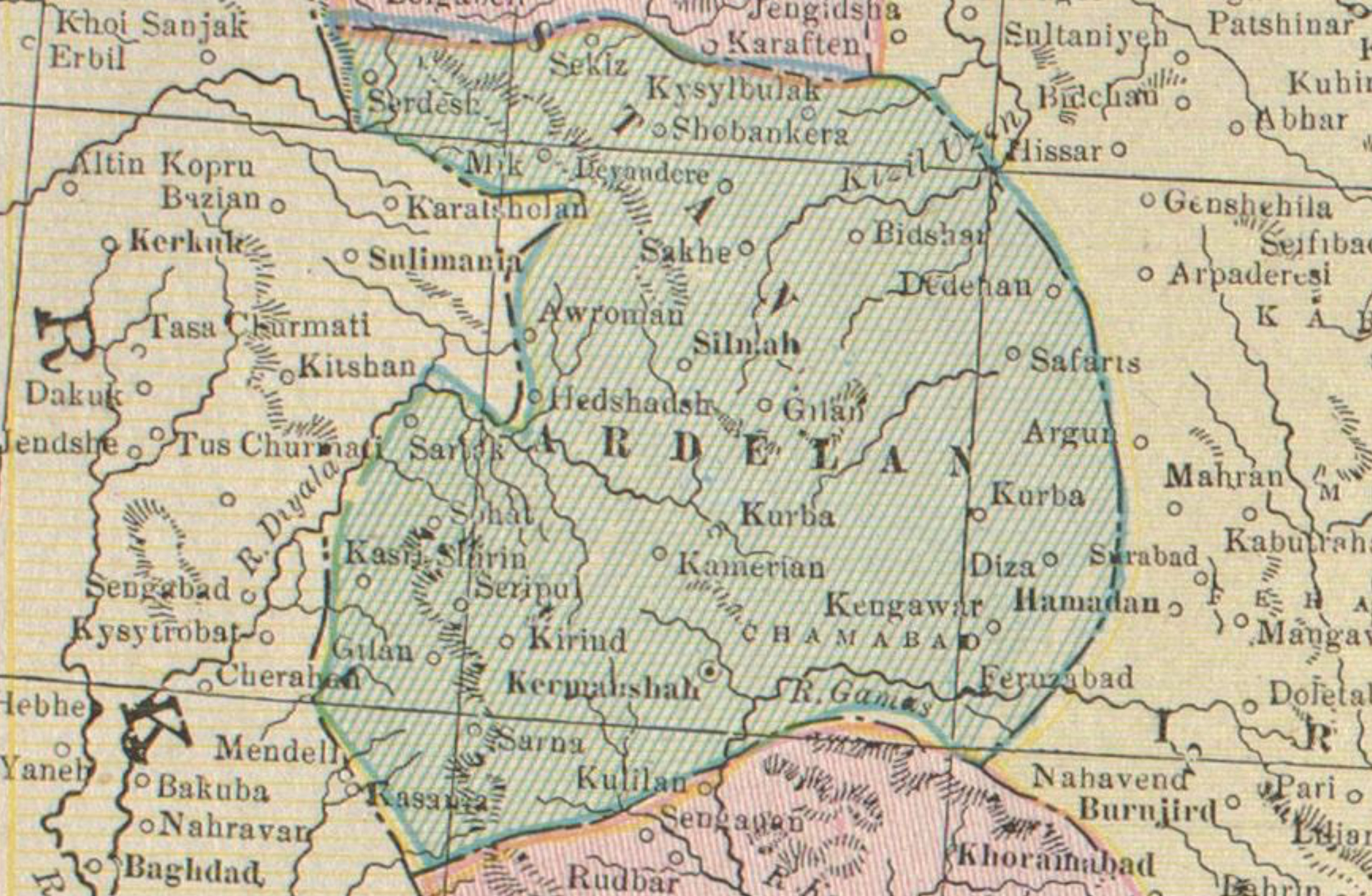
- Ardalan in the Cram's Family Atlas map, 19th century
- Status: Independent emirate (14th century-1617), semi-independent (1617-1865/68)
- Capital: Sanandaj
- Common languages: Gorani, Kurdish
- Government: Principality
- Wali
  - ?-?: Bani Ardalan
  - 1846–1848 1860–1867: Amanollah Khan Ardalan (last)
- History
  - Established: 14th century
  - Disestablished: 1865/68
Succeeded by
Qajar Iran
- Today part of: Kurdistan Province

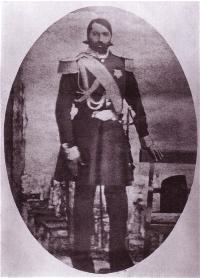
Amanollah Khan Ardalan, Wali of Ardalan (1846–1848, 1860–1867)

Ardalan (Sorani Kurdish: ئەردەڵان, Persian: اردلان), also known as the Ardalanids, the House of Ardalan, the Ardalanid dynasty, or Ardalanid Kurdistan (Persian: کردستان اردلان, romanized: Kurdistân-e Ardalân), was a hereditary Kurdish Emirate in western Iran from around the 14th century until 1865 or 1868 with Sanandaj as capital. The Ardalan state was completely independent until 1617, when it was incorporated into the Safavid Empire as a semi-independent frontier province by the name of Ardalan. The territory corresponded roughly to present-day Kurdistan province of Iran and its rulers were loyal to Qajar Iran. Baban was its main rival. Gorani was its literary language and lingua franca. When the Ardalan emirate fell, literary work in Gorani ceased.

== History ==
=== Origins ===
The ruling family of Ardalan belonged to the Ardalan tribe, also known as Bani Ardalan tribe, whose name may has been suggested to have been acquired from a Turkic rank. The ruling family considered themselves to be descended from Saladin (r. 1174–1193), the founder of the Ayyubid dynasty (1171–1260/1341). Some Ardalan monarchs claimed descent from Ardashir I, the founder of the Sasanian Empire. Other tribal folklore traced their foundation to the early Abbasid Caliphate (750–1258). According to Sharafkhan Bidlisi, the renowned Kurdish historian, the earliest known leader of the tribe, Bani Ardalan, was a descendant of Nasr al-Dawla Ahmad ibn Marwan, who was the ruler of Marwanid Emirate in 1011–1061 centered in Diyar Bakr. He settled down among the Goran Kurds in Kurdistan and toward the end of the Mongol era took over the Sharazor, where he established himself as an absolute ruler.

=== Ardalan emirate ===
The Ardalan emirate was independent from its foundation by Baba Ardalan until it became Semi-independent in 1617, when Ahmad khan took the throne. From the Beginning of Ahmad Khan's reign till Amanoallah Khan, the Ardalan emirate was mostly a Semi-independent country. They recognized Iranian or Ottoman hegemony according to the requirements of each period.

During the Safavid hegemony, the Ardalans were deeply involved in the conflicts between the Iranian and Ottoman empires, they shifted their Allegiance to the Ottomans whenever it suited them. By 1736, Nader Shah had overthrown the Safavid dynasty and started expanding the borders of Iran both to the east and west. He fought numerous wars against the Ottoman Empire from the start of his reign until his death in June 1747. Some of the lands controlled by the Kurdish rulers were repeatedly transferred during these battles. The Ottomans and Nader Shah occupied Ardalan more than any other of those regions. In addition to these states, Ardalan was also invaded by the principalities of Mukriyan, Baban, and Shahrizor.

Soon after Nader Shah's assassination, Karim Khan Zand became the new ruler of Iran. He gained control over most of the country, and before the winter of 1749, had launched a military operation against Ardalan. Its ruler, Hasan Ali, attempted to diffuse the conflict despite his lack of preparation, but failed. The Zand army destroyed his capital, Sanandaj. Kurdish rulers were never awarded important posts in the Zand dynasty's administrative hierarchy, such as the office of beglerbegi (governor-general). Hereditary positions required royal approval, and Karim Khan did not always acknowledge the rulers those who were in line to take over their inherited domains.

== Literature ==
Under Halo Khan Ardalan and his successor Khan Ahmad Khan Ardalan, the towns of Ardalan were restored. They also supported writers and poets who wrote in Arabic, Persian, and especially Gorani, a language that was far more spoken than it is now.

== See also ==
- Soleyman Khan Ardalan
- List of Kurdish dynasties and countries
- List of Kurdish castles

== Sources ==
- Atmaca, Metin (2021). "Negotiating Political Power in the Early Modern Middle East: Kurdish Emirates between the Ottoman Empire and Iranian Dynasties (Sixteenth to Nineteenth Centuries)". In Bozarslan, Hamit; Gunes, Cengiz; Yadirgi, Veli (eds.). The Cambridge History of the Kurds. Cambridge University Press. ISBN 978-1108473354.
- Blau, Joyce (2010). "Written Kurdish literature". In Kreyenbroek, Philip G.; Marzolph, Ulrich (eds.). Oral Literature of Iranian Languages Kurdish, Pashto, Balochi, Ossetic, Persian and Tajik. I.B. Tauris. pp. 1–31. ISBN 978-1845119188.
- Floor, Willem (2008). Titles and Emoluments in Safavid Iran: A Third Manual of Safavid Administration, by Mirza Naqi Nasiri. Washington, D.C.: Mage Publishers. ISBN 978-1933823232.
- Frye, R.N. (1960). "Ardalān". In Gibb, H. A. R.; Kramers, J. H.; Lévi-Provençal, E.; Schacht, J.; Lewis, B. & Pellat, Ch. (eds.). The Encyclopaedia of Islam, Second Edition. Volume I: A–B. Leiden: E. J. Brill. p. 626. OCLC 495469456.
- Matthee, Rudi (2011). Persia in Crisis: Safavid Decline and the Fall of Isfahan. I.B.Tauris. ISBN 978-0857731814.
- Matthee, Rudi (2015). "Relations between the Center and the Periphery in Safavid Iran: The Western Borderlands v. the Eastern Frontier Zone". The Historian. 77 (3): 431–463. doi:10.1111/hisn.12068. S2CID 143393018.
- Oberling, P. (1988). "Banī Ardalān". In Yarshater, Ehsan (ed.). Encyclopædia Iranica. Vol. III/7: Banān–Bardesanes. London and New York: Routledge & Kegan Paul. pp. 693–694. ISBN 978-0-71009-119-2.
