= Rudi Matthee =

American historian (born 1953)

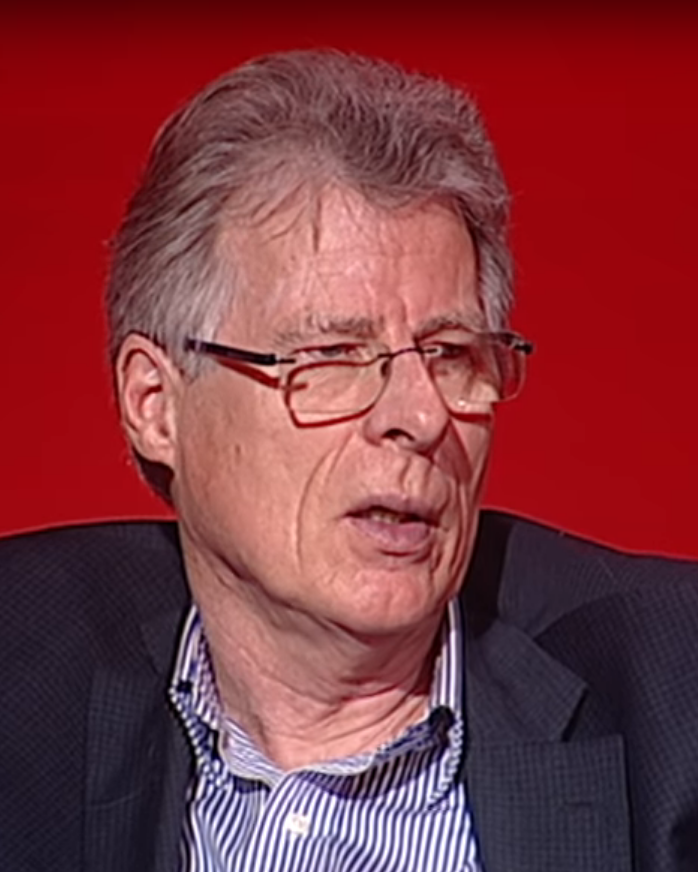
- Matthee in 2018

Academic background
- Education: University of California, Los Angeles (PhD)
- Thesis: Politics and Trade in Late Safavid Iran: Commercial Crisis and Government Reaction Under Shah Solayman (1666-1694) (1991)
- Doctoral advisor: Nikki Keddie

Academic work
- Discipline: History
- Institutions: University of Delaware

Rudolph P. Matthee, best known as Rudi Matthee (born 1953), is John and Dorothy Munroe Distinguished Professor of History in the History Department at the University of Delaware, teaching Middle Eastern history and specializing in the history of early modern Iran. He received his PhD in 1991 from the University of California, Los Angeles. Matthee is a member of the Association for the Study of Persianate Societies, for which he also functioned as president twice in 2003–2005 and 2009–2011. He is the author of numerous books and articles on Safavid and Qajar Iran.

Matthee earned a Guggenheim Fellowship in 2026.

== Selected publications ==
A selection of Matthee's works:

- Matthee, Rudi (1991). "The career of Mohammad Beg, grand vizier of Shah 'Abbas II (r. 1642–1666)". Iranian Studies. 24 (1–4): 17–36. doi:10.1080/00210869108701755.
- Matthee, Rudi (1993). "Transforming dangerous nomads into useful artisans, technicians, agriculturists: education in the Reza Shah period". Iranian Studies. 26 (3–4): 313–336. doi:10.1080/00210869308701804.
- Matthee, Rudi (1998). "Introduction to "historiography and representation in Safavid and Afsharid Iran"". Iranian Studies. 31 (2): 143–147. doi:10.1080/00210869808701901.
- Matthee, Rudi (1998). "The Safavid, Afshar, and Zand periods". Iranian Studies. 31 (3–4): 483–493. doi:10.1080/00210869808701926.
- Matthee, Rudolph P. (1999). The Politics of Trade in Safavid Iran: Silk for Silver, 1600–1730. Cambridge: Cambridge University Press. p. 120. ISBN 978-0-521-64131-9.
- (Editor, with Beth Baron) Iran and Beyond: Essays in Middle Eastern History in Honor of Nikki R. Keddie, Mazda Publishers (Costa Mesa, CA), 2000.
- Matthee, Rudi (2001). "Mint Consolidation and the Worsening of the Late Safavid Coinage: The Mint of Huwayza". Journal of the Economic and Social History of the Orient. 44 (4): 505–539. doi:10.1163/15685200160052603.
- (Editor, with Nikki R. Keddie) Iran and the Surrounding World: Interactions in Culture and Cultural Politics, University of Washington Press (Seattle, WA), 2002.
- Matthee, Rudolph P. (2005). The Pursuit of Pleasure: Drugs and Stimulants in Iranian History, 1500–1900. Princeton, New Jersey: Princeton University Press. ISBN 978-0691118550.
- Matthee, Rudi (2006). "Between Arabs, Turks and Iranians: The Town of Basra, 1600-1700". Bulletin of the School of Oriental and African Studies, University of London. 69 (1): 53–78. doi:10.1017/S0041977X06000036. JSTOR 20181989. S2CID 159935186.
- Matthee, Rudi (2009). "The Safavids under Western Eyes: Seventeenth-Century European Travelers to Iran". Journal of Early Modern History. 13 (2): 137–171. doi:10.1163/138537809X12498721974624.
- Matthee, Rudi (2009). "Was Safavid Iran an Empire?". Journal of the Economic and Social History of the Orient. 53 (1–2): 233–265. doi:10.1163/002249910X12573963244449.
- Matthee, Rudi (2012). Persia in Crisis: Safavid Decline and the Fall of Isfahan. London: I.B.Tauris. pp. 1–371. ISBN 978-1-84511-745-0.
- Matthee, Rudi; Floor, Willem; Clawson, Patrick (2013). The Monetary History of Iran: From the Safavids to the Qajars. London; New York: I.B.Tauris. pp. 1–320. ISBN 978-0857721723.
- Matthee, Rudi (2013). "Rudeness and Revilement: Russian–Iranian Relations in the Mid-Seventeenth Century". Iranian Studies. 46 (3): 333–357. doi:10.1080/00210862.2012.758500. S2CID 145596080.
- Matthee, Rudi (2014). "The Ottoman-Safavid War of 986-998/1578-90: Motives and Causes". In Karpat, Kemal; Balgamış, Deniz (eds.). International Journal of Turkish Studies. Vol. 20, Nos 1& 2.
- Matthee, Rudi (2015). "Poverty and Perseverance: The Jesuit Mission of Isfahan and Shamakhi in Late Safavid Iran". Al-Qanṭara. 36 (2): 463–501. doi:10.3989/alqantara.2015.014.
- Matthee, Rudi (2015). "Relations between the Center and the Periphery in Safavid Iran: The Western Borderlands v. the Eastern Frontier Zone". The Historian. 77 (3): 431–463. doi:10.1111/hisn.12068. S2CID 143393018.
- Matthee, Rudi (2016). "From Splendour and Admiration to Ruin and Condescension: Western Travellers to Iran from the Safavids to the Qajars". Iran: Journal of the British Institute of Persian Studies. 54 (1): 3–22. doi:10.1080/05786967.2016.11882297. S2CID 192355145.
- Matthee, Rudi (2019). "Safavid Iran and the "Turkish Question" or How to Avoid a War on Multiple Fronts". Iranian Studies. 52 (3–4): 513–542. doi:10.1080/00210862.2019.1648228. S2CID 204483128.
- Matthee, Rudi (2020). ""Neither Eastern nor Western, Iranian": How the Quest for Self-Sufficiency Helped Shape Iran's Modern Nationalism". Journal of Persianate Studies. 13 (1): 59–104. doi:10.1163/18747167-BJA10001.
- (Editor) The Safavid World , Routledge, 2021.

== Awards ==
Matthee has been awarded numerous prizes for his oeuvre:

- Albert Hourani Book prize (2006). Awarded by the Middle East Association of North America
- Saidi Sirjani Award (2004-2005). Awarded by the International Society for Iranian Studies
- British-Kuwaiti Friendship Book Prize (2012)
- Best foreign-language book on Iran (twice, awarded by the Iranian Ministry of Culture)
