= Mirza Asadollah Nuri =

Iranian official, revenue officer (18th–19th centuries)

Mirza Asadollah Nuri (Persian: میرزا اسدالله نوری) was an Iranian official who served as the revenue officer under the first two Qajar shahs (kings) of Iran, Agha Mohammad Khan Qajar (r. 1789–1797) and Fath-Ali Shah Qajar (r. 1797–1834). He belonged to the prominent Khajeh Nouri family of Nur district in the region of Mazandaran. He was the father of Mirza Aqa Khan Nuri, who served as prime minister under Naser al-Din Shah Qajar (r. 1848–1896) from 1851 to 1858.

== Sources ==
- Amanat, Abbas (1998). "Eʿtemād-al-Dawla, Āqā Khan Nūṟī". In Yarshater, Ehsan (ed.). Encyclopædia Iranica. Vol. VIII/6: Eršād al-zerāʿa–Eʿteżād-al-Salṭana. London and New York: Routledge & Kegan Paul. pp. 658–662. ISBN 978-1-56859-055-4.
- Behrooz, Maziar (2023). Iran at War: Interactions with the Modern World and the Struggle with Imperial Russia. I.B. Tauris. ISBN 978-0755637379.
- Mirzasaleh, Gholamhossein (2012). کتاب رجال و دیپلماتهای عصر قاجار و پهلوی [Men and diplomats of the Qajar and Pahlavi Period] (in Persian). Tehran: Moin. ISBN 978-9641650362.
