= Hajji Washington =

- Film poster
- Directed by: Ali Hatami
- Written by: Ali Hatami
- Produced by: Ali Hatami
- Starring: Ezzatolah Entezami; Richard Harrison; Mario Diano; Mehri Vadadian; Esmail Mohammadi
- Cinematography: Mehrdad Fakhimi
- Edited by: Musa Afshar
- Music by: Mohammad-Reza Lotfi
- Distributed by: Islamic Republic of Iran Broadcasting Channel
- Release date: 1998
- Running time: 98 minutes
- Country: Iran
- Language: Persian

Hajji Washington (Persian: حاجی واشنگتن) is an Iranian comedy-drama film directed by Ali Hatami. The film is a fictionalized account of Iran's first ambassador to the United States, Hajji Washington. Filmed in Italy (filling in for Washington, D.C.) and Ghazali Cinematic Mini-City in 1982, Hajji Washington was not publicly screened in Iran until 1998. The film's music is by the late Persian classical musician Mohammad-Reza Lotfi.

== Plot ==
Hajji Washington is a fictionalized account of the first Iranian ambassador in the United States, Hajji Hossein-Gholi Noori, a loyal Qajar statesman who goes to Washington to found the embassy. After meeting with President Grover Cleveland, Hajji proudly rents a mansion and hires several servants and staff; however there are no Iranians in Washington and the embassy does not have any visitors. Haunted by nostalgia for home and his beloved daughter, Hajji becomes plagued by nightmares. In his reports to the king, he writes exaggerated narrations of his activities using grandiose ornamented language. Funds dwindle and the embassy begins to disintegrate; the staff leaves and Hajji's dialogue with the king slowly declines into a personal monologue. One night President Cleveland shows up in the embassy. An excited Hajji entertains his guest single-handedly while dreaming of writing another grandiose letter to the King of Persia only to learn that his guest is no longer president of United States, but a simple farmer who wants to learn how to grow pistachios. Not long after, a Native American enters the embassy to seek asylum and a friendship grows despite their inability to communicate. Hajji refuses to hand over the refugee and is removed from his post. Hajji, now in the state of madness and absolute silence, boards the boat to return home.

== Cast ==
- Ezzatolah Entezami
- Richard Harrison
- Mario Diano
- Mehri Vadadian
- Esmail Mohammadi
