= List of ambassadors of Iran to the United States =

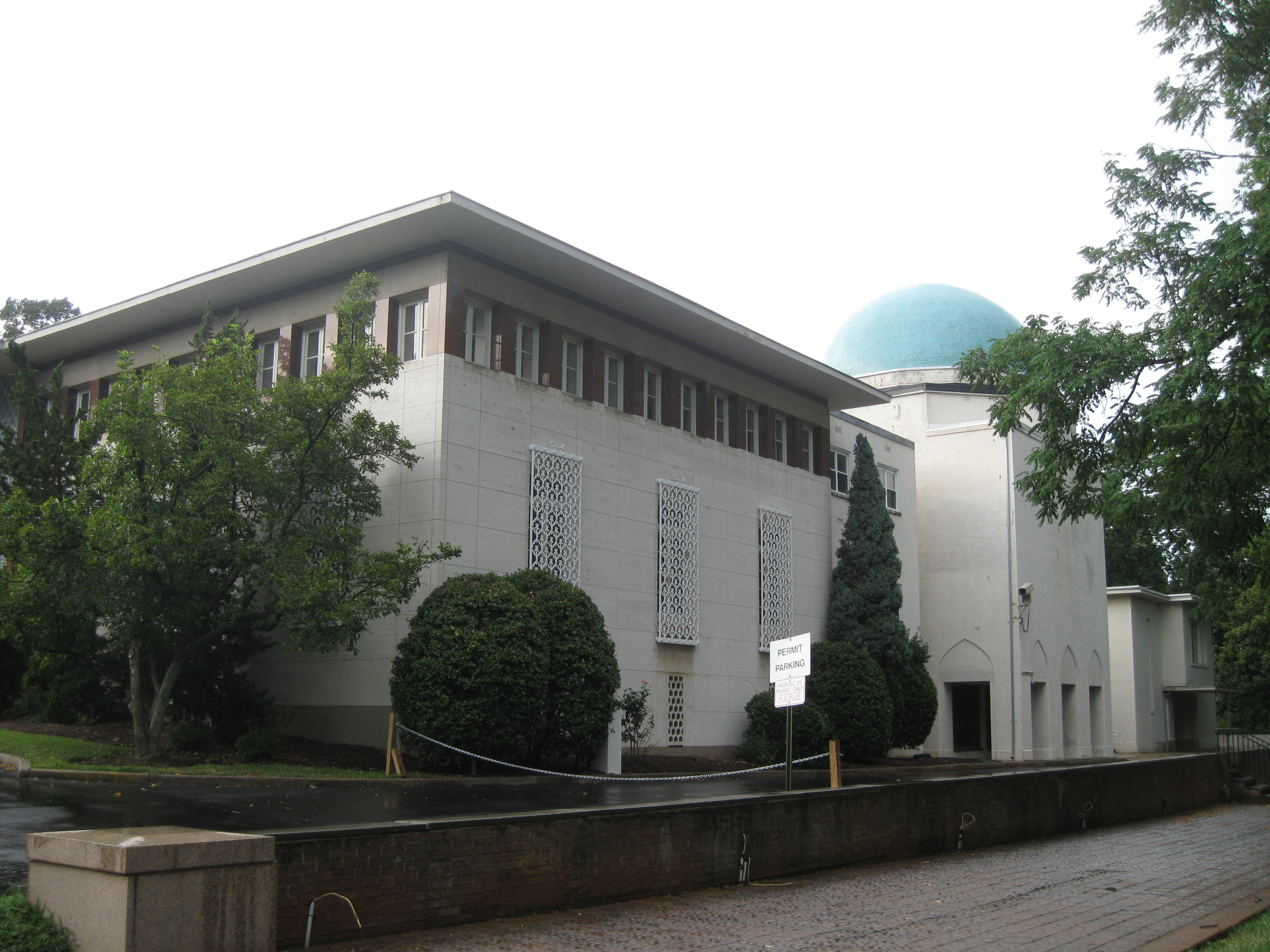
Former Embassy of Iran, Washington, D.C. (2012)

This is a list of ambassadors of Iran to the United States.

On April 7, 1980, the Iranian embassy in Washington, DC closed due to severed diplomatic relations. Iran currently has no ambassador to the United States but simply a chief of the Interests Section of the Islamic Republic of Iran in the United States at the Pakistani Embassy.

List of ambassadors of Iran to the United States
Portrait	Start date	End date	Name	Role	notes
	1888	1889	Hossein-Gholi Khan Noori (also known as Haji Washington)	Envoy extraordinary (E.E.) and minister plenipotentiary (M.P.)	
	17 May 1897	August 1897	Mirza Alinaghi Khan	Ambassador Extraordinary on Special Mission	
	11 December 1900		Isaac Khan (also known as Isaac Khan Mofakhamed Douley)	E.E. and M.P.	
	June 1904		Morteza Khan	E.E. and M.P.	Appt. E.E. and M.P.: February 24, 1905, E.E. and M.P. (Minister removed from September 1911 List)
	31 August 1910		Mirza Ali-Qoli Khan Zarabi (Ali Quli Nabil-Al-Dawla kashi)	Chargé d'affaires (not ad interim)	
	17 March 1914	1918	Mehdi Khan,	E.E. and M.P.	
	25 April 1918		Mirza Ali-Qoli Khan ‌Zarabi	Chargés d'affaires ad interim	Nabil-ed-Dovleh
	18 June 1919		Mirza Abdul Ali Khan	E.E. and M.P.	Sadigh-es-Saltaneh, Appt. E.E. and M.P. (August 8, 1919, August E.E. and M.P.)
	30 August 1921		Hossein Alai	E.E. and M.P.	Appt. E.E. and M.P. (November 15, 1921, E.E. and M.P.)
	5 October 1926		Fathollah Khan Noury Esfandiary	Chargés d'affaires ad interim	
	7 December 1926		Mirza Davoud Khan Meftah	E.E. and M.P.	
	17 October 1931		Yadollah Azodi	Chargé d'affaires (not ad interim)	
	12 June 1933	27 November 1935	Ghaffar Djalal	E.E. and M.P.	Starting in April 1935, country was listed as Iran
	14 January 1936		Hossein Ghods	Chargés d'affaires ad interim	Chargé d'Affaires a.i.: May 1936 Legation removed from list; February 1939 Legation replaced in list
	25 January 1939		Ali Akbar Daftary	Chargés d'affaires ad interim	
	11 January 1940		H. Hadjeb-Davallou	Legation (not Chargé d'affaires)	
	7 February 1940		Mohammad Schayesteh	E.E. and M.P.	Appt. E.E. and M.P. (February 13, 1940, E.E. and M.P.): November 29, 1945, Legation raised to embassy
	19 November 1945	18 September 1950	Hossein Ala	Ambassador extraordinary and plenipotentiary (Amb. E. and P.)	Appt. Amb. E. and P. (November 29, 1945, Amb. E. and P.)
	8 September 1950	22 September 1952	Nasrollah Entezam	Amb. E. and P.	Entezam served two terms
	18 September 1952	19 August 1953	Allah-Yar Saleh	Amb. E. and P.	
	28 September 1953		Abbas Aram	Chargés d'affaires ad interim	Ambassador carried as absent
	22 October 1953	January 1956	Nasrollah Entezam	Amb. E. and P.	
	19 January 1956	22 May 1958	Ali Amini	Amb. E. and P.	
	14 May 1958	16 March 1960	Aligholi Ardalan	Amb. E. and P.	Appt. Amb. E. and P. (May 22, 1958, Amb. E. and P.)
	16 March 1960	3 March 1962	Ardeshir Zahedi	Amb. E. and P.	Zahedi served two terms
	30 March 1962		Hossein Ghods-Nakhai	Amb. E. and P.	Appt. Amb. E. and P. (April 6, 1962, Amb. E. and P.)
	5 April 1963		Mahmoud Foroughi	Amb. E. and P.	Appt. Amb. E. and P. (April 24, 1963, Amb. E. and P.)
	11 May 1965		Khosrow Khosrovani	Amb. E. and P.	Appt. Amb. E. and P. (June 7, 1965, Amb. E. and P.)
	17 May 1967	1 October 1969	Hushang Ansary	Amb. E. and P.	
	16 October 1969	7 March 1973	Amir-Aslan Afshar	Amb. E. and P.	
	7 March 1973	11 February 1979	Ardeshir Zahedi	Amb. E. and P.	(April 9, 1973, Amb. E. and P. until the Iranian Revolution): In February 1979, Shahriar Rouhani took over the revolutionary embassy and controlled it at least until April 1979; Ali Asgar Agah was in charge as the Minister Counselor and Chargé d'affaires as of June 1979
	1979		Mehdi Haeri Yazdi		1979, until Iran hostage crisis. On April 7, 1980, the embassy closed due to severed diplomatic relations.

== See also ==
- List of current Iranian ambassadors
- Iran–United States relations
