= Lotf Ali Khan =

Shah of Iran from 1789 to 1794

Lotf Ali Khan Zand لطفعلی خان زند
- Khan
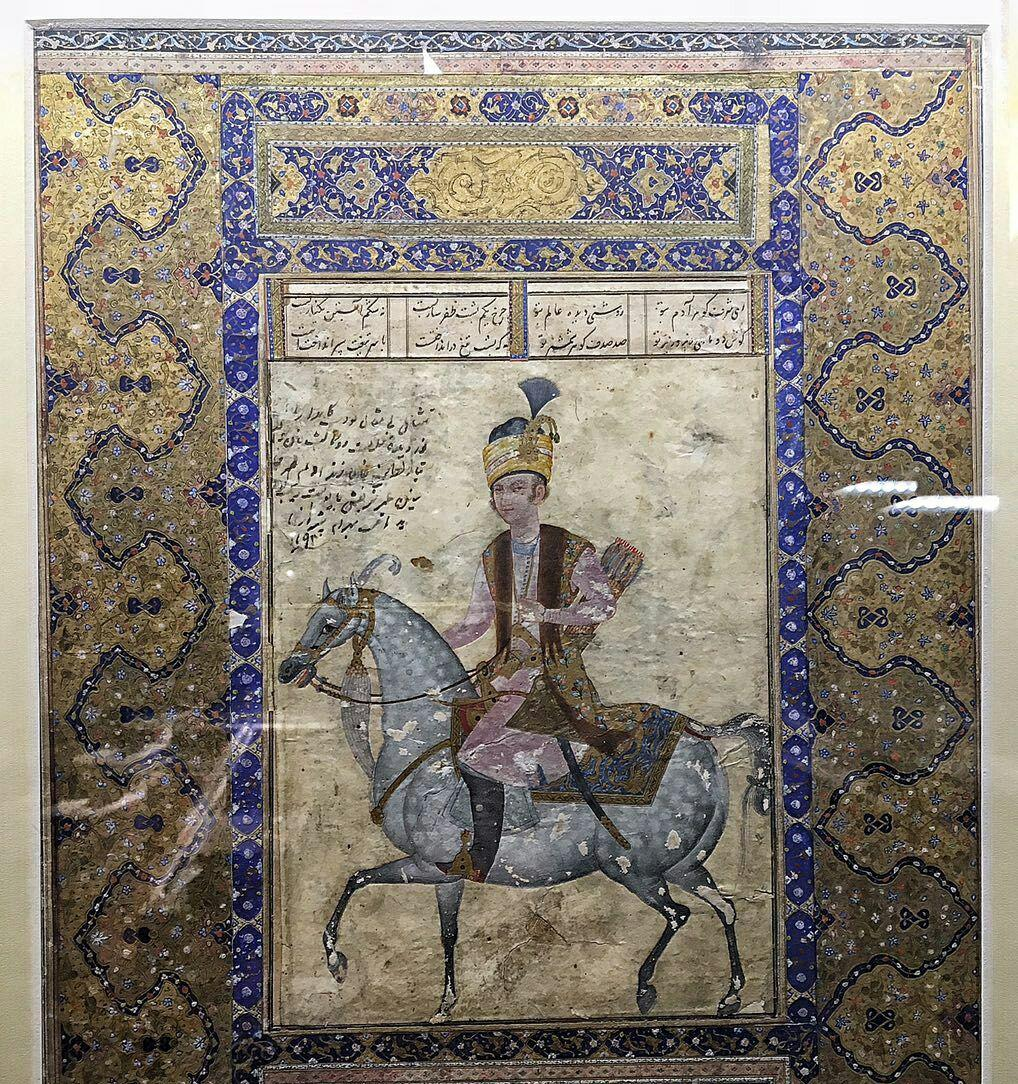
- 18th-century miniature

Shah of Iran
- Reign: 23 January 1789 – 20 March 1794
- Predecessor: Seyd Morad Khan
- Successor: Agha Mohammad Khan Qajar (Qajar conquest)
- Born: c. 1769; Shiraz, Zand Iran
- Died: 1794; Tehran, Qajar Iran
- Burial: Imamzadeh Zeyd, Tehran
- Spouse: Maryam Khanum
- Issue: Fathullah Khan
- Dynasty: Zand
- Father: Jafar Khan
- Religion: Twelver Shia Islam

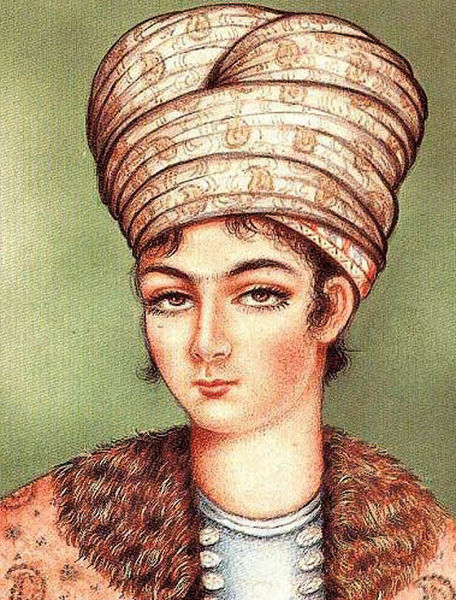
Another depiction of Lotf Ali Khan.

Lotf Ali Khan (Persian: لطفعلی‌خان زند; c. 1769 – 1794) was the last ruler of Iran from the Zand dynasty, ruling from 1789 to 1794.

== Early life ==
Lotf Ali Khan Zand came to power after a decade of infighting among a succession of violent and inept Zand chiefs following the death in 1779 of the dynasty's founder, Karim Khan Zand. Their failure to agree on a successor and to govern with the same benevolence as Karim Khan eroded public faith in the Zands. An increasing number of local and regional leaders began aligning themselves with the eunuch Agha Mohammad Khan Qajar, who sought to defeat and succeed the Zands.

The son of Jafar Khan, Lotf Ali Khan claimed the throne in 1789 upon the death of his father. Jafar Khan had been poisoned by a slave bribed by a rival family member, Sayed Morad Khan Zand. On hearing of his father's murder, Lotf Ali Khan marched to the Zand capital of Shiraz. Sayed Morad Khan was forced to surrender and was executed.

== Physical description ==
Contemporary and later sources frequently mention Lotf Ali Khan's striking physical appearance. He is described as exceptionally handsome, tall, and athletic, with notable skill in horsemanship and swordsmanship. According to the historian John Malcolm, Lotf Ali Khan's “beauty and manly grace” were renowned throughout Persia, and even his adversaries admired his appearance and bearing. The Encyclopaedia Iranica notes that he became the subject of romanticized tales and poetry for his looks, chivalry, and personal bravery. Persian folklore often portrays him as the embodiment of youthful beauty and martial valor.

“Lotf Ali Khan was tall and handsome, possessed of a noble countenance and renowned for his skill with the sword. His beauty and gallantry were celebrated both in his lifetime and long after his death.”

His personal charisma and striking presence helped him inspire fierce loyalty among his followers, who often compared him to the idealized warriors of Persian epic tradition.

== Reign ==
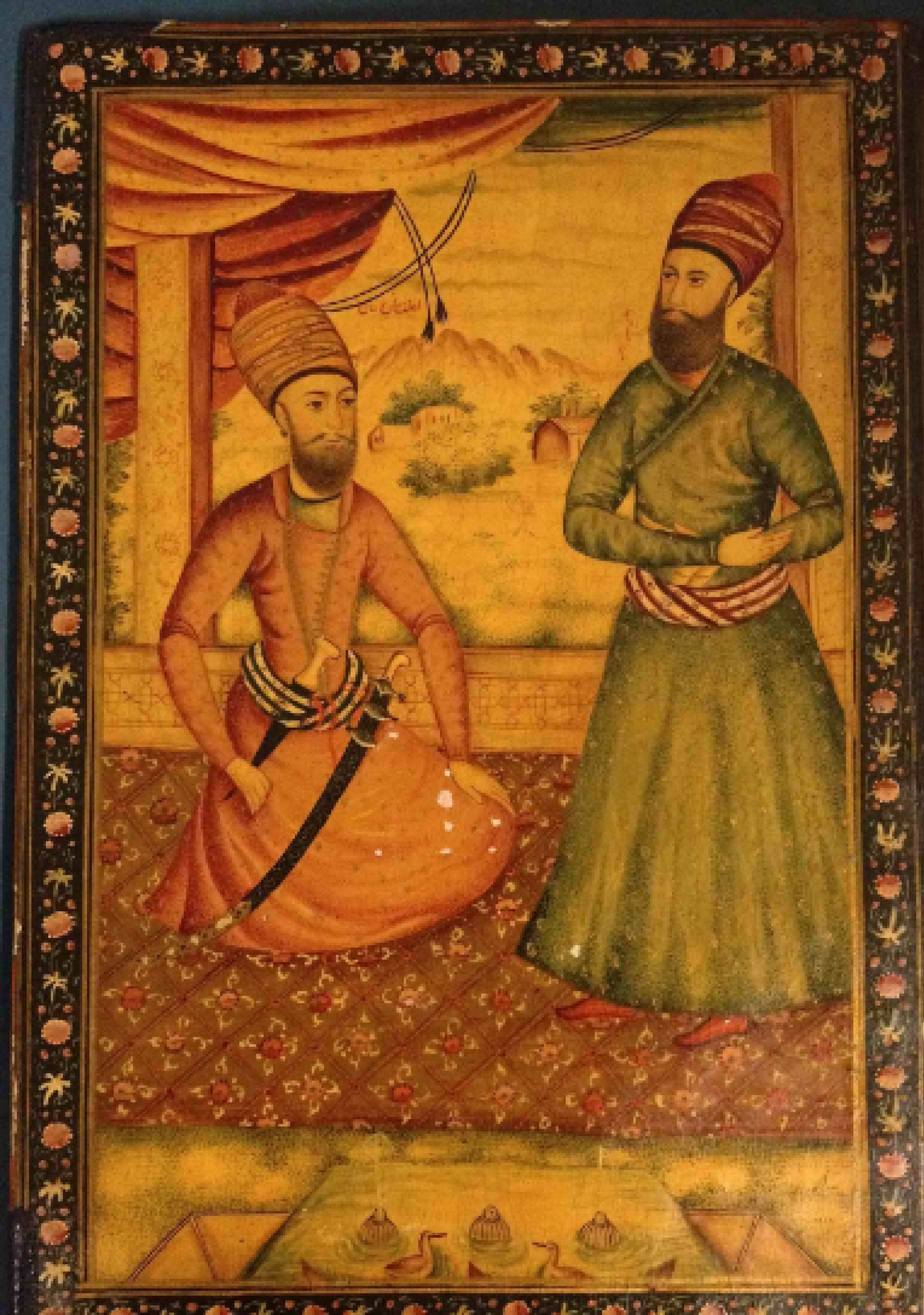
Lotf Ali Khan Zand with his minister Mirza Hossein

Soon after assuming his title, Lotf Ali Khan's principal rival, Agha Mohammad Khan of the Qajar dynasty, marched south to Shiraz. Their two armies met outside of the city in a battle in which Agha Mohammad Khan prevailed, using camels to scare the Zand horses on the battlefield. Despite his defeat, the Zand leader was able to hold Shiraz until the Qajar forces withdrew to Tehran.

The following year, 1790, Lotf Ali Khan led his forces against the Governor of Kerman, who had refused to appear in person to acknowledge the Zand leader. This campaign failed due to harsh winter conditions which led to the loss of a large number of men.

In 1791, Lotf Ali Khan marched to reestablish his control over Isfahan. He had grown increasingly suspicious of the loyalties of Haji Ibrahim, the kalantar (lord mayor) of Shiraz. As a result, he took the kalantar's son with him. Once the Zand army had left the city, Haji Ibrahim had the remaining Zand officers arrested and sent word to his brother, a member of Lotf Ali's army, that the city was now under his control. A mutiny ensued and Lotf Ali and several hundred loyal soldiers rushed back to Shiraz, where they found the gates barred against them. Fearing reprisals against their families locked within the gates, most of Lotf Ali's men deserted him.

With only a handful of followers remaining, the Zand ruler then fled to Bushehr. Here, too, he encountered a hostile local leader. With the help of a sympathetic governor in the port city of Bandar Rig Lotf Ali Khan managed to raise a small army made up of sympathetic locals. With their help, Lotf Ali defeated an attack from Bushire and Kazerun. The governor of Kazerun was captured and blinded, an impulsive act by Lotf Ali Khan that "weakened the sympathy which his youth, his courage, and his misfortunes were so calculated to incite."

Emboldened, Lotf Ali Khan returned to Shiraz, which Haji Ibrahim had offered to Agha Mohammad Khan. There he defeated an army led by Mostafa Qoli Khan Qajar. Lotf Ali Khan's smaller force also succeeded in repelling the attack of a second Qajar force. At this point, Agha Mohammad Khan himself led 30–40 thousand men against the much smaller Zand army.

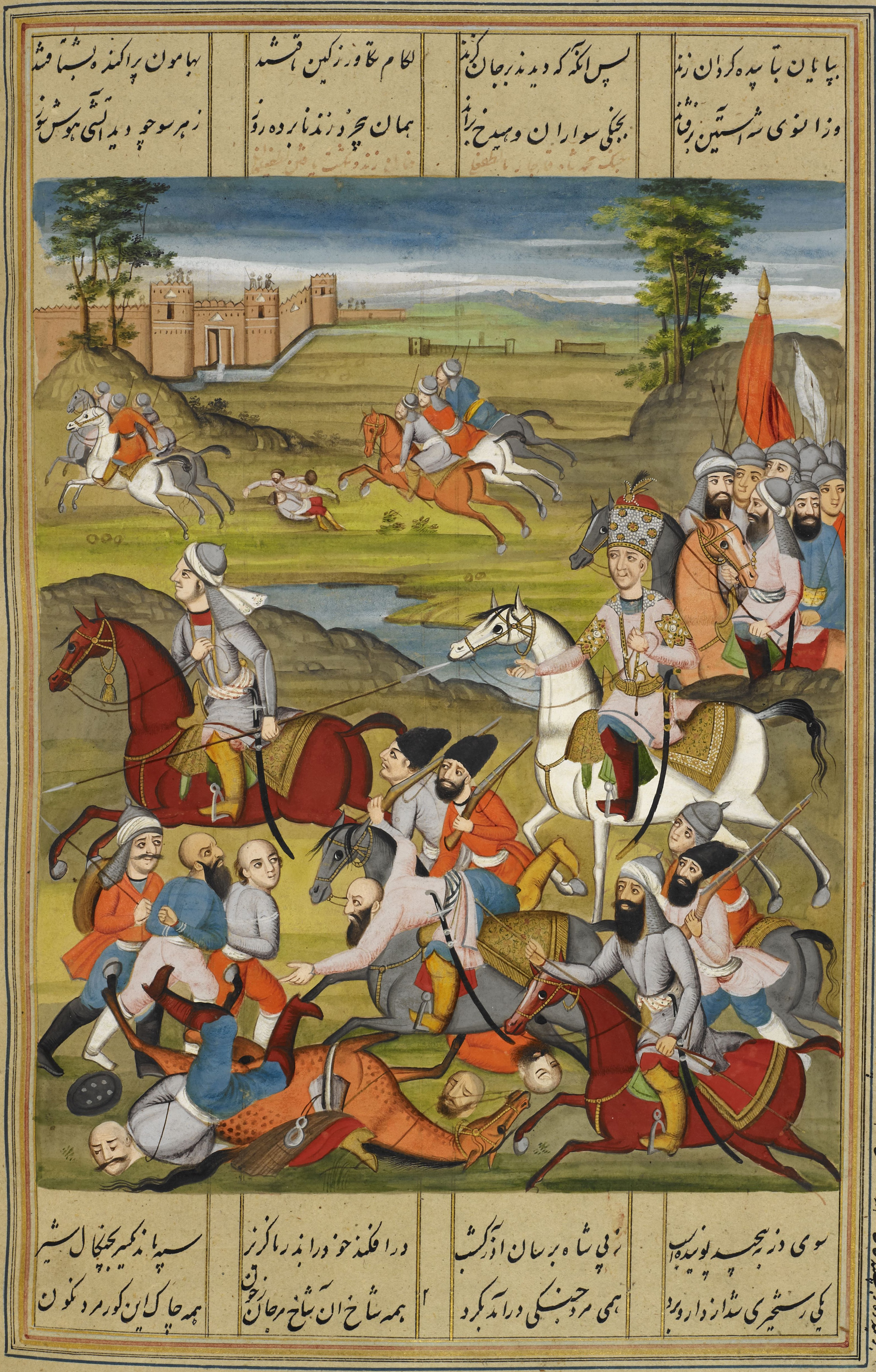
Defeat of Lotf ‘Ali Khan by Agha Mohammad Khan; the city of Shiraz in the background. Folio from the Shahanshahnameh of Fath 'Ali Khan Saba, dated 1810

In a pivotal battle near Persepolis whose outcome would determine the leadership of the nation, Lotf Ali Khan gained the upper hand over the much larger Qajar army, launching a nighttime raid on the main camp of the Agha Mohammad Khan. As the Qajar soldiers scattered, Lotf Ali assumed Agha Mohammad Khan had fled with them and that the camp was secured. He forbade his men from plundering the camp and withdrew to wait for sunrise. But Agha Mohammad Khan had remained hidden in the royal pavilion. At dawn the call to prayer signaled that the Qajar army had regrouped. Lotf Ali Khan had no choice but to retreat. (An alternate version of this story suggests that Lotf Ali Khan was tricked into waiting until daybreak to enter the enemy camp on advice of a Qajar spy named Mirza Fathollah-e Ardelani.)

He and his followers fled first to Kerman (1792), but with the Qajars in pursuit they were forced to Tabas. With the aid of a sympathetic governor in Tabas, Lotf Ali attempted without success to retake Shiraz. At this time, the former Zand capital was firmly under the control of Agha Mohammad Khan. In July 1792, the Qajar shah ordered the family and harem of Lotf Ali Khan and other Zand nobles and their families sent to his new capital, Tehran.

Repelled in his effort to reclaim Shiraz, Lotf Ali Khan decided to travel east to Kandahar in modern-day Afghanistan to solicit the aid of Timur Shah, but after a few days he learned of Timur Shah's death. Indecisive and depressed, Lotf Ali Khan turned back. His spirits were restored by pledges of support from tribal leaders from Bam and Narmashir. Bolstered by an additional 1,000 horsemen, Lotf Ali Khan took Kerman in 1794. He held the city for four months against Agha Mohammad Khan and a large army. During this time, gold coins were struck in Kerman in tribute to the Zand leader. One of these coins found its way to Agha Mohammad Khan who was so enraged that he sent orders that Fatollah Khan, the son of Lotf Ali who had been taken to Tehran with other Zand nobility, was to be castrated. As the siege of Kerman wore on, some troops became disaffected and ultimately opened the citadel gates to the Qajar army. After a three-hour battle Lotf Ali fled by night to Bam.

Agha Mohammad Khan exacted a brutal revenge on the people of Kerman for harboring his enemy. All the male inhabitants were killed or blinded, and a pile was made out of 20,000 detached eyeballs and poured in front of the victorious Qajar leader. The women and children were sold into slavery, and the city was destroyed over ninety days.

== Captivity and death ==
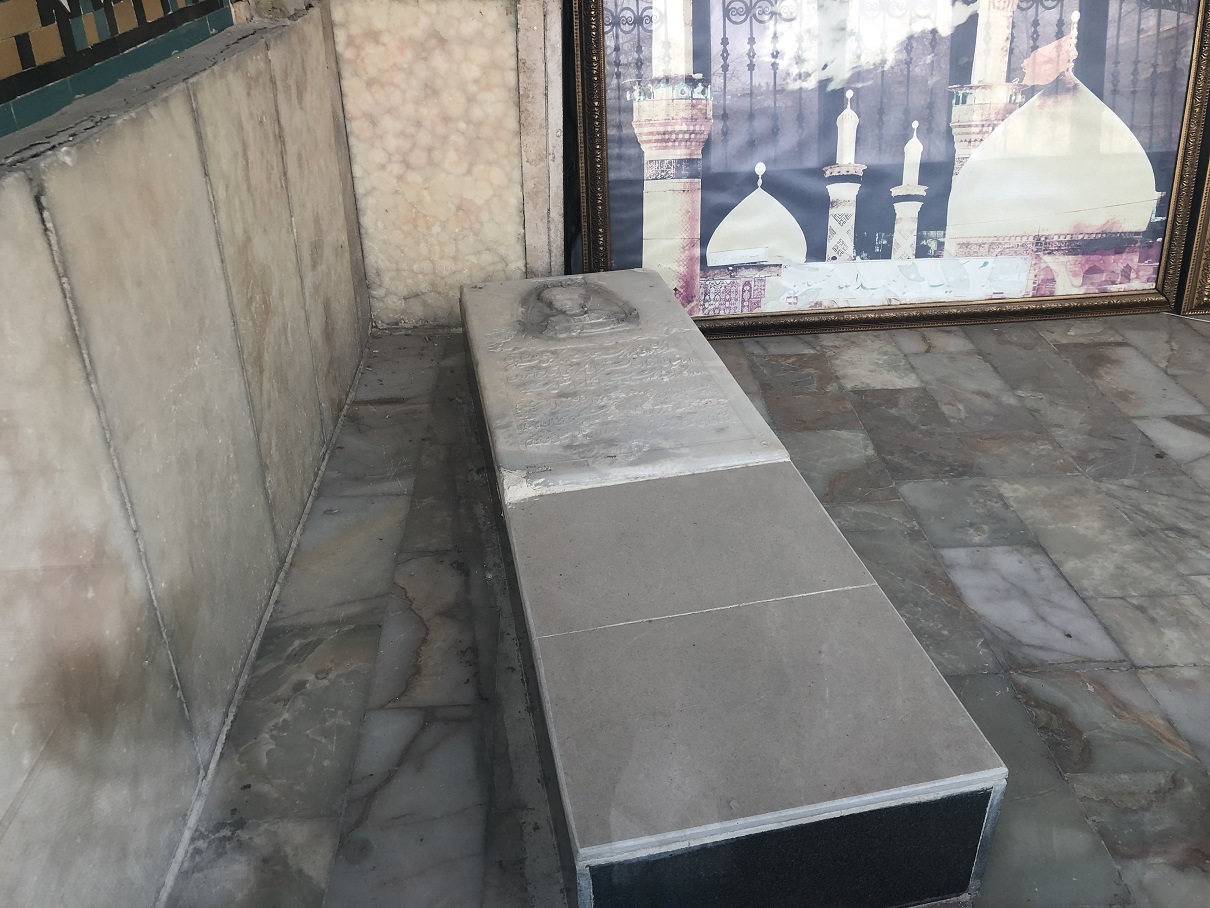
Tomb of Lotf Ali Khan in Imamzadeh Zeyd in Tehran

Finally, Lotf Ali Khan was betrayed by the ruler of Bam who feared that his brother had fallen into Qajar hands in Kerman. Lotf Ali Khan was captured soon after, nearby. According to legend, Lotf Ali Khan took on 14 men single-handedly for two full hours before being overcome.

The last of the Zand rulers was finally delivered to Agha Mohammad Khan Qajar, who had long waited to exact revenge on his arch-rival. "The page of history would be stained by a recital of the indignities offered to the royal captive..." It is reported that Lotf Ali Khan was blinded, imprisoned and tortured in Tehran, before being choked to death in the late of 1794.

According to tradition, Lotf Ali Khan wrote the following poem with his own blood on the walls of his cell;

O Lord, You took my kingdom,

And gifted it to one who is neither man or woman.

The turning of fortune has taught me well:

Before You, what is the difference between a drum-beater and a swordsman?

== Legacy ==
A popular ballad in Shiraz during the early Qajar period, mourning the death of Lotf Ali Khan

The roof of the inner sanctum has fallen,
From Mazandaran, an army marches

Even now, the wailing of the reed flute comes—
Her voice continues, passing onward.

We fought in vain, the war unfinished,
Loffi departs, Kerman slips away.

Even now, the wailing of the reed flute comes—
Her voice continues, passing onward.

O Haji, I called you father,
Yet you have cast us into the abyss.
Khosrow has fallen into the hand of the Qajar

Even now, the wailing of the reed flute comes—
Her voice continues, passing onward.

Loft Ali Khan, that man of passion,
They sought his wife and stole her away.
What is Tabas? What is Tehran?
She lives on like a bird in a cage.

Even now, the wailing of the reed flute comes—
Her voice continues, passing onward.

Loft Ali Khan that man of virtue—
All who saw him could only sigh.
His mother, his sisters, tore at their clothes in sorrow,
His fortune fell asleep, and so he died.

Even now, the wailing of the reed flute comes—
Her voice continues, passing onward.

The British writer Sir Harford Jones Brydges knew Lotf Ali, whom he called, "the last chivalrous figure among the kings of Persia." Brydges writes sadly of Lotf Ali's death, of his "little son" who was castrated, his daughters who were forced to marry "the scum of the earth" and his wife who was dishonoured.

Accounts of Lotf Ali Khan's personality and behavior depict a person of courage and perseverance who inspired great loyalty among his followers. Had he been able to defeat Agha Mohammad Khan, he might have restored his family's dynasty and its good name. But a fatal mistake in a pivotal battle effectively ended Lotf Ali Khan's ambitions. With his defeat, the 44-year reign of the Zands came to an end and the first chapter in the 131-year Qajar dynasty was written.

His tomb is in Imamzadeh Zeyd in the Old Bazaar of Tehran. His portrait is in the Museum of Fine Arts in Sadabad Palace. It is said that Lotf Ali Khan was uniquely handsome and tremendously skillful with the sword.

Today one of the main avenues in Shiraz bears Lotf Ali Khan Zand's name. In Shiraz and other cities, streets bear the name of the Zand patriarch Karim Khan. Given that Karim Khan Zand never claimed the title of king or shah, but chose simply to declare himself the advocate or regent of the people, Lotf Ali Khan Zand is the only former Shah to be honored in this way in the post-revolutionary period.

== Sources ==
- Perry, John R., Karim Khan Zand: A History of Iran 1747–1779, ISBN 0-226-66098-2, Univ. of Chicago Press, 1979, pp. 299–301
- Mostafa, Abdollah, The Administrative and Social History of the Qajar Period, Vol. 1, ISBN 1-56859-041-5, Mazda Publishers, 1997, pp. 6–8
- Malcolm, John, The History of Persia, Volume II, Part 1, 1829 (Reprinted 2004 by Elibron Classics)
- Sykes, Percy Molesworth, A History of Persia, Vol. 1, MacMillan and Co, 1915

Lotf Ali Khan Zand dynasty Born: 1769 Died: 1794
Iranian royalty
Preceded by Sayed Murad Khan Zand	Shah of Iran; 1789–1794	Succeeded by Agha Mohammad Khan Qajar
