= Amīr Aṣlān Afshār =

Iranian politician and diplomat (1919–2021)

Amir-Aslan Afshar
- امیراصلان افشار

Ambassador of Iran to West Germany
- In office 12 September 1973 – 1 August 1977
- Prime Minister: Amir-Abbas Hoveida
- Preceded by: Hossein Loghman-Adham
- Succeeded by: Hushang Amir-Mokri

Ambassador of Iran to the United States
- In office 16 October 1969 – 7 March 1973
- Prime Minister: Amir-Abbas Hoveida
- Preceded by: Hushang Ansary
- Succeeded by: Ardeshir Zahedi

Ambassador of Iran to Austria
- In office 1 August 1967 – 16 October 1969
- Prime Minister: Amir-Abbas Hoveida
- Preceded by: Ahmad Akhzar
- Succeeded by: Esmaeil Farbord

Member of the National Consultative Assembly
- In office 20 August 1956 – 20 August 1960
- Constituency: Maragheh

Personal details
- Born: 22 November 1919 Tehran, Sublime State of Persia
- Died: 18 February 2021 (aged 101) Nice, France
- Spouse: Kamila Sa'ed (m. 1949)
- Children: 2
- Parent(s): Jan-Mohammad Khan Amir Masoud (father); Amir-Bano Tal'at Molok (mother)
- Relatives: Mohammad Sa'ed (father-in-law)
- Education: University of Vienna

Amir-Aslan Afshar Qasemlou (Persian: امیراصلان افشار قاسملو; 22 November 1919 – 18 February 2021) was an Iranian politician and diplomat.

== Early life ==
He was a descendant of Afshar Qasemlu who ruled Kerman, during the reign of Nader Shah of the Afsharid dynasty. His father, Colonel Amir Masoud Afshar Qasemlu, served during Reza Shah's reign. Afshar was born on 22 November 1919. He graduated from the Hindenburg-Oberrealschule Berlin-Wilmersdorf in 1939, and received his doctorate in political science from the University of Vienna in 1942.

== Career ==
Afshār joined the Foreign Service in 1948. From 1950 to 1954, he was an attaché at the Iranian embassy in The Hague. From 1956 to 1960, he was a member of the National Consultative Assembly. In addition to his work as a member of parliament, he was a delegate to the United Nations Economic Committee from 1957 to 1961.

He later served as the Ambassador of Iran to Austria from 1967 to 1969, then as the Ambassador of Iran to the United States from 1969 to 1972, and the Ambassador of Iran to West Germany from 1973 to 1977.

On January 16, 1979, during the Iranian Revolution, Afshar left Iran on the same plane as Shah Mohammad Reza Pahlavi.

== Death ==
On 18 February 2021, Afshār died during the COVID-19 pandemic in France, at his home in Nice, aged 101.

== Awards ==
- 1965: Decoration of Honour for Services to the Republic of Austria
