= Haji Washington =

First Iranian ambassador to the United States (1849-1937)

Hajji Hossein-Gholi Khan
- حاجی حسین‌قلی‌ خان
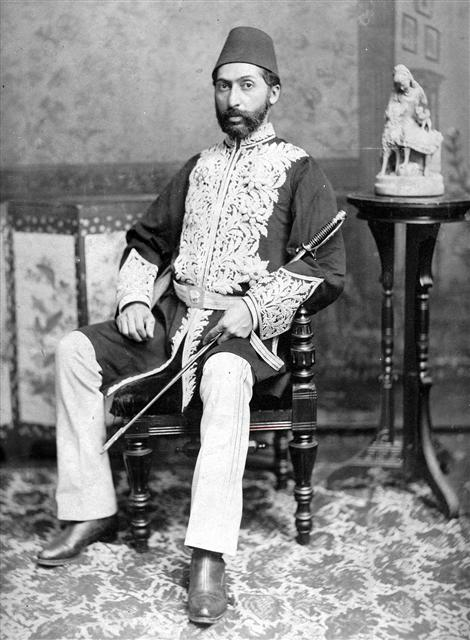
- Photograph of Haji Washington c. 1921

Ambassador of Iran to the United States
- In office 1888–1889
- Monarch: Naser al-Din Shah Qajar
- Preceded by: Office established
- Succeeded by: Mirza Alinaghi Khan

Personal details
- Born: 1849
- Died: 1937 (aged 87–88)
- Parent: Mirza Aqa Khan Nuri (father)
- Other names: Hajji Washington

Hajji Hossein-Gholi Khan Noori (1849–1937), also known as Hajji Washington (Persian: حاجی واشنگتن), was an Iranian politician, cabinet minister, and diplomat and belonged to one of the oldest aristocratic families in Iran - the Khajeh Nouris, tracing their history back to over one thousand years.

== Early life and education ==
Hajji Hossain-Gholi Khan was the second son of the Iranian grand vizier, Mirza Aqa Khan Nuri. He was educated by his father. He then entered the service of the Ministry of finance, and later the ministry of foreign affairs.

== Political career ==
He was appointed the first ambassador to the United States in 1889, where he kept a scrapbook of newspaper cuttings from the American press about the reigning monarch Naser al-Din Shah Qajar. He objected to how the Shah’s official visit to England in 1889 was covered by the press and he resigned from his post in protest. After his return from the United States, he served as the minister of public works ("favaayed-e aamme") and married Naser al-Din Shah’s daughter.

== Diplomatic career ==
Haji Hossain-Gholi Khan was the Iranian Consul General to India. In 1885, when the Democratic Party took over the administration, Benjamin, the first US ambassador in Iran, resigned his post conforming with diplomatic practice. On 20 November 1885, President Cleveland appointed Fredrick H. Winston as Benjamin's successor. On 3 August 1886, Spencer Pratt was appointed as the third US Consul General in Tehran. At this time, Naser al-Din Shah decided to open a permanent Iranian embassy in Washington. Haji Hossain-Gholi Khan was appointed as Minister Plenipotentiary and Envoy Extraordinary to Washington

He selected his staff of ten of the English-speaking members of the Iranian Foreign Ministry. It took him and his staff a 2 month journey to arrive in Washington in which he managed to spark interest in Iran among American Orientalist.

== Later years ==
He returned to live in Tehran after his mission to the US.

- Haji Washington had one son named Nasrullah and two daughters named Mehr Mah and Taj al Molook who married Hossein Ghods-Nakhai, the Iranian minister of foreign affairs and ambassador to Washington in the Pahlavi era.

== See also ==
- Hajji Washington, a fictitious film based on the story of the same politician.
