= Mirza Shafi Mazandarani =

Grand Vizier of Iran (1744-1818/19)

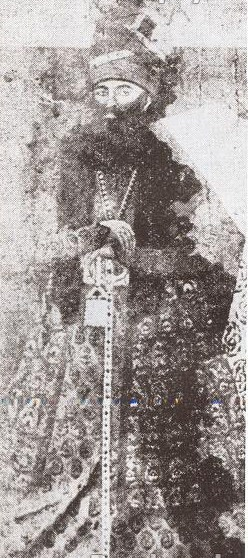
- Illustration of Mirza Shafi Mazandarani

Grand Vizier of Iran
- In office 1801–1818/19
- Monarch: Fath-Ali Shah Qajar
- Preceded by: Hajji Ebrahim Shirazi
- Succeeded by: Hajji Mohammad Hossein Khan

Personal details
- Born: 1744 Afsharid Iran
- Died: 1818/19 Qazvin, Qajar Iran

Mirza Shafi Mazandarani (Persian: میرزا شفیع مازندرانی) was the prime minister of the Qajar Iran's shah (king) Fath-Ali Shah Qajar (r. 1797–1834) from 1801 until his death in 1818/19.

A son of Mirza Haji Ahmad, he was born in 1744 to an Isfahani family that moved to the Mazandaran province after the assassination of Nader Shah in 1747. His career started in the court of Agha Mohammad Khan Qajar (r. 1789–1797), the founder of the Qajar dynasty.

== Sources ==
- Behrooz, Maziar (2023). Iran at War: Interactions with the Modern World and the Struggle with Imperial Russia. I.B. Tauris. ISBN 978-0-7556-3737-9.
- Bournoutian, George (2021). From the Kur to the Aras: A Military History of Russia's Move into the South Caucasus and the First Russo-Iranian War, 1801–1813. Brill. ISBN 978-90-04-44515-4.
- Atabaki, T. (1993). "Mīrzā S̲h̲afīʿ Māzandarānī". In Bosworth, C. E.; van Donzel, E.; Heinrichs, W. P. & Pellat, Ch. (eds.). The Encyclopaedia of Islam, Second Edition. Volume VII: Mif–Naz. Leiden: E. J. Brill. ISBN 978-90-04-09419-2.
- Javadi, H. (1983). "Abu'l-Ḥasan Khan Īḷčī". In Yarshater, Ehsan (ed.). Encyclopædia Iranica. Vol. I/3: Ablution, Islamic–Abū Manṣūr Heravı̄. London and New York: Routledge & Kegan Paul. pp. 308–310. ISBN 978-0-71009-092-8.
