= Mehri Vadadian =

Iranian actress

- مهری ودادیان
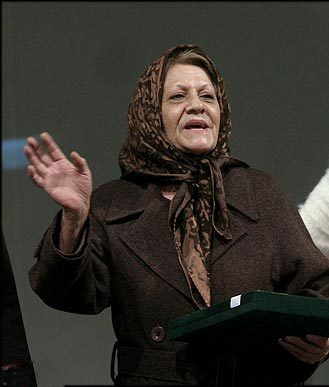
- In January 2008
- Born: Kobra Vadadian Gholamhossein; May 22, 1936; Tehran, Iran
- Died: February 28, 2011 (aged 74); Tehran, Iran
- Occupation: Actress
- Years active: 1967–2006

Mehri Vadadian (May 22, 1936–February 28, 2011) was an Iranian actress, known for her roles in numerous films and TV dramas. Among her films such as Shazdeh Ehtejab (dir. Bahman Farmanara), Downpour (dir. Bahram Beizai), The Morning of the Fourth Day (dir. Kamran Shirdel) and Delshodegan (dir. Ali Hatami). She died in Sajjad Hospital in Tehran in 2011.
