= Mirza Aqa Khan Nuri =

Iranian politician (1807–1865)

Sadr-e Azam Mirza Aqa Khan Nuri E'temad ol-Dowleh
- میرزا آقا خان نوری
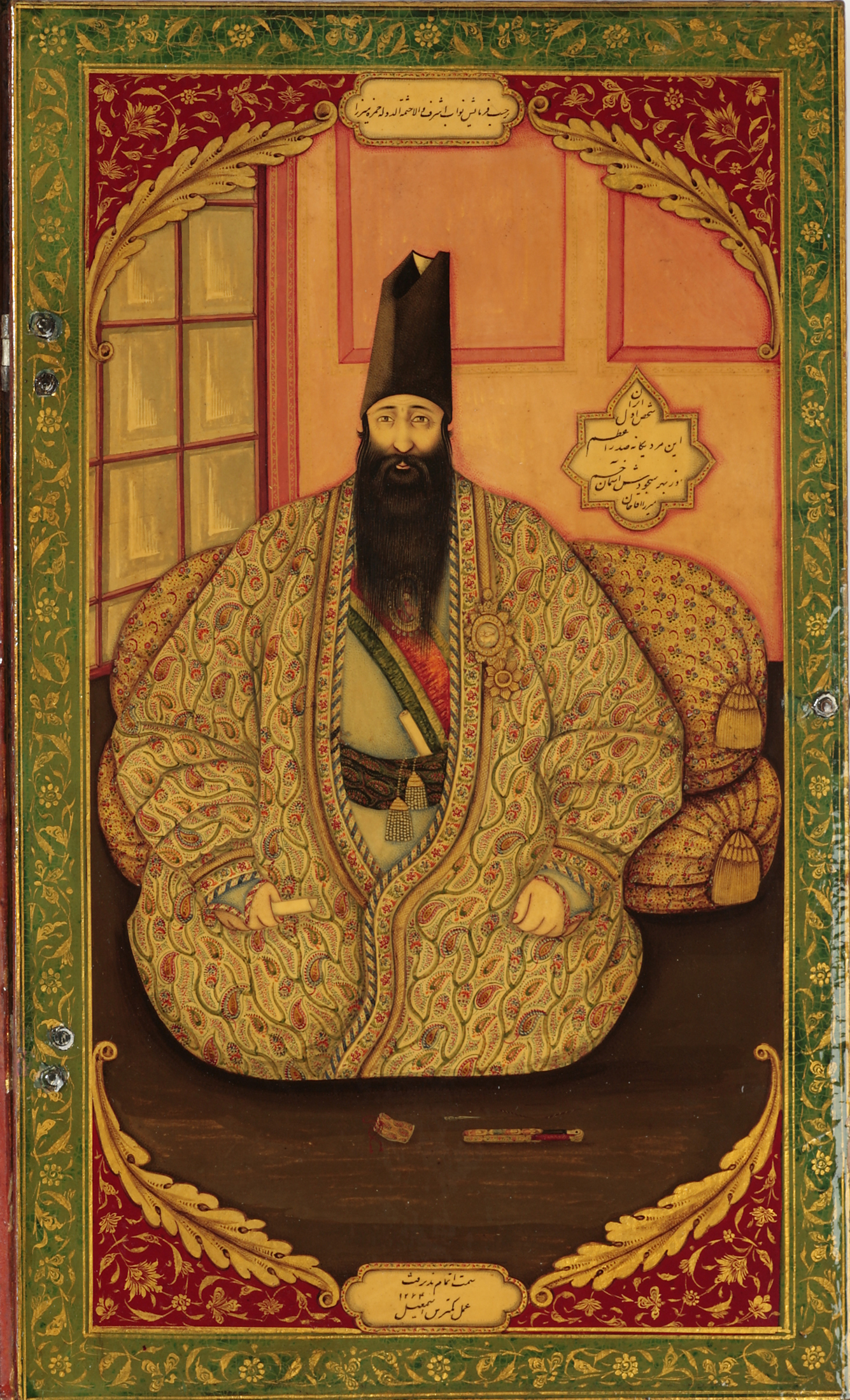
- Mirza Aqa Khan Nuri as depicted on a mirror case, created in Esfahan in 1857/58. The image is possibly based on a watercolour by the well-known Qajar painter Abu’l-Hasan Ghaffari (Sani-ol-Molk)

Prime Minister of Qajar Iran
- In office 1 December 1851 – 1858
- Monarch: Naser al-Din Shah Qajar
- Preceded by: Amir Kabir
- Succeeded by: Jafar Khan Moshir od-Dowleh

Personal details
- Born: c. 1807 Nur, Qajar Iran
- Died: 10 March 1865 Qom, Qajar Iran
- Resting place: Karbala (present-day Iraq)
- Children: Many, Including; Haji Washington
- Parent: Mirza Asadollah Nuri (father)

Mirza Aqa Khan Nuri (Persian: میرزا آقا خان نوری; c. 1807 – 1865), also known as E'temad-ol Dowleh (اعتماد الدوله), was a politician in Qajar Iran, who served as prime minister (صدر اعظم, "ṣadr-e aʿẓam") in 1851–58 during the reign of Naser al-Din Shah Qajar (r. 1848–96). He was a prominent member of the Khajeh Nouri family.

Mirza Aqa Khan Nuri was a Persian statesman who served as Prime Minister of Qajar Iran under Naser al-Din Shah Qajar from 1851 to 1858. His political career was closely connected with the British diplomatic mission in Iran. he became one of the principal rivals of Amir Kabir, whose dismissal and subsequent execution paved the way for Nuri's appointment as prime minister. During his premiership, Iran faced the Bábí persecutions, growing European influence and conflict over Herat, which culminated in the Anglo-Persian War and Treaty of Paris.

== Early life ==
Aqa Khan-e Nuri was born in Nur as the second son of Mirza Asadollah Nuri, who served as the chief army accountant (Persian: لشکر نویسی باشی, romanized: laškarnevīs-bāšī) during the reign of two subsequent Qajar rulers: Agha Mohammad Khan Qajar and Fath-Ali Shah Qajar. Their family, known as the Khajeh Nouri family, were part of the local nobility of the Nur region in Mazandaran, and were prominently visible both in the bureaucracy of the state as well as the army since the mid-18th century.

== Career ==
=== Rise to power ===
At the age of 20, Agha Khan entered the court of Fath-Ali Shah as a Lashkar-nevis (Muster-Master) and later became Lashkar-nevis-Bashi (Chief Muster-Master). He subsequently rose to the position of Minister of War. Before attaining the position of Lashkarnevis, Mirza Aqa Khan served under Allahyar Khan Asef od-Dowleh, who had pro-British sympathies. In his youth, he was intelligent, talented, and eloquent. As a result, he was able to rise within the Qajar administration, particularly during the reigns of Fath-Ali Shah and Mohammad Shah. Mirza Aqa Khan's salary as Minister of War was 42,000 tomans per year, equivalent to £27,993. At the same time British prime minister's annual salary was £5,000, meaning that Aqa Khan received more than five times the salary of the British prime minister.

He had good relations with Mohammad Shah and Malek Jahan Khanom Mahd-e Olya but some confidential information was reaching the British. Mohammad Shah ordered several men to guard of areas around foreign embassies and report to him the names of those who frequented them. After several days of surveillance, they discovered that Mirza Aqa Khan, the Minister of War, was visiting the British embassy at night in disguise and returning several hours later.

=== Exile ===
However, he was hostile toward the Prime Minister Haji Mirza Aqasi. Eventually, Aqasi arrested Agha Khan for his relations with Britain and exiled to Kashan. Agha Khan remained in Kashan until the death of Mohammad Shah in 1848. He then returned to Tehran with the assistance of Mahd-e Olya, hoping to become prime minister. When Naser al-Din Shah arrived in Tehran and was crowned, he appointed Amir Kabir as prime minister. Aware of Mirza Aqa Khan Nuri’s views and conduct, Amir Kabir decided to appoint him to an office so that he would not interfere with the affairs of the government, and granted him the title of E'temad ol-Dowleh. Amir Kabir ordered him to return to Kashan.

=== Plot to Assassination of Amir Kabir ===
Mirza Aqa Khan, being an ambitious man and enjoying of support from the British, conspired with the Shah's mother, Mahd-e Olya, to remove Amir Kabir from power. In collusion with other opponents of Amir Kabir, he was involved in Amir Kabir's murder at the Fin Bathhouse in Kashan.

== Prime Minister of Qajar Iran ==
Mirza Aqa Khan Nuri was appointed Prime Minister on 1 December 1851, following the dismissal of Amir Kabir, on the occasion of the Shah’s birthday. At Naser al-Din Shah’s request, before assuming the premiership, he renounced his British citizenship by writing a letter to the British minister plenipotentiary in Iran and accepted the position on two conditions. First, that Amir Kabir be eliminated and second, that his life be spared in the event that he was found at fault in the conduct of his duties as prime minister. Naser al-Din Shah agreed to both conditions.

=== Bábi revolt ===
On August 1852 in Shemiran, followers of the Báb attempted to assassinate Naser al-Din Shah. The assassination attempt failed and Six perpetrators was executed in Tehran. After the assassination attempt, the Shah ordered a massacre of the Bábís. Many Bábís, well as people suspected of being Bábís were subjected to a horrific mass killing. Organized by religious scholars, government officials, Qajar princes, bureaucrats and merchants, the persecution involved the public torture and execution of many victims in brutal ways. To reduce of likelihood retaliation, Mirza Aqa Khan Nuri ordered that victims be distributed among different groups, including soldiers, nobles, teachers and students of Dar al-Fonun, so that responsibility for the massacre would be shared among all. Some of the victims were subjected to brutal punishment known as Shamʿ-ājīn, in which candles were inserted into wounds made in their bodies.

International developments along with efforts of the Russian, British and Ottoman empires to gain Iran's friendship during Crimean War, the outcome of that war, and the separation of Herat from Iran were among the most important events during the premiership of Mirza Aqa Khan Nuri.

=== Second Herat War ===
Under heavy pressure from Britain, Mirza Aqa Khan Nuri signed an 1853 agreement restricting Iranian interference in Herat. When Iran subsequently launched a military campaign to capture of city in 1856, the British responded by invading southern Iran. This forced Iran to withdraw, recognize Afghanistan's independence and permanently surrender its claims over Herat under the Treaty of Paris (1857).

== Later life and death ==
Following his dismissal from the premiership in 1858, Mirza Aqa Khan Nuri was spared execution because Naser al-Din Shah had signed a royal pledge prior to his appointment promising that his life would be protected. He was subsequently exiled, spending periods in Varamin, Arak, Yazd, and Isfahan, before eventually being settled in Qom. He lived for six years after his downfall He died in Qom on 10 March 1865 at the age of 59. (Note: Beign possibly a victim of foul play organized by his enemies) His remains were later transferred to Karbala and buried in a mosque complex funded by one-third of the estate of his predecessor and rival Amir Kabir.

=== Character and Vision ===
Fath-Ali Shah was an ideal monarch in Nuri's eyes. As is evident from many of his letters, Nuri longed for the period of his reign and wished for a return to those days. His attachment to luxury, titles and decorations was likewise shaped by the environment of Fath-Ali Shah's court. At the same time, he paid considerable attention to preserving courtly formalities and the hierarchy of the bureaucracy. Arthur de Gobineau, who met Nuri in 1856, described him in his travel account as follows:

[Nuri] sleeps only a few hours and works throughout the day and almost the entire night. He wants to oversee everything—domestic affairs, foreign affairs, finances, criminal matters and commerce. The other ministers are ministers in name only and have little importance; the prime minister performs their duties. A group of secretaries is constantly gathered around him; he issues orders, and they write them down in his presence. He then seals them and personally entrusts them to the courier… There is hardly a household in Tehran or elsewhere about which he does not know some amusing anecdote. Since he has an admirable memory and a cheerful disposition, and knows all the families and their relatives and connections throughout Iran, he is one of the most entertaining and lively storytellers one could sit and listen to.

== Offspring ==
Mirza Aqa Khan had many children, some of whom held official positions during his lifetime and others after his death. Among them;

- Mirza Kazem Khan Nizam al-Mulk, who was appointed as deputy to Amir Nezam, the first crown prince of Naser al-Din Shah.
- Hosaynqoli Khan Sadr al-Saltaneh (Haji Washington), who became Iran’s first ambassador to the United States.

== Sources ==
- Amanat, Abbas (1998). "EʿTEMĀD-AL-DAWLA, ĀQĀ KHAN NŪRĪ". In Yarshater, Ehsan (ed.). Encyclopædia Iranica. Vol. VIII/6: Eršād al-zerāʿa–Eʿteżād-al-Salṭana. London and New York: Routledge & Kegan Paul. pp. 658–662. ISBN 978-1-56859-055-4.
- History Department (1995). "آقاخان نوری (Aqa Khan Nuri; Aqa Khan Nuri)" [The Great Islamic Encyclopedia]. دائرةالمعارف بزرگ اسلامی (in Persian). Vol. 1. Tehran: Center for the Great Islamic Encyclopedia.
- Bamdad, Mehdi (1983). شرح حال رجال ایران در قرن ۱۲ و ۱۳ و ۱۴ هجری [Biographies of Iranian Notables in the 12th, 13th and 14th Hijri Centuries] (in Persian). Vol. 4 (3rd ed.). Tehran: Golshan.
- Makki, Hossein. زندگانی میرزا تقی خان امیرکبیر [The Life of Mirza Taqi Khan Amir Kabir] (in Persian).
- Mahmud, Mahmud. تاریخ روابط سیاسی ایران و انگلیس [History of the Political Relations between Iran and Britain] (PDF) (in Persian). Vol. 2 (4th ed.). Tehran.
- Etemad al-Saltaneh, Mohammad Hasan (1970). صدرالتواریخ [The History of Ministers] (in Persian). Tehran: Vahid Publishing Organization.
- Raein, Esmail (1994). حقوق‌بگیران انگلیس در ایران [British Pensioners in Iran] (in Persian) (9th ed.). Tehran: Elmi.
- Cole, Juan (1998). Modernity and the Millennium: The Genesis of the Bahá'í Faith in the Nineteenth Century. New York City, New York: Columbia University Press. ISBN 9780231110815.
- Amanat, Abbas (2017). Iran: A Modern History. Yale University Press. p. 245. ISBN 0300112548.
- Smith, Peter; Momen, Moojan (September 2005). "Martyrs, Babi". Encyclopaedia Iranica.
- Mahdavi, Houshang (1970). تاریخ روابط خارجی ایران [History of Iran's Foreign Relations] (in Persian) (1st ed.). Tehran: Sepehr.
- Najafi, Musa. تاریخ تحولات سیاسی ایران: بررسی مؤلفه‌های دین-حاکمیت-مدنیت و تکوین دولت-ملت در گستره هویت ملی ایران [History of Iran's Political Developments: An Examination of Religion, Sovereignty, Civility, and the Formation of the Nation-State within the Scope of Iranian National Identity)] (in Persian).
- Sasani, Khan Malek. سیاستگران دوره قاجار [Politicians of the Qajar Period] (in Persian). Vol. 1. Tehran: Babak.
- Rezaqoli, Ali. جامعه‌شناسی نخبه‌کشی [Sociology of Elite-Killing] (in Persian).
