= Seyd Morad Khan =

Shah of Iran in 1789

Seyd Morad Khan صید مراد خان
- Khan
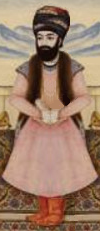

Shah of Iran
- Reign: January 23, 1789 – May 10, 1789
- Predecessor: Jafar Khan
- Successor: Lotf Ali Khan
- Born: Unknown; Malayer
- Died: 1789; Shiraz, Zand Iran
- Dynasty: Zand
- Father: Ali-Morad Khan Zand
- Religion: Twelver Shia Islam

Seyd Morad Khan (Persian: صید مراد خان), was the shah of Iran who reigned for about four months from January 23, 1789 until May 10, 1789. He was the seventh king of the Zand dynasty. His brief reign is indicative of the ruthless and brutal struggle for power that prevailed among members of the Zand family following the death of Karim Khan Zand in 1779.

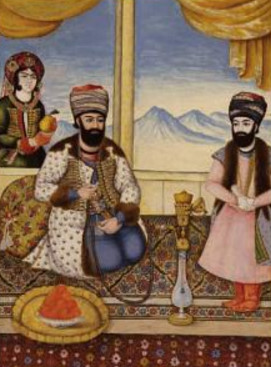
King Ali-Morad Khan Zand (centre), at his court beside an unnamed Princess (left) and his son: Prince Seyd Morad Khan (right)

== Life ==
Seyd Morad Khan was a member of the court of his predecessor, Jafar Khan, in the Zand capital of Shiraz. It was apparently Jafar Khan's treatment of Seyd Morad Khan that led the latter to plot the king's overthrow. Seyd Morad Khan had been governor of Shiraz but was later confined with his family and, according to one account beaten on Jafar Khan's orders in an effort to force him to divulge his wealth.

In 1789 a group of individuals, led by Seyd Morad Khan conspired to poison Jafar Khan. A female slave was employed to carry out their wishes. Seyd Morad Khan and his followers overcame the weakened shah, killing him, decapitating him and throwing his head from the citadel.

After the murder of Jafar Khan, Seyd Morad became the shah of Iran. Jafar Khan's son, Lotf Ali Khan, then marched to Shiraz, where he was popular among the people. Seyd Morad Khan held out for a short while in the city's citadel, but after reigning for less than 4 months he was forced to surrender and was executed. Lotf Ali Khan succeeded him on the throne on May 10, 1789.

== Sources ==
- Rajabi, Parviz (2010). کریم خان زند و زمان او [Karim Khan Zand and His Era] (in Persian).
- Perry, John R., Karim Khan Zand A History of Iran 1747–1779, ISBN 0-226-66098-2, Univ. of Chicago Press, 1979, pg. 299
- Perry, J. R. (2000). "ZAND DYNASTY". Encyclopædia Iranica, Online Edition.
- Waring, Edward Scott, "A Tour to Sheeraz by the Route of Kazroon and Feerozabad", ISBN 1-4021-4338-9, Elibron Classics, 2005.

Seyd Morad Khan Zand dynasty Born: ? Died: 1789
Iranian royalty
Preceded by Jafar Khan Zand	Shah of Iran; 1789	Succeeded by Lotf Ali Khan Zand
