= Hossein Ghods-Nakhai =

Iranian politician (1894-1977)

Hossein Ghods-Nakhai GCVO
- حسین قدس نخعی
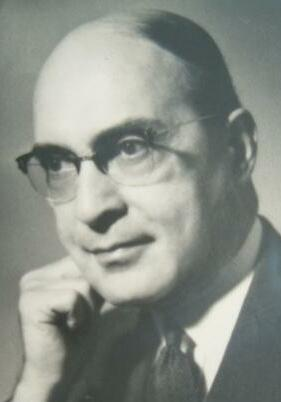
- Hossein Ghods-Nakhai, as Iranian ambassador to Japan, c. 1956–58

Foreign Minister of Iran
- In office 1 December 1960 – 30 December 1960
- Monarch: Mohammad Reza Pahlavi
- Prime Minister: Jafar Sharif-Emami
- Preceded by: Jafar Sharif-Emami
- Succeeded by: Abbas Aram

Personal details
- Born: 1894 Sari, Mazandaran province, Sublime State of Iran
- Died: 30 December 1977 Shiraz, Fars province, Imperial State of Iran
- Party: Nationalists' Party

Hossein Ghods-Nakhaï (Persian: حسین قدس نخعی; GCVO 1894–1977) was an Iranian politician, cabinet minister, diplomat, and poet.

== Early life ==
He was the son of the Iranian clerk, Hajj Agha Hasan Nakhai. His brother was Muhammad Nakhai, who served as the Secretary of the Iranian Legation in Brussels starting in 1928. Like his father, Hossein's surname was initially Nakhaï. In his youth, he was the editor of a literature magazine, called Ghods, and so became known as "Mr. Ghods". He then added the word Ghods to his surname. He was married to the daughter of the first Iranian ambassador to U.S., Sadr es-Saltaneh, also known as Haji Washington.

== Diplomatic and political career ==
He held the position of the minister of foreign affairs between 1961 and 1963. Before that he was ambassador to Baghdad, London, Tokyo (October 1956 to January 1958), and to Washington, D.C. (in the 1960s, during John F. Kennedy administration). Afterwards, he was appointed as the minister of the Royal Court, a post he held until 1968. He was replaced as the minister of court by Asadollah Alam. Afterwards, he became the ambassador to the Holy See (Vatican).

He was the chairman of the committee that negotiated with the Soviet Union on the return of Iranian gold deposited with the Tsarist regime.

== Literary life ==
Nakhaï wrote extensive volumes of poetry (including his Rubaiyat), and prose (including "Trail lost in heaven"). Some of his works have been translated into English and other languages.
