= Khajeh Nouri family =

Iranian aristocratic family

Khajeh Nouri
- Persian Noble Family
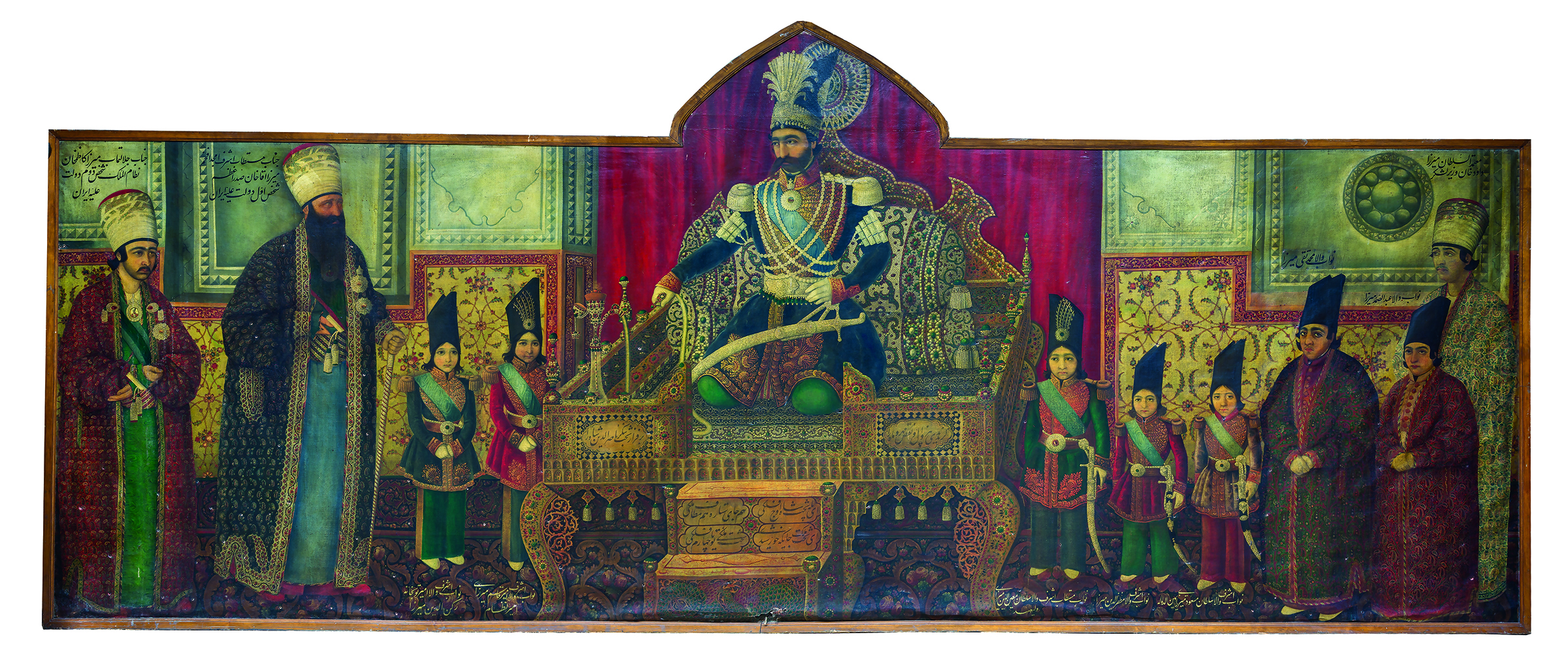
- A mural in the Nizamiyeh mansion. Mirza Aqa Khan Nuri is seen as the Prime Minister.
- Etymology: Lord of Noor / Light (Persian)
- Place of origin: Noor, Sublime State of Iran
- Titles: Khajeh (Lord); Mirza

The Khajeh-Nouri —alternatively transliterated as Khajenouri, Khajenoori, Khwajahnuri, Xojanori, Khajeh-Noori, Khajehnoori, etc.— family is one of the most prominent aristocratic families in the contemporary history of Iran, emerging from the ancient imperial era. The family originated from the Baladeh area in Mazandaran, and held local power during the late Safavid, Afshari, and Zand dynasties. From the beginning of the Qajar era, the family entered politics through bureaucratic and military positions. The family was based in Tehran, where they served in the Qajar court. Throughout the Qajar and Pahlavi eras the Khajeh Nouri family held high political positions and strong relations with the dynasties. The name translates to "Lord of Light" in Persian.

The most famous figure was Mirza Aga Khan Nouri, who was the Prime Minister of Iran during the reign of Naser al-Din Shah Qajar.

Khajeh Nouri's family had ties to many aristocratic families of the Qajar era and belonged to a group of the ruling class that was called the "Thousand Families" by opponents of the monarchy before the Islamic Revolution.

== History ==
The oldest known information about the Khajeh Noori family dates back to the late Safavid era. During the reign of Shah Abbas II, Noor belonged to the family and the elders ruled the area. The first known ancestor of the Nouri family is Haji Mohammad Akbar. After him, there is information about his two sons named Taherbig and Khajeh Abdal Bey. It is said that Khajeh Abdal Bey was the "ruler of Aghasi" during the reign of Shah Abbas II, the ruler of Behshahr and his brother Tahir Beg. Khajeh Abdel Bey had seven sons. His son, Mirza Aghababa, is the father of Mirza Assadollah, Mirza Mohammadzaki and Mirza Nasrollah and the ancestor of the Nouri families of Tehran and Shiraz, and his fit son, Aghahadi is the ancestor of the Nouri family in Isfahan. Mirza Aghababa was the first member of the Khajeh Nouri family to take office in the Qajar dynasty.

== Post-Revolution ==
During the revolution and when many members of the family were executed by the regime, many permanently settled outside of Iran where the family already held assets in and where they were educated. They fled to Europe, London and the United States.

== Notable family members ==
Summary	Profession	Lifespan	Name	Picture
Prime Minister of Persia from 1830 to 1858	Politician	1807-1865	Mirza Khan Nouri	
Vice-Chancellor from 1853 to 1858, Ruler of Yazd (1873), Minister of Justice, Minister of Division	Politician	1830- 1889	Mirza Kazem Nizam al–Mulk	
The ruler of Mazandaran, the representative of the second term of the National Assembly, the ruler of Boroujerd and Lorestan, the member of the presidium of the third term of the National Assembly, the governor of Sistan and Kerman	Diplomat	1834 – 1899	Amir Aslan Khan Nizam al-Dawlah	
Ruler of Tehran, Minister of Division, Minister of Finance, Ruler of Persia from 1898 to 1899, Minister of Justice, Ruler of Azerbaijan	Politician	1848-1916	Abdul Wahab Khan Nizam al-Mulk	
Deputy Secretary of State, Iranian Ambassador to India, Iran's First Ambassador to the United States, Minister of Public Works. Married Nasir-ad-din Shah's daughter.	Diplomat & Politician	1849–1937	Hajji Hossein-Gholi Khan Noori (Known as "Haji Washington")	
Lashkarnavis, Bashi and Deputy Minister of Lashkar	Politician		Mirza Nematullah, Director of the Sultanate	
Father of Iranian Civil Registration, Mayor of Shiraz (1888) and Tehran (1899), ruler of Khorasan	Politician		Amirnosrat Khajeh Nouri	
Diplomat in Italy.	Diplomat	1896 - 1961	Ghulam Ali Khajeh Nouri	
Founding member of the Justice Party, Director General of the Propaganda Office and Deputy Prime Minister in the cabinets of Ali Soheili, Ahmad Qavam and Mohammad Saed. Senator of Tehran during the first term of the Senate. Founder of the School of Refugees and translator of several Psychology Books.	Politician, Psychologist and author.	1900- 1991	Ibrahim Khajeh Nouri	
A close friend of Princess Ashraf Pahlavi. Leading up to the Islamic revolution, she was killed in an assassination attempt on her and the Princess's life in Monaco.			Forough Khaje Nouri	
A judicial General in the Imperial Army and head of its courts. He was executed on March 5, 1979 by the Islamic Regime.	Military		Abdullah Khajeh Nouri	
Managing Director of the Ministry of Labor and Member of the National Assembly. Executed on September 24, 1979.			Mohsen Khajeh Nouri	
A pioneering figure as one of the first professional bass guitar players in Iran. Mr. Khajeh Nouri played a crucial role in shaping the talents of Fereydoon Foroughi, serving as his first guitar master, and also contributed to the early musical education of Lily Afshar. Throughout his career, he collaborated closely with Persian music icons such as Googoosh and Sattar. He died in December 2023 at the age of 77.	Musician	1946 – 2023	Homayoun Khajeh Nouri	
