= Hezar, Fars =

Hezar هزار
- Village
- Location within Iran
- Coordinates: 29°53′11″N 52°31′08″E
- Country: Iran
- Province: Fars
- County: Sepidan
- Bakhsh: Beyza
- Rural District: Kushk-e Hezar

Population (2006)
  - Total: 1,107
- Time zone: UTC+3:30 (IRST)
  - Summer (DST): UTC+4:30 (IRDT)

Hezar (Persian: هزار, also Romanized as Hezār) is a village in Kushk-e Hezar Rural District, Beyza District, Sepidan County, Fars province, Iran. At the 2006 census, its population was 1,107, in 263 families.
