= E'temad ol-Dowleh =

Persian honorific title

E'temad ol-Dowleh (Persian: اعتمادالدوله) was a honorific title commonly held by the grand viziers of Iran. During the Safavid era, Mirza Shah Hossein was the first recorded grand vizier to have been called E'temad od-Dowleh.

The title along with the grand vizier office was abolished during the reign of Nader Shah (r. 1736–1747). Afterwards, during the Zand era, it was rarely used. Although the title of E'temad ol-Dowleh became popular again during the Qajar era, it was mostly ceremonial and was not reserved for a specific office. During the reign of Naser al-Din Shah Qajar (r. 1848–1896), the title was bestowed to Mirza Aqa Khan Nuri and Isa Khan Qajar.

== Sources ==
- Floor, Willem (2001). Safavid Government Institutions. Mazda Publishers. ISBN 978-1568591353.
- Samii, Majid (2019). "اعتماد الدوله". Center for the Great Islamic Encyclopedia (in Persian).
