= Hossein Qoli Khan Qajar =

18th century Qajar chieftain

Jahansuz Shah
- Hossein Qoli Khan Qajar
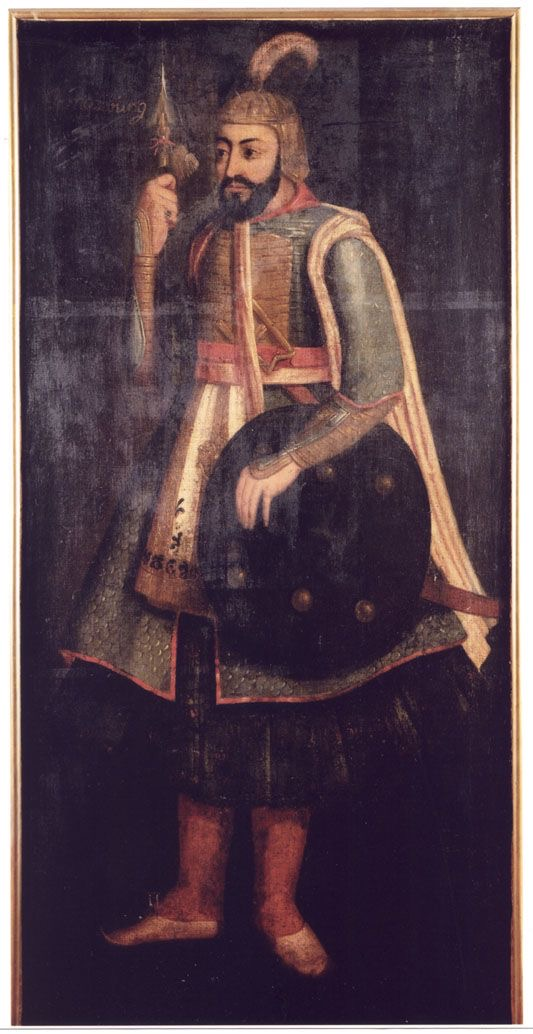

Governor of Damghan

Hakem
- In office February 1769 – 1777

Personal details
- Born: 1751 Astarabad, Iran
- Died: c. 1777 Findarisk, Zand Iran
- Spouse: Asiye Khanum Ezzeddin Qajar
- Children: Fath-Ali Shah Qajar
- Parents: Mohammad Hasan Khan Qajar (father); Jeeran Khanum (mother)

Hossein Qoli Khan Qajar (Persian: حسینقلی‌خان قاجار), also known by his epithet Jahansuz Shah, was the Qajar chieftain of the Qoyunlu branch from 1759 till his death in 1777 and brother of the founder of the Qajar dynasty of Iran Agha Mohammad Khan Qajar.

== Biography ==
=== Background ===
He belonged to the Qoyunlu (also spelled Qawanlu) branch of the Qajar tribe. The tribe had several other branches, one of the most prominent ones being the Develu, which often fought against the Qoyunlu. Hossein Qoli Khan was one of the youngest sons of the chieftain of the Qoyunlu clan, Mohammad Hasan Khan Qajar, and the grandson of Fath Ali Khan, a prominent aristocrat executed by the orders of shah Tahmasp II (possibly at the urging of Nader Qoli Beg, who would become known as Nader Shah after usurping the throne of Iran in 1736, marking the foundation of the Afsharid dynasty). Hossein Qoli Khan had several half-brothers and full-brothers: Agha Mohammad Khan Qajar, Morteza Qoli Khan, Mostafa Qoli Khan, Reza Qoli Khan, Jafar Qoli Khan, Mahdi Qoli Khan, Abbas Qoli Khan Qajar and Ali Qoli Khan. When Nader Shah died in 1747, the Afsharid rule of Iran fell apart, which gave Mohammad Hasan the opportunity to try to seize Astarabad for himself, leading Nader Shah's nephew Adel Shah to march from Mashhad to the city in order to capture him. Although he failed to catch Hasan, Adel Shah managed to take castrate one of his sons, Agha Mohammad Khan.

=== The death of Mohammad Hasan ===
During the following 10 years, Afsharid rule in Khorasan suffered heavily from war among rival chieftains and from invasions by the Durrani ruler of Kandahar, Ahmad Shah Durrani. During this period, Mohammad Hasan fought against the Pashtun military leader Azad Khan Afghan and the Zand ruler Karim Khan for suzerainty over the western part of Nader Shah's former empire. He was, however, defeated in 1759 by a Zand army, and thereafter betrayed by his own followers and killed by his old rival, Mohammad Khan of Savadkuh. Due to Agha Mohammad Khan's castration, Hossein Qoli Khan was appointed as the new chieftain of the Qoyunlu instead. Shortly thereafter, Astarabad fell under the control of Karim Khan, who appointed a Develu named Hosayn Khan Develu as its governor. Meanwhile, Hossein Qoli Khan and his brother Agha Mohammad Khan fled to the steppe. One year later, Agha Mohammad Khan made an incursion against Astarabad, but was forced to flee, chased by the city's governor. Agha Mohammad Khan managed to reach Ashraf, but was at last seized and was sent as a hostage to Tehran, where Karim Khan was. Hossein Qoli Khan was also soon captured and sent to Karim Khan.

In 1763, Hossein Qoli Khan and Agha Mohammad Khan were sent to the Zand capital, Shiraz, where their paternal aunt Khadijeh Begum, who was part of Karim Khan's harem, lived. Agha Mohammad Khan's half-brothers Morteza Qoli Khan and Mostafa Qoli Khan were granted permission to live in Astarabad, due to their mother being the sister of the governor of the city. His remaining brothers were sent to Qazvin, where they were treated honourably.

In February 1769, Karim Khan appointed Hossein Qoli Khan as the governor of Damghan. When Hossein Qoli Khan reached Damghan, he immediately began a fierce conflict with the Develu and other tribes to avenge his father's death. He was, however, killed ca. 1777 near Findarisk by some Turks from the Yamut tribe with whom he had clashed. He was survived by his two sons—Hossein Qoli and Baba Khan (later 2nd ruler of the Qajar dynasty known as Fath-Ali Shah Qajar).

== Sources ==
- Amanat, Abbas (1997). "Ebrāhīm Kalāntar Šīrāzī". Encyclopaedia Iranica, Vol. III, Fasc. 1. pp. 66–71.
- Bakhash, S. (1983). "Administration in Iran vi. Safavid, Zand, and Qajar periods". Encyclopaedia Iranica, Vol. I, Fasc. 5. pp. 462–466.
- Perry, J. R. (1984). "Āḡā Moḥammad Khan Qājār". Encyclopaedia Iranica, Vol. I, Fasc. 6. pp. 602–605.
- Ghani, Cyrus (2001). Iran and the Rise of the Reza Shah: From Qajar Collapse to Pahlavi Power. I.B.Tauris. pp. 1–434. ISBN 9781860646294. Archived from the original on 2018-02-09.
- Daryaee, Touraj (2012). The Oxford Handbook of Iranian History. Oxford University Press. pp. 1–432. ISBN 978-0199875757. Archived from the original on 2019-01-01.
- Hambly, Gavin R.G (1991). "Agha Muhammad Khan and the establishment of the Qajar dynasty". The Cambridge History of Iran, Vol. 7: From Nadir Shah to the Islamic Republic. Cambridge: Cambridge University Press. pp. 104–144. ISBN 9780521200950.
- Bosworth, Clifford Edmund (2007). Historic Cities of the Islamic World. BRILL. pp. 1–615. ISBN 9789004153882. Archived from the original on 2017-03-16.
- Amanat, Abbas (1997). Pivot of the Universe: Nasir Al-Din Shah Qajar and the Iranian Monarchy, 1831-1896. University of California Press. pp. 1–536. ISBN 9780520083219. Archived from the original on 2017-04-19.
- Perry, John R. (2011). "Karim Khan Zand". Encyclopaedia Iranica, Vol. XV, Fasc. 6. pp. 561–564.
- Suny, Ronald Grigor (1994). The Making of the Georgian Nation. Indiana University Press. p. 55. ISBN 0253209153. Archived from the original on 2018-02-09.
