= Zand campaigns in Western Iran =

Series of wars over Western Iran (1747-1794)

- Map of Zand Iran
| Date | 1747–1779 |
| Location | Western Iran, Fars, Golestan, Azerbaijan, Iran |

Belligerents
| Zand Iran | Bakhtiari; Lurs; Afshars of Urmia; Afghans |

Commanders and leaders
| Karim Khan Zand; Sadeq Khan Zand; Shaykh Ali Khan Zand; Mohammad Khan Zand; Eskandar Khan Zand; Kamar Khan Zand | Mohammad Hasan; Agha Mohammad; Ali Mardan Khan; Azad Khan Afghan; Fath-Ali Khan Afshar 'Abd ol-'Ali; Mohammad Taqi |

The Zand campaigns in Western Iran were several military campaigns by the Zand dynasty which began when Karim Khan Zand led the first expansion by Zand Iran to expand his influence to the Kurdish and Luri tribes of the Zagros. It was sporadic and simultaneous with several other conflicts involving the Zands, including conflicts with the Qajars, Afghans, and Afshars.

== History ==
=== Origins of the Zand tribe and background under Nader Shah ===
The Zand dynasty was Lak, from the Malayer region, specifically the villages of Deh Pari and Kamazan. The ethnic origin of Laks was disputed, as some of them identified as Kurds, others as Lurs, others as both Kurds and Lurs, and others as solely Laks. The dispute extended to the Zand tribe as well, with groups bearing the name Zand varyingly identifying as Kurds or Lurs. Malayer was part of the Pish-e-Kuh region. The Laks were divided into two main groups, the Laks of Pish-e-Kuh (lit. in front of the mountain, current Lorestan province) and Posht-e-Kuh (lit. behind the mountain, current Ilam province). The two groups were distinct from each other. By the 21st century, the Laks of Pish-e-Kuh identified strongly as Lurs, whereas the Laks of Posht-e-Kuh were generally fluid in their ethnic identity and alternatively identified as Kurds or Lurs. Some Laks in both regions identified as Lak only.

The Zand dynasty, as Laks, had always distinguished themselves from the Feyli Vali dynasty of Luristan and the Ardalan dynasty of Kurdistan, which were Luri and Kurdish autonomous entities that both emerged during the Safavid era. Under Nader Shah, Kurds and Lurs constituted important elements of the army. Nader Shah exiled many Kurdish and Luri tribes to Khorasan. He was assassinated in 1747 due to perceived favoritism towards his Afghan and Uzbek soldiers over the Iranian ones. After his death, his army split. Several tribes which he exiled to Khorasan began to return home, including the Zands, led by Karim Khan, who began as an unknown foot-soldier but had risen to a general under Nader Shah.

=== Rise of Karim Khan and power struggles (1747–1751) ===
In the late 1740s and early 1750s, in the area of Isfahan, a power struggle broke out between Ali Mardan Khan, a Chahar Lang Bakhtiari leader who was an important general for Nader Shah, as well as Abolfath Khan, a Haft Lang Bakhtiari leader who served as governor of Isfahan, and Karim Khan Zand. Abolfath Khan led 50,000 warriors, Ali Mardan Khan led 20,000 warriors, while Karim Khan initially led 8,000 warriors, later increasing to 12,000 with recruitment from Kamazan and Deh Pari and the absorption of defeated rival troops.

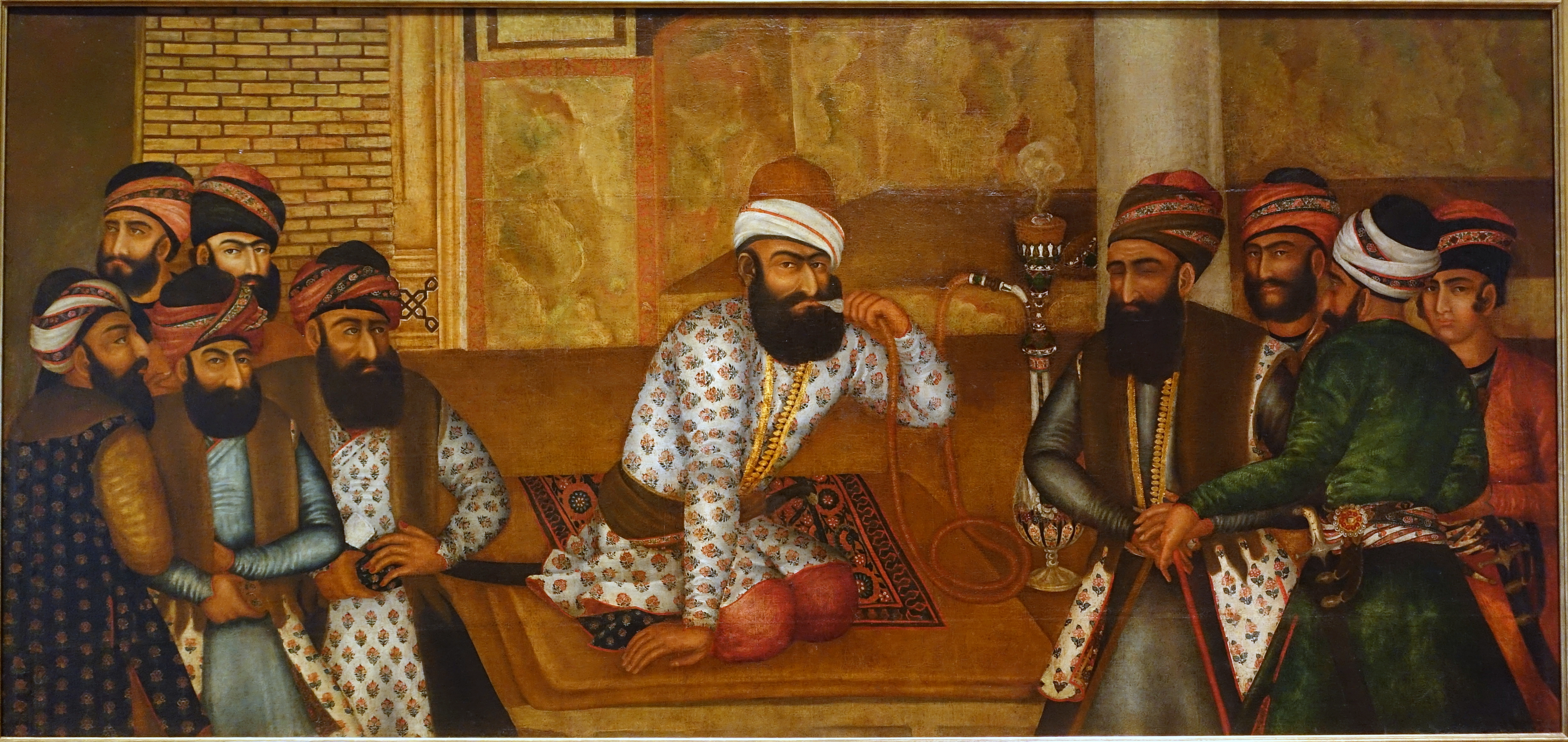
Karim Khan Zand amidst his close circle, sometimes attributed to Mohammad Sadeq, probably 19th century.

Karim Khan was also supported by Zakariya Khan, who ruled Kazzaz and Borojerd, as well as the support of 2,000 Qaraquzlu warriors from Hamadan. Karim Khan rejected an alliance from Mehr-Ali Khan Tekkelu of Hamadan and defeated him, causing Mehr-Ali Khan to call of Hasan Ali Khan, the Vali of Ardalan, for help, who fought the Zands for over a month until they were forced to retreat due to a crisis in Golpayegan in April–May 1750. Karim Khan and Zakariya Khan defeated the Bakhtiaris and captured Golpayegan, although they lost it to Ali Mardan Khan just as Karim Khan went west to fight Mehr-Ali Khan Tekkelu of Hamadan. From Golpayegan, Ali Mardan Khan attempted to capture Isfahan from Abolfath Khan in spring 1750 but was defeated in Murchekhor. Ali Mardan Khan entered an alliance with Karim Khan, and later captured Isfahan in May 1750.

The three khans came to an agreement to place Abu Torab, a 17 year old descendant of the Safavids, on the throne as Shah Ismail III by 29 June 1750, in a ceremony attended by a coalition of many Bakhtiari, Kurdish, and Luristani tribes which proclaimed the Safavid prince as shah. Abu Torab was symbolic, and the real power was held by the three khans. Ali Mardan Khan, who became viceroy, was able to keep his private Bakhtiari army, while Karim Khan as the commander of the Iranian army, and Abolfath Khan was the governor of Isfahan. Karim Khan then defeated Mehr-Ali Khan Tekkelu for a third time and occupied Hamadan. Negotiations at Kermanshah failed, leading to the Zands sacking Sanandaj, despite Hasan Ali not being prepared and having been diplomatically compliant.

The agreement between the three khans did not hold, with Karim Khan returning to Luristan and beginning the campaign to expand his influence in western Iran, especially in Luristan and Kurdistan, meanwhile Ali Mardan Khan killed Abolfath Khan in Isfahan, and conquered the province of Fars and the city of Shiraz with the help of Shah Ismail III. In February 1751 in Chaharmahal, Karim Khan completely defeated Ali Mardan Khan. Shah Ismail III joined Karim Khan. While some captured Bakhtiari leaders were blinded and executed, the ordinary Bakhtiari foot-soldiers of Ali Mardan Khan were treated well and incorporated into the Zand army. The incorporation of defeated troops was becoming a Zand policy. Ali Mardan Khan, as well as his ally Ismail Khan Faili, the Vali of Luristan, and his loyalists hastily retreated to Khuzistan. The Zands then focused on capturing the Kermanshah fortress.

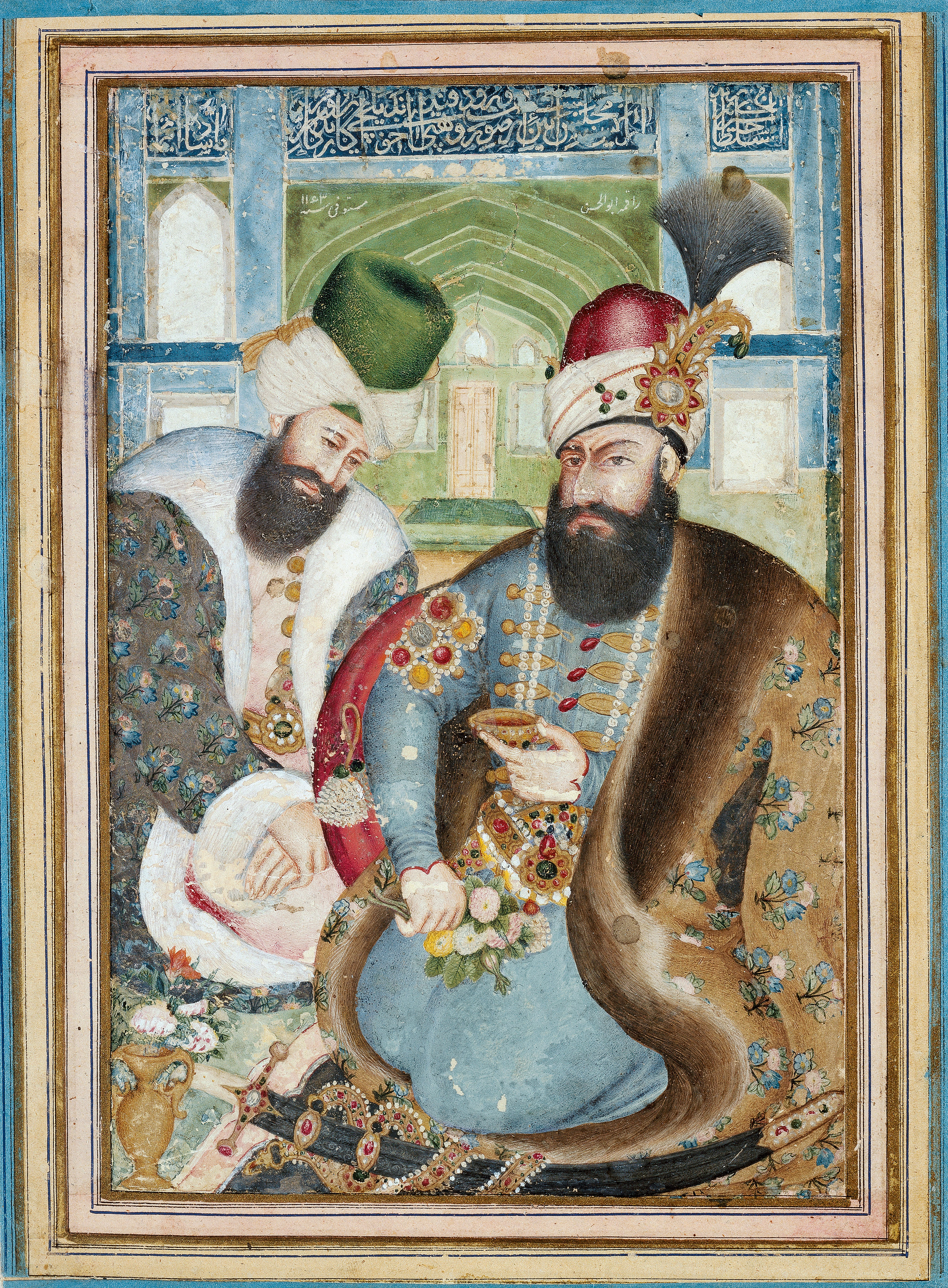
Karim Khan Zand with the Ottoman Ambassador Vehbi Effendi, 1775

=== Consolidation through conflict with Ali Mardan Khan (1751–1754) ===
After Ali Mardan Khan retreated to Khuzestan, he obtained troops from the vali of Khuzestan, Sheikh Saad of the Al-Kathir Arab tribe. Ali Mardan had also secured the support of Lurs led by Ismail Khan. Ali Mardan Khan and his new force marched towards Kermanshah in spring 1752 and joined its garrison. The Zands, led by Mohammad Khan, attempted to intercept them, but were repelled with heavy losses. Ali Mardan then deployed into Zand territories, although Karim Khan was waiting near Nahavand, and inflicted a serious defeat upon Ali Mardan Khan in spring or early summer 1752. Ali Mardan Khan fled westwards into Ottoman territory towards Baghdad.

As the Zands were about to resume their siege of Kermanshah, Karim Khan was soon challenged by the Qajars based in Astrabad led by Mohammad Hassan Khan, a son of Fath-Ali Khan. Karim Khan left the Kalhor and Zangana, the two most powerful Kurdish tribes of Kermanshah, fight against the aggressors. Mohammad Hassan Khan attempted to march to Kermanshah and join its garrison, but was defeated, with Karim Khan further sending 45,000 troops and beginning the siege of Astrabad and Mohammad Hassan Khan's 35,000 mainly Turkmen troops. Karim Khan retreated after 12,000 of his troops were killed and 15,000 were captured.

Karim Khan spent winter 1752 in Tehran, returning to Isfahan in early 1753 to fight Ali Mardan Khan. In spring 1753, Ali Mardan Khan, Mustafa Khan, and Ismail Khan, the vali of Luristan, had raised a new army in Luristan and attempted to expand in the Zagros as Azad Khan Afghan promised them help when he arrived. The Ottomans also promoted a Safavid pretender named Shah Sultan Hussein II, an ally of Ali Mardan Khan. As Ali Mardan Khan marched towards Kermanshah, Shah Sultan Hussein II disappointingly had a bad impact on Ali Mardan Khan's cause, and Karim Khan quickly marched towards Kermanshah which fell in 1753 after being besieged by the Zands for two years. The defenders of Kermanshah fortress, Muhammad Taqi and Abd al-Ali, were tired and surrendered to the Zands after the promised help from Ali Mardan Khan did not arrive. Ali Mardan Khan was quickly defeated as he was waiting for support from Azad Khan.

After losing to the Zands, Ali Mardan Khan blinded the Safavid pretender and sent him to Ottoman Iraq. In spring 1754, Muhammad Khan and Ali Khan Zand were at Chamchamal in Kermanshah, when Ali Mardan Khan took them to his camp at a nearby gorge and surprised them with hospitality. However, realizing that talks of an alliance were getting nowhere, and that the only viable solution was to kill Ali Mardan Khan, Ali Khan Zand gave a signal to Muhammad Khan, who physically overpowered Ali Mardan Khan and killed him with his own dagger. Karim Khan's most powerful Lur opponent had been killed. The Zand captives overpowered the Lurs of Ismail Khan, taking their weapons and rejoining Karim Khan. In spring 1754, Azad Khan dealt much damage to the Zands, causing them to spend winter in the hills of Bakhtiari and Luristan, supported at Khorramabad by the Feyli Lurs, although their last Lur allies had slipped away at Silakhur near Borujerd when they lost cohesion in the winter.

The Feyli Lurs of the Vali dynasty had long tensions with Karim Khan Zand. Ismail Khan, the Vali of Lorestan, ruled over a large Lak population and thus feared becoming subordinate to Karim Khan Zand. The Vali dynasty considered itself superior as it claimed descent from Abbas ibn Ali and was installed by the Safavids. Ismail Khan believed that only Alids should rule Iran and was worried by the rise of the Zands, local Laks of more humble origin. Regarding submission to Karim Khan Zand as dishonorable, Ismail Khan emphasized his Alid ancestry and united the Feyli Lurs in his support, creating much difficulties for the Zand dynasty. Although some tribes in Lorestan, which were related to the Zands or mistreated by Ismail Khan, had supported the Zands, they were few and were under severe pressure from the Vali dynasty and its allied tribes.

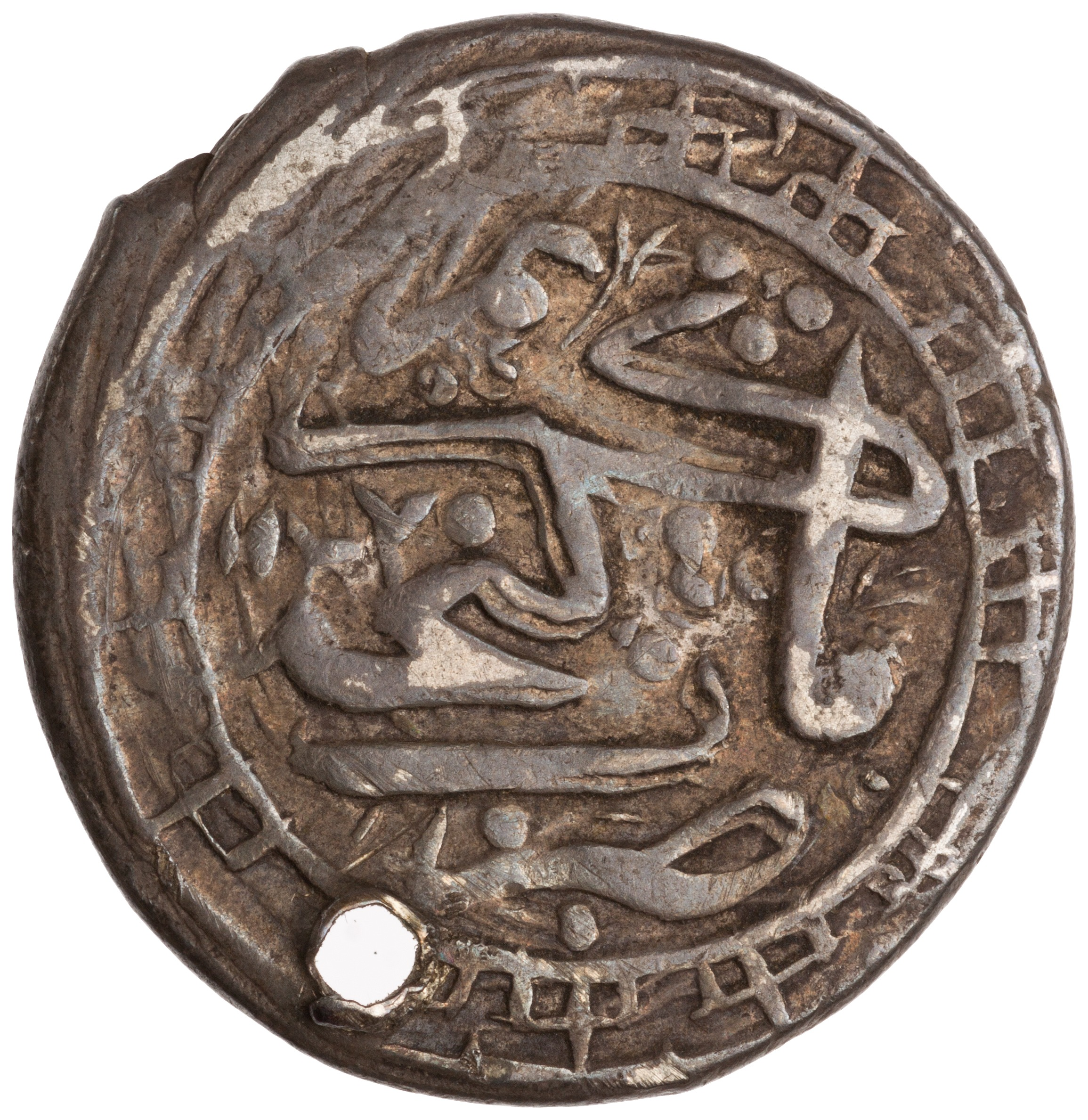
Coin of Karim Khan Zand minted in Ganja

=== Wars with the Qajars and Azad Khan Afghan (1752–1759) ===
The Zands later faced several challenges, mainly Azad Khan Afghan and the Qajars. Karim Khan defeated both and consolidated control of northern and northwestern Iran, although he had no authority in western Iran, especially among Lurs, Khuzestan, and the Yazd and Kerman. Yazd and Kerman had been practically independent by the late 1750s due to Karim Khan being focused on Azad Khan and the Qajars immediately after. On 14 February 1759, a Kurdish renegade killed Muhammad Hasan Khan Qajar as he was fleeing battle, and Astarabad fell to the Zands.

In summer 1760, Azad Khan was fully defeated in Azerbaijan and had lost everything, and fled for Kurdistan where he failed to get support from either Kurds or Sulaiman Pasha. He fled to Azerbaijan, and two years later, the Zands captured Azerbaijan and kept him prisoner. In Qara Choman, Shahbaz Khan Dunbuli was captured and defected to the Zands while Fath Ali Khan Afshar fled to Urmia, the last fortress in Western Iran outside of Zand rule. Shahbaz Khan Dunbuli and Fath Ali Khan Afshar had been Qajar allies until 1758 when they defected after the Zands defeated the Qajars. In February 1763, the Zands captured Urmia after a seven month siege amid the resistance of the garrison, severe winter, and raids by local Kurds.

The Kurds of Ardalan, which had autonomy since the Safavid era, initially fought against the Zands in 1750 alongside Mehr-Ali Khan Tekkelu. In 1759, the Ardalan gave their allegiance to Karim Khan Zand and kept their autonomy. In 1774, war broke out between the Zands and the Ottomans, on two fronts, in Kurdistan and in Shatt al-Arab. The war in Kurdistan also involved the principality of Baban, centered around Sulaymaniyah, and principality of Ardalan. After the death of Sulaiman Pasha of Baghdad in 1762, the Baban, which were Ottoman allies, were increasingly falling under the influence of the Ardalan, who were Zand allies. Thus, Umar Pasha replaced the ruler of the Baban in 1774, sparking a campaign by the Zands and Ardalan to restore their influence in Baban. The Ardalan were the closest allies of the Zands and remained so throughout Zand rule. After the Qajars overthrew the Zands, the Ardalan gave allegiance to the Qajars and kept their autonomy.

=== Internal dissent and the Zaki Khan rebellion (1762–1764) ===
The Zands remained loyal to Karim Khan during his reign, except Zaki Khan, his half-brother and cousin. Zaki Khan was possibly disappointed at the lack of appreciation for his role at Qara Chaman in 1762. After the battle, Zaki Khan left for Tehran and attacked Sheikh Ali's baggage train, afterwards managing to obtain the support of Mohammad Ali Khan Zand against Karim Khan. Zaki Khan and his allies struck at Isfahan and Kashan, inflicting much pain on civilians specifically. Bakhtiari supporters of Zaki Khan had convinced Ali Muhammad Khan Zand, governor of Borujerd, to renounce allegiance to Karim Khan and to support Zaki Khan. Zaki Khan was virtually unchallenged while Karim Khan was busy in Azarbaijan, finally intervening in October 1763, nine months after the conclusion of his campaigns in Azarbaijan. The Zands deployed from Ardabil straight towards Isfahan and Kashan, where Zaki Khan fled to Khuzestan through the Bakhtiari mountains, where he was joined by his Bakhtiari supporters and Feyli Lur allies. His baggage train and a number of hostages had been captured by the advance guard units of Nazar-Ali Khan Zand.

When Zaki Khan arrived in Khuzestan, he requested help from the vali of Khuzestan, Molla Muttaleb, the sheikh of the Mushasha. Molla Muttaleb, who was angry with a defiant governor in Dezful, used Zaki Khan's forces to march towards Dezful to subdue the city. However, he soon regretted his association with Zaki Khan and his dispatch to Dezful. When Zaki Khan approached Dezful, he recruited warriors of the Al-Kathir Arab tribe, rivals of Molla Muttaleb, into his forces. Soon Zaki Khan turned against the vali, resulting in the formation of a three-way entente against Muttaleb consisting of Zaki Khan, the Al-Kathir, and the governor of Dezful. Mohammad Ali Khan abducted Muttaleb and killed his whole family. The vali was a prisoner of Zaki Khan, and was very anxious about being transferred to the custody of the Al-Kathir. He paid Zaki Khan a heavy ransom, although Zaki Khan handed him over to the Al-Kathir anyway, who predictably executed him. The Al-Kathir then turned against Zaki Khan, who fled back into the Bakhtiari mountains, and ran straight into the forces of Nazar-Ali Khan Zand in early 1764. Zaki Khan declared his full submission to Karim Khan and was pardoned.

Portrait of Azad Khan Afghan as a Zand captive

=== Tribal pacification and regional control under Karim Khan (1764–1769) ===
Even after the defeat of their leader Ali Mardan Khan, the Bakhtiaris continued to be restless and defy the central authorities, as they remembered their high status under the Safavids and Afshars and how Ali Mardan Khan almost became ruler of Iran before losing it to the Zands. In early 1764, having retaken Isfahan, Karim Khan became strict against the Bakhtiaris, sending troops to Zardeh Kuh to impose his authority and disarm as many Bakhtiaris as possible. During the campaign, the Haft-Lang Bakhtiari were resettled in the Qom and Varamin regions, while the Chahar-Lang Bakhtiaris were resettled in Fasa in Fars province. 3,000 Bakhtiari warriors were also recruited into the Zand army. The Feyli Lurs were a bigger challenge for the Zands, as the Feylis had not retracted their defiance against Karim Khan which was instigated by Zaki Khan earlier. In winter 1764, Karim Khan began the campaign against the Feyli Lurs, and by early 1765, Karim Khan's army successfully entered Khorramabad. Ismail Khan Feyli, the vali of Luristan, fled to Ottoman Iraq. Karim Khan then placed Ismail Khan's more compliant brother as the vali of Luristan. While the Zand campaigns had fully subdued the Bakhtiaris, they were less successful on the Feyli Lurs, as Ismail Khan Feyli soon returned to power in Luristan and retained his influence during the Zand period. Karim Khan then thrust into northern Khuzistan, defeating the Banu Lam, which had assisted Ismail Khan, and the Al-Kathir. By March 1765, the Zands were in control of Dezful and Shushtar and Karim Khan celebrated Nowruz there. However, there were more issues in Khuzistan and the Persian Gulf, later on in Karim Khan's reign which required his attention again. Around two months after celebrating Nowruz in Khuzistan, Karim Khan and the Zand army marched back to Shiraz. In 1757, Karim Khan began a campaign in Behbehan to impose his authority, blockading and sacking the city, and then sieging Jayizan for eight months in the summer until it fell. Much of the Kuhguliye mountains was pacified in 1757. When Karim Khan was in Azarbaijan in 1760, one of the officials he appointed to govern the Kuhgiluye Lurs had revolted. While he was captured, the area remained outside of Zand control until spring 1765, when all gave allegiance to Karim Khan when he returned from Khuzestan. The Liravi Lurs, however, refused to accept Zand authority, and desperately resisted the Zand advance on their two fortresses near Behbehan, which fell to the Zands after high casualties on both sides. The Zands did not give any leniency to the Liravi, and began killing the prisoners and building towers out of their skulls as a warning to other Liravis. Nami Isfahani, the historian of Tarikh-i Gitigusha, who had criticized some members of the Zand dynasty for causing anarchy and internal disorder, had also called the Lurs of Kohgiluyeh 'savage-natured, beast-dispositioned, and fox-like deceivers', who were punished by Karim Khan.

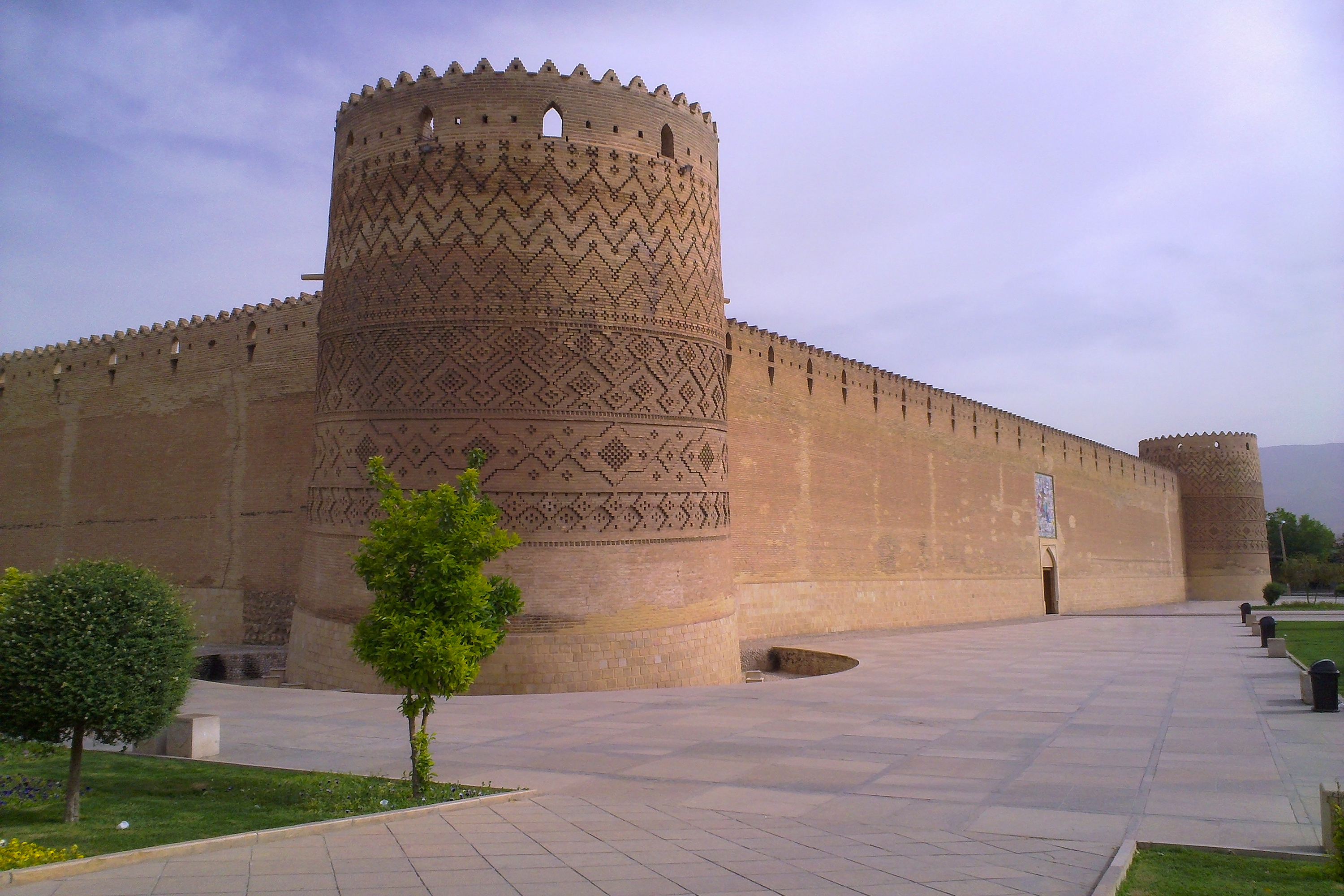
Arg of Karim Khan, Shiraz

=== Tribal policy and power-sharing ===
Karim Khan had given privileges to Kurds and Lurs, as they formed his main support base. They formed a large part of the army, and were able to govern their own regions. The unfavored tribes had their power reduced at the request of the government. Some tribes were practically independent in their own regions, as the coercion of the central government was insufficient, or the central government did not pay attention to their desire for independence.

Before the Zands, the most powerful elites of the economy, military, and political establishment of Iran were Turkic rather than Iranian. The Turks had been dominant under the Safavids and Afsharids, although under Karim Khan, the Lurs and Kurds gained the ascendancy. However, the Turkic ruling class was later restored by the Qajars. Karim Khan settled many Kurdish and Luri tribes in the Zand capital of Shiraz to solidify his rule. The bulk of Karim Khan's soldiers were Kurds, Lurs, and Laks.

=== Succession crisis after Karim Khan’s death (1779–1781) ===
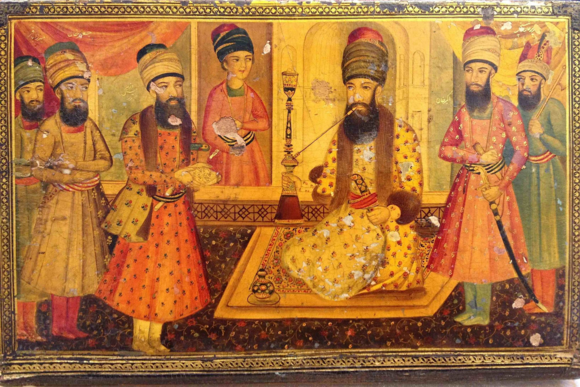
Sadeq Khan Zand, Karim's brother, in his court.

After Karim Khan died in 1779, Zaki Khan tried to seize power, executing 23 khans in only three days, seizing their assets, and using them to finance his troops. Zaki Khan easily dispersed the supporters of Abol Fath Khan, but later was faced with the challenge of Ali Morad Khan, who was one of Karim Khan's highest commanders. Ali Morad Khan had mobilized his supporters in Isfahan, after which Zaki Khan hastily assembled an army of 20,000 men, without providing them with proper weapons or training. Zaki Khan's fighters attempted to enter Isfahan quietly, although soon after their arrival, a group of Mafi Lur tribe leaders entered Zaki Khan's tent and shot him, ending rule of 100 days. Abolfath Khan was chosen as shah, although he only ruled for 70 days before being overthrown by Sadegh Khan in a military coup in Shiraz. Ali Morad Khan and Sadegh Khan were involved in a fierce power struggle, although Ali Morad Khan had won after some of Sadegh Khan's starving soldiers rebelled and stormed the Bagh-e-Shah gate of Shiraz, allowing Ali Morad Khan's troops to enter in February 1781, arresting and blinding Sadegh Khan before killing him in prison a few months later. Ali Morad Khan relocated to Isfahan and then focused on the rise of the Qajars in the north.

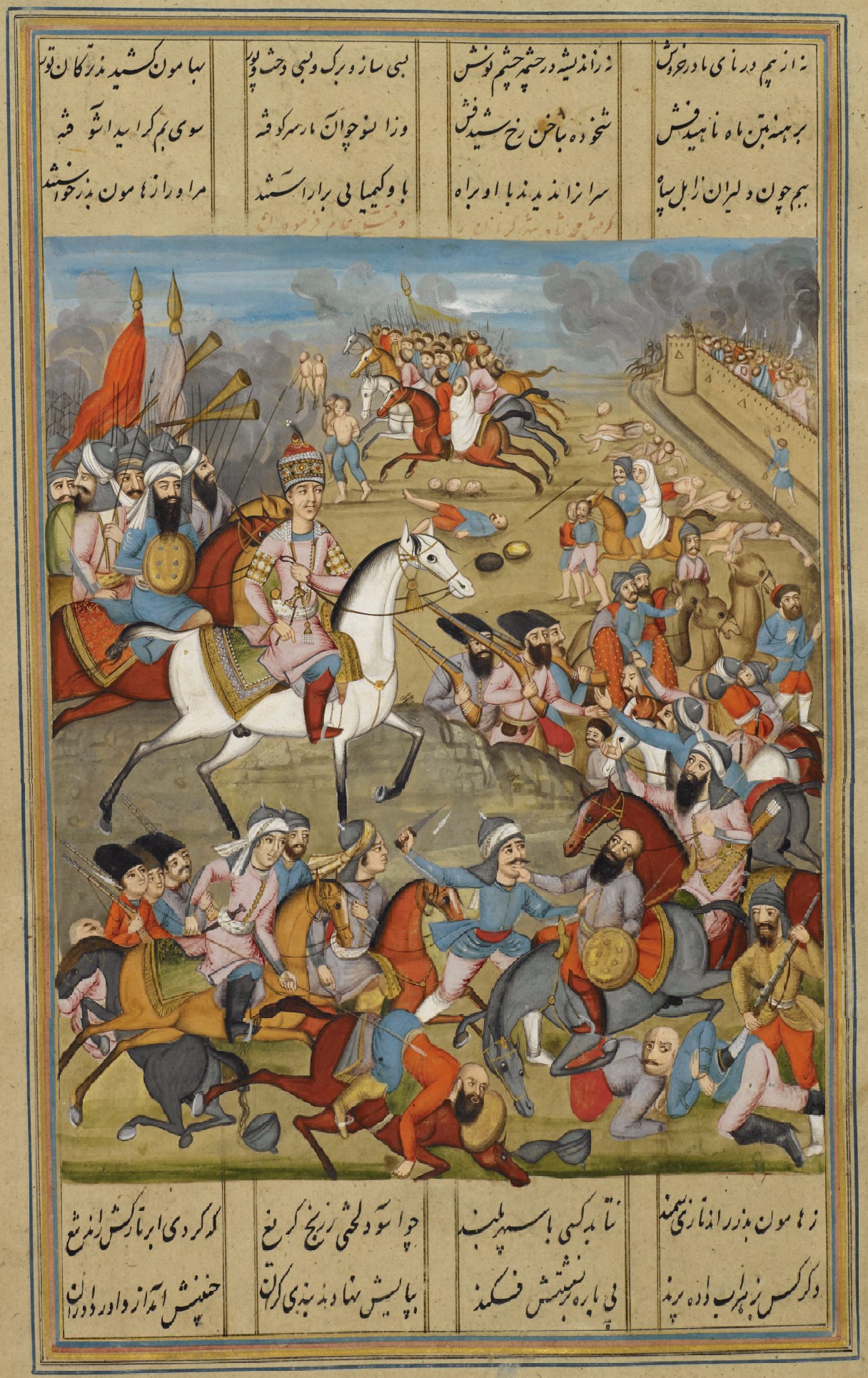
Capture and Sack of Kerman by Agha Mohammad Khan Qajar

=== Later conflicts and decline ===
The Zands would later be later involved in more battles against Lurs. In 1785, Ismail Khan Feyli, vali of Luristan, had submitted. In 1786, Jafar Khan Zand had "punished the Ja'iki Bakhteyari on their way back... to Behbehan" after having fought against Qajar forces that included a group of Qaragözlu, as well as against Banu Ka'b in Falahi and Mohammara. In 1797, the Mamasani attacked Mohammad Khan Zand, who was then captured by Feyli Lurs between Shushtar and Dezful in 1798. After the death of Karim Khan Zand, relations between the Zands and the Vali dynasty briefly improved, although their old enmity soon resurfaced, and Ismail Khan helped the Qajars in their rise to power. After the Qajars came to power, Ismail Khan attacked the Lak tribes, many of whom fled to Kermanshah.

The Lurs reportedly had little loyalty to the Qajars because they overthrew the Zands who originated in Luristan. The Vali dynasty, after the death of Ismail Khan, who supported Agha Mohammad Khan Qajar, was governed by his successor Hasan Khan, who maintained the alliance with the Qajars and even handed over Mohammad Khan Zand. However, the period of good relations between the Vali dynasty and the Qajars, which had largely been based on their shared enmity for the Zands, began to deteriorate, and the Qajars even captured Lorestan (Pish-e-Kuh), although the Vali dynasty did not cause problems afterwards and remained cooperative.

However, the Qajars would later decline, and lost control of all Lur territories by 1907, which came under the control of local tribes. In 1912, Salar-od-Dowleh, who was the brother of Mohammad Ali Shah Qajar, recruited Luri and Kurdish tribal warriors and attempted a revolution. Salar-od-Dowleh was defeated in Hamadan in May 1912, although his coup attempt had convinced Lurs and Kurds to continue rebelling against the Iranian government. The Luri and Kurdish regions were very unstable. When Reza Shah came to power, he led a successful campaign which brought all of the Lurs under direct state control.

The Kurds did not have conflicts with the Zands as they did with the Iranian dynasties before and after them, which had significantly contributed to the stability of Zand rule. The Zand period was generally considered one of the best time periods for Kurds, and they later became a symbol of Kurdish nationalism. However, nationalist sentiments were historically uncommon, especially in 18th-century Iran, and Karim Khan pursued tribal solidarity which outweighed any sense of nationalism.
