= Reza Qoli Khan Qajar =

18th-century Iranian prince and commander

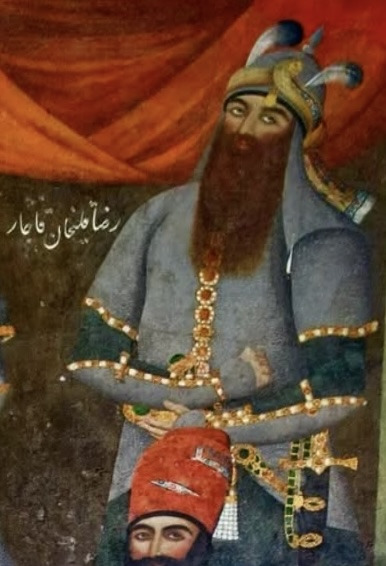
Reza Qoli Khan by Abdallah Khan featured in Soleymaniyeh Palace, Karaj.

Reza Qoli Khan Qajar (Persian: رضاقلی‌خان قاجار; born 1754 in Gorgan, Zand Iran; died between 1782 and 1796, probably at 1785 in Mashhad) was a son of Mohammad Hasan Khan Qajar and brother of Agha Mohammad Khan Qajar.

Mohammad Hassan Khan's eldest son, Agha Mohammad Khan, had escaped after his father's death, but was eventually captured and taken to captivity in Shiraz, where he was later joined by his full-brother, Hossein Qoli Khan, and where his paternal aunt, Khadija Begum, already a member of Karim Khan's harem, proved an invaluable support. Two other sons, Morteza Qoli Khan and Mostafa Qoli Khan, were allowed to remain in Astarabad, because their mother was the sister of Karim Khan's appointee as beglerbegi. Mohammad Hassan Khan's remaining sons, Reza Qoli, Jafar Qoli, Mahdi Qoli and Ali Qoli (Abbas Qoli died about this time).

== Sources ==
- Bamdad, Mehdi (1978). شرح حال رجال ایران در قرن ۱۲ و ۱۳ و ۱۴ هجری [Biographies of Iranian Elites in 17-20th Centuries] (in Persian). Zavvar.
- Hambly, Gavin R.G (1991). "Agha Muhammad Khan and the establishment of the Qajar dynasty". The Cambridge History of Iran, Vol. 7: From Nadir Shah to the Islamic Republic. Cambridge: Cambridge University Press. pp. 104–144. ISBN 9780521200950.
