= Siege of Shiraz (1758) =

1758 siege

- Part of Qajar-Zand Wars
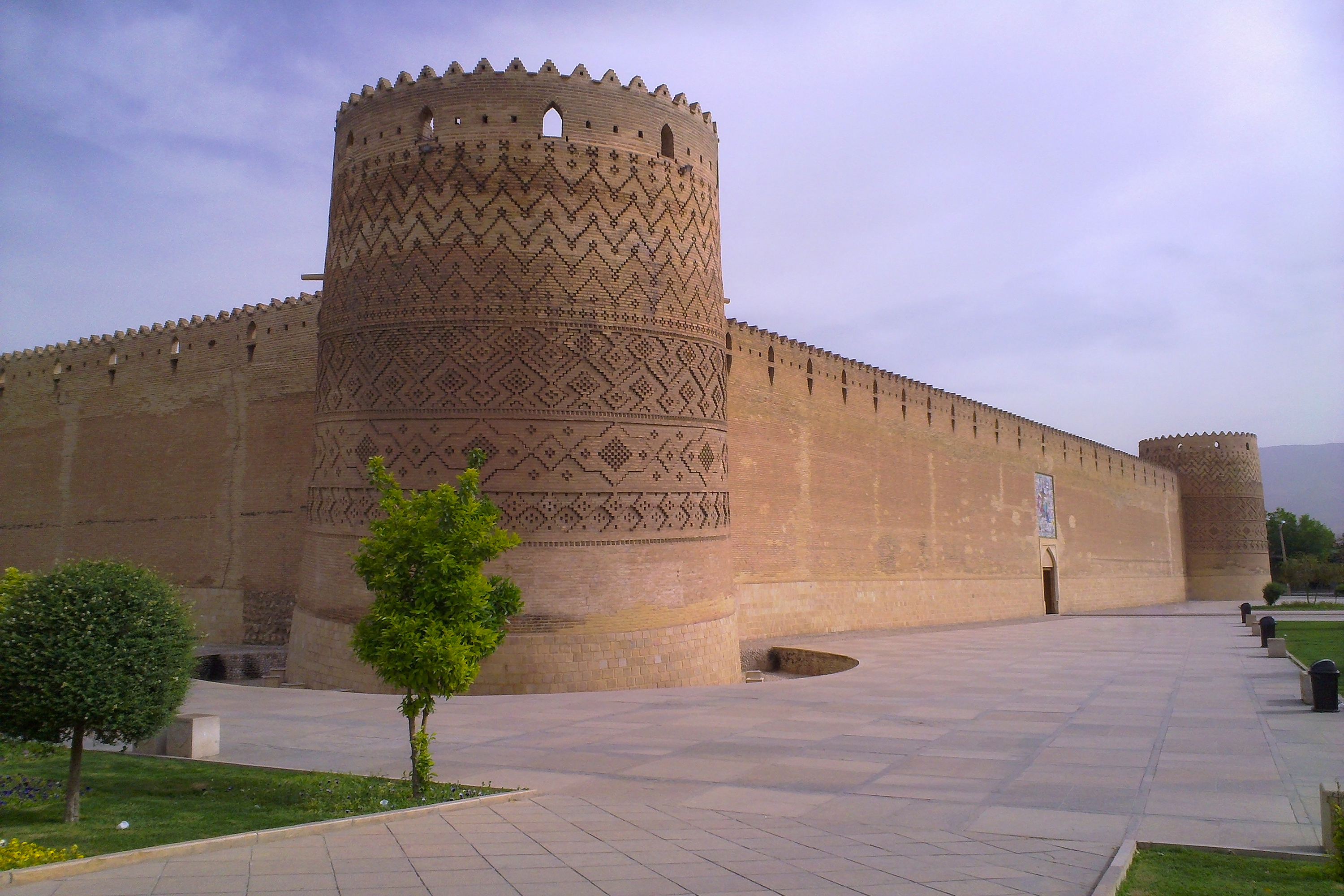
- The Arg of Karim Khan, a citadel erected by Karim Khan Zand, who defeated the Qajars.
| Date | 11 May 1758 - 4 July 1758 |
| Location | Shiraz, Iran 29.61°N 52.5425°E |
| Result | Zand victory: Qajar failure in capturing Shiraz |

Belligerents
| Zand Iran | Qajars; Supported by: Lar; Afshars of Urmia; Afghans; Uzbeks; Azeris |

Commanders and leaders
| Karim Khan Zand; Shaykh Ali Khan Zand; Nadr Khan Zand | Mohammad Hasan; Ebrahim Khan Boghayeri; Abu'l Qasem Khan (POW); Allies: Fath-Ali Khan Afshar; Nasir Khan Lari |

Strength
| 10,000: Rampart weaponry | At least 27,000 (Note: Based on figures from Mohammad Hasan's earlier scuffle with Azad): Siege weaponry; 12-13,000 horses and mules; 5,000 under Fath-Ali and Ebrahim Boghayeri; 300 under Abu'l Qasem |

Casualties and losses
| Negligible | Very heavy almost the entire force annihilated |

The Siege of Shiraz was a watershed siege engagement fought in 1758 between the Qajars of Mohammad Hasan Khan Qajar and Karim Khan Zand. It ended in a decisive victory for the Zands, who not only forced the Qajars to suspend the siege but conquered their lands afterwards.

== Background ==
In 1757, Mohammad Hasan Khan Qajar defeated Azad Khan Afghan at the Battle of Urmiya and occupied his capital, forcing the latter to flee to Baghdad. This allowed him to concentrate his resources on Karim Khan Zand, who mustered only about 10,000 poorly supplied troops in his capital in Shiraz by mid-January 1758. The Zands heavily re-fortified Shiraz and stocked it with ammunition and food in order to sustain a long siege, and went as far as devastating the countryside around Shiraz to diminish enemy supplies; the Qajars occupied most of Fars including Kazerun where Fath-Ali Khan Afshar and Ebrahim Khan Boghayeri's 5,000 men ousted Shaykh Ali Khan Zand, arrived, and defeated a detachment commanded by Nadr Khan Zand before beginning the siege on 11 May 1758.

== Siege ==
Mohammad Hasan Khan Qajar brought with him siege cannons from Kazerun, and received the support of Nasir Khan Lari who arrived the month after it began. However, they were outgunned by the superior Zand defenders and were subject to daily sorties from Shaykh Ali Khan Zand, Karim's cousin who drained their supplies and fostered dissent in the Qajar ranks, which was a fluid patchwork of multiple different ethnic groups, largely defectees from Azad Khan Afghan's ranks.

Shaykh 'Ali intercepted Abu'l Qasem Khan, the nasaqchi-bashi (Note: English = bodyguard) of Mohammad Hasan and defeated his band of 300, confiscating 12–13,000 mules who were sent 60 miles out of Shiraz to pasture, further diminishing Mohammad Hasan's offensive capability.

Eventually, some disaffected Uzbeks and Afghans plundered the Qajar camp at night on 3 July and dealt heavy damage to the Qajar ranks, leaving Shiraz. Mohammad Hasan decided to withdraw the next morning.

== Aftermath ==
The Qajars lost the majority of their forces as a result of the defeat; the endogenous force Mohammad Hasan had put together collapsed. The Qajars managed to retreat to Isfahan within 3 days but the garrison commander, Hoseyn Khan Develu, had made for Mazandaran with his troops, so Mohammad Hasan moved north to Astarabad via Kashan to secure his position there. Karim used the victory to cement his position in Fars before reconquering the rest of Iran, eventually defeating and killing Mohammad Hasan at the Battle of Astarabad in 1759.

== See also ==
- Zand Iran
- Mohammad Hasan Khan Qajar
- Karim Khan Zand
- Battle of Astarabad (1759)

== Sources ==
- Perry, John R. (1979). Karim Khan Zand: A History of Iran, 1747–1779. University of Chicago Press. ISBN 978-0-226-66098-1.
- Farrokh, Kaveh (2011). Iran at War: 1500-1988. Osprey Publishing. ISBN 978-1-84603-491-6.
