= Battle of Qara Chaman =

1762 battle

- Part of Zand campaigns in Kurdistan and Luristan
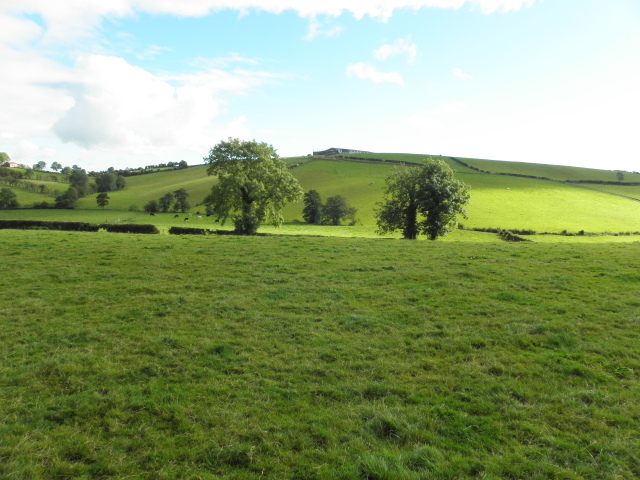
- The Mughan plain, north of the site of the battle.
Date	June/July 1762
Location	Qareh Chaman, Iran
Result	Zand victory: Karim Khan besieges Urmiya
Territorial changes	Azerbaijan up to Urmia conquered by the Zands

Belligerents
Zand Iran; Supported by: Kartvelian Gunners; Amarlu Kurds; Shamlu	Afshars of Urmia; Donboli Kurds; Karabakh Khanate

Commanders and leaders
Karim Khan Zand; Shaykh Ali Khan Zand; Esmail Khan Zand; Shaykh Morad Khan Zand; Kaka Khan Zand; Nadr Khan Zand (AWOL); Haydar Khan Zand; Lotf Ali Khan; Ebrahim Khan Boghayeri; Rafi' Khan Qajar	Fath-Ali Khan Afshar; Shahbaz Khan (POW); Amir Guna Khan Afshar; Najaf Qoli Khan 'Ali Morad Khan; Ebrahim Khan

Strength
Unknown: Large amounts of artillery	35,000: Large amounts of artillery

The Battle of Qara Chaman or Battle of Siah Chaman was an engagement fought between the forces of Karim Khan Zand and Fath 'Ali Khan Afshar. It ended in a major victory for the former who was able to impose his authority over Azerbaijan, and it was the chief event in the last of the campaigns of Karim Khan Zand.

== Background ==
After the Zand victory over the Qajars, Karim spent the next three years near the Shemiran pastures and Tehran. He conducted a brief reconnaissance mission in Azerbaijan in 1760 where he captured Maragha, but had to retreat due to rebellions by Kurdish and Shahsevani tribes. His goal in taking Azerbaijan was to dislodge Fath-Ali Khan Afshar, who was the right-hand man of Azad Khan Afghan, Karim's former rival, and refused to submit to the Zand fold. In 1762, Karim gathered a force and left Tehran to begin his second invasion of Azerbaijan, receiving support from the Shaqaqi Kurds and other Shahsevan tribes under 'Ali Khan.

== Formations ==
The battlefield was near Qara Chaman, 80 km/130m southeast of Tabriz. Karim arrayed his artillery, commanded by the Georgian gunner Lotf Ali Khan at the front flanked by musketeers, which was mirrored by Fath-Ali. On Karim's right was Shaykh Ali Khan with some officers, while Ebrahim Boghayeri and Rafi' Khan Qajar held the left. Behind the Zand line at a nearby ridge was the baggage train defended by Nadr Khan Zand.

Fath-Ali, whose army totalled 35,000 and was made up several different tribes of the Shahsevan, held his baggage train with 1,600 soldiers of Qarabagh. He commanded the center personally with his brothers 'Ali Morad Khan and Ebrahim Khan, while Najaf Qoli Khan and Amir Guna Khan Afshar led his left.

== Battle ==
The battle began with an artillery duel, followed by Fath-Ali's left charging the Zand right, which was routed. Shaykh Ali Khan escaped the onslaught with his troops and transferred to the Zand left. Amir Guna Khan Afshar led the Afshars ahead toward the Zand baggage train, plundering it while Nadr fled the field.

Mirroring the events on Shaykh Ali's flank, the Afshar right wing was routed by the Zand left, followed by the center when Shaykh Ali led a final charge with 300 Gholams that secured victory. Shahbaz Khan Donboli was found in the fighting; large amounts of Fath-Ali's men poured in the mountains and fled, but most of the chief commanders of his force managed to make it back toward Urmiya. (Note: Najaf Qoli Khan was captured and defected to the Zands during his pursuit.)

Fath-Ali's baggage train was overwhelmed shortly after the collision and many of the officers and soldiers captured during the battle were executed.

== Aftermath ==
The victory greatly lubricated Karim's expeditionary efforts in Azerbaijan, and while Fath-Ali managed to conserve a large part of his army; he briefly fled to Ottoman Iraq, but soon returned to Urmiya, where he subsequently surrendered.
