= Mohammad Hasan Khan Qajar =

Qajar chieftain (1715–1759)

Mohammad Hasan Khan Qajar محمدحسن‌خان قاجار
- Khan
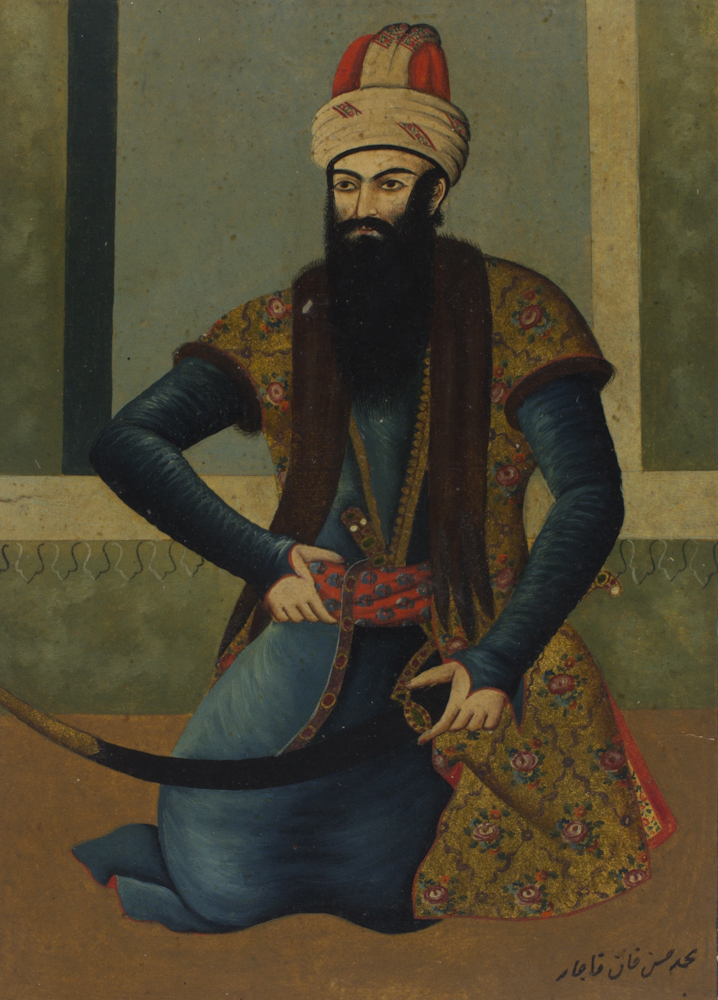

Khan of Gorgan, Mazandaran, and Gilan (before 1751 – 1759); Khan of Isfahan (1756 – 1759); Khan of Azerbaijan (1757 – 1759)
- Reign: 1751 – 13 February 1759
- Predecessor: Adel Shah Afshar; Karim Khan Zand
- Successor: Karim Khan Zand
- Born: 1715; Astarabad (now, Gorgan), Safavid Iran
- Died: 13 February 1759 (aged 43); Mazandaran, Zand Iran
- Spouses: Mrs. Qovanlu Qajar; Mrs. Devellu Qajar; Mrs. Ezzeddinlou Qajar; more
- Issue: Agha Mohammad Khan Qajar; Shah Jahan Bibi Khanum; Hossein Qoli Khan Qajar; Morteza Qoli Khan Qajar more
- Dynasty: Qajar
- Father: Fath-Ali Khan Qajar
- Military career
- Conflicts: List of Battles: Persian-Afghan Wars; Battle of Urmiya (1757); Qajar-Zand Wars; Siege of Astarabad; Battle of Kazzaz; Siege of Shiraz; Battle of Astarabad (1759) †

Mohammad Hasan Khan Qajar (Persian: محمدحسن‌خان قاجار), also spelled Muhammad Hassan (1715–1759), chief of the Qoyunlu branch of the Qajar tribe of Turkomans in the Caspian coastlands around Astarabad, was the son of Fath-Ali Khan Qajar and the father of Hossein Qoli Khan Qajar and Agha Mohammad Khan Qajar, who founded the Qajar dynasty of Iran. Mohammad Hasan Khan was an Iranian politician and military commander who fought several Iranian dynasties and tribes, including the Afsharids, Devellu Qajars, Zands, and Afghans, and captured and used the Safavid puppet king, Ismail III, to rule over all Iran. By 1757, he conquered several Iranian territories, such as Gorgan, Mazandaran, Gilan, Isfahan, Urmia, and Tabriz, and minted gold coins in his name in Isfahan and Tabriz. Due to the treachery of his own subjects and advantages of his rivals, Mohammad Hasan Khan lost all the conquered territories. Finally, he was killed in the battle of Astarabad in Mazandaran.

== Early life ==
In 1715, Mohammad Hasan Khan was born to Fath-Ali Khan Qovanlu Qajar in Astarabad (now, Gorgan), Iran. His father, Fath-Ali Khan, was the chief of the Qovanlu (Qoyunlu) branch of the Qajar tribe of the Turkomans who had been living near Astarabad in the coastlands of Caspian Sea for several centuries. His only brother, Mohammad Hosein Khan, died in childhood. In 1726, Mohammad Hasan Khan (age 11) lost his father. Following his father's death, he lived a nomadic life in the Gorgan Plain among the Yamut Turkmens for nearly 20 years, a period when Nader Shah Afshar was in power initially over parts of Safavid Iran and later over Afsharid Iran.

== Career ==
Mohammad Hasan Khan fought the Afsharids, Devellu Qajars, Zands, and Afghans to rule over all Iran.

In 1744, he attacked Astarabad against the Afsharids and Devellu Qajars led by Mohammad Zaman Khan, son of the governor Mohammad Hossein Khan Devellu Qajar who was appointed in that position by Nader Shah Afshar (r. 1736–1747). With a force of 3000 troops of Qajar, Yamut, and other tribes, Mohammad Hasan Khan conquered Astarabad with no fight due to the escape of Mohammad Zaman Khan. The hold on Astarabad, however, short-lived as Nader Shah ordered General Behbud Khan to take it back. Following a fight between the two sides, Mohammad Hasan Khan lost the battle to Behbud Khan and escaped to Qara Qum. In a joined operation in Astarabad, General Behbud Khan and Mohammad Hossein Khan Devellu massacred the Ashaqeh-bash Qajar tribe and other supporters. Subsequently, Mohammad Hasan Khan lost Astarabad.

In 1747, following the assassination of Nader Shah, once again Mohammad Hasan Khan, together with his Yamut allies led by Bekenj Khan and Goklen, attacked Astarabad. This time, the attack was neutralized by the new Afsharid king, Adel Shah (r. 1747–1748). Following this operation, Mohammad Hasan Khan's five-year-old son and the future shah of Qajar Iran, Agha Mohammad Khan, was captured in Astarabad, brought to the Afsharid capital city of Mashhad, and turned into a eunuch. Adel Shah, seemingly, initially thought of killing the boy, but proceeded with his castration instead.

In 1748, following the death of Adel Shah, Mohammad Hasan Khan planned expanding his territory. By 1751, he was in power over Gorgan, Mazandaran, and Gilan.

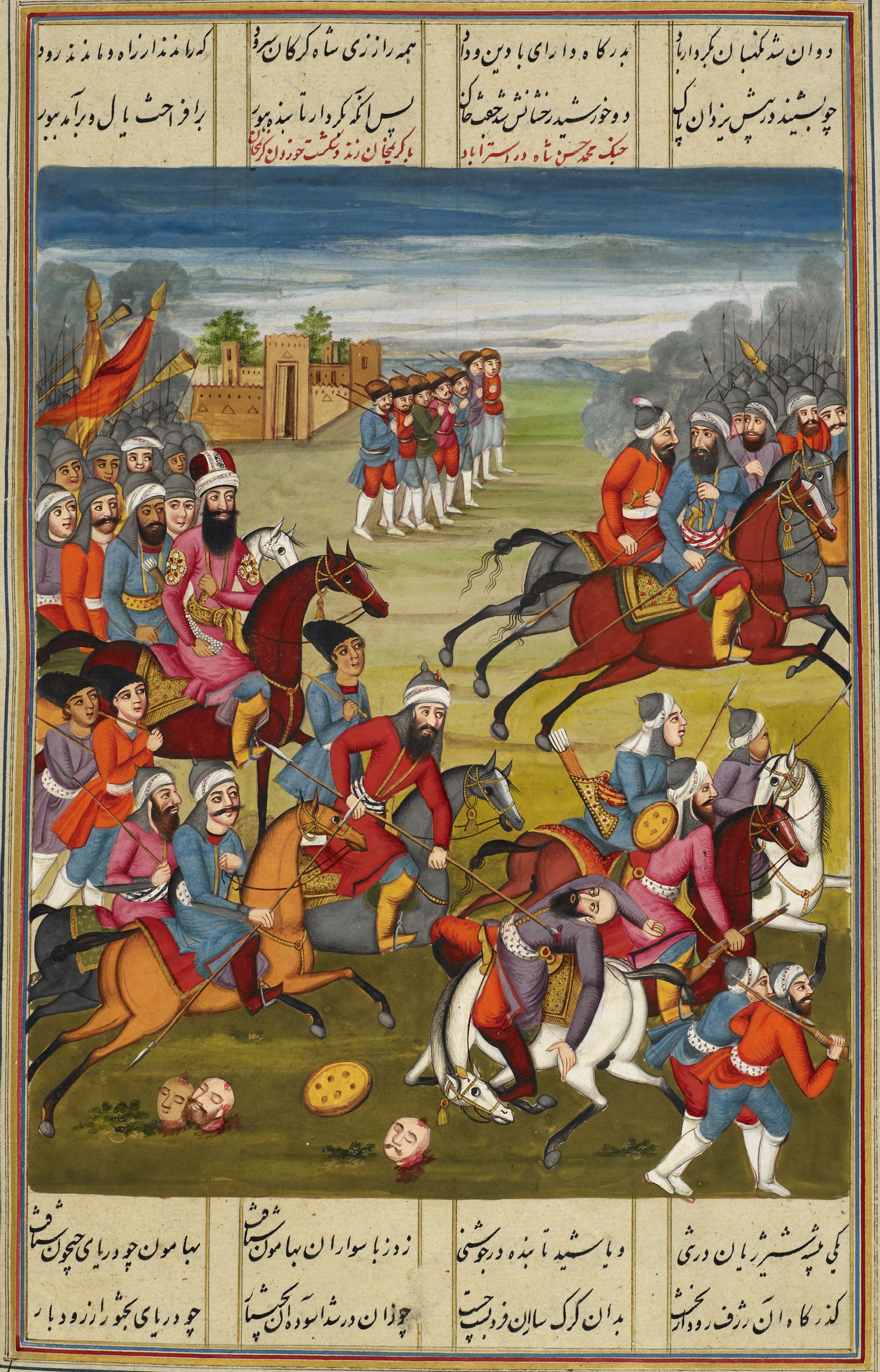
Defeat of Karim Khan Zand by Mohammad Hasan Khan Qajar at Astarabad. Folio from the Shahanshahnameh of Fath 'Ali Khan Saba, dated 1810

In 1751, Mohammad Hasan Khan planned an attack on Karim Khan Zand (r. 1751–1779) who besieged Kermanshah. While on the way toward Kermanshah, Mohammad Hasan Khan received the news of Karim Khan's success in seizing Kermanshah. Then, he retreated to Astarabad, while being followed by Karim Khan all the way to the city. Astarabad was subsequently surrounded by the Karim Khan's forces. To counter the siege of Astarabad, Mohammad Hasan Khan, with the help of the Yamut allies, ambushed the Zand forces, forced them to move to Tehran, and captured the Safavid puppet king, Ismail III. Back in Mazandaran and Gilan, Mohammad Hasan Khan restored order after the local rulers left their positions once they saw his chance of holding on to power in decline.

In 1755, Mohammad Hasan Khan fought and defeated a regiment of the Abdali Afghans near Sabzevar.

In 1756, Mohammad Hasan Khan defeated a small Zand force at the Battle of Kazzaz and fought Karim Khan's forces at Gulnabad, defeated them, and captured the city of Isfahan, where he minted gold coins in his name.

In 1757, he marched toward Urmia, which was Azerbaijan's capital and ruled by Azad Khan Afghan, who had launched an unsuccessful attack on Mohammad Hasan Khan's base in Gilan. He forced Azad Khan to escape to the Ottoman empire and captured Tabriz and Urmia without a fight. According to Adib-ol-Shoara, Mohammad Hasan Khan was welcomed by the inhabitants of Tabriz. There, he minted gold coins in his name and installed Agha Mohammad Khan as his deputy.

In 1758, Mohammad Hasan Khan besieged the stronghold of Karim Khan, the city of Shiraz, to force the Zand ruler to surrender and finally end the Zand rule over Iran. However, due to lack of food and supply outside the city, the situation gradually turned against him. Meanwhile, Karim Khan remained securely inside the city fortifications and did not surrender. Subsequently, in July 1758, Mohammad Hasan Khan moved back to Mazandaran, while Karim Khan's general, Sheikh Ali Khan Zand, followed him all the way. The final blow came from the disobedience of his subordinates, in particular, Mohammad Hossein Khan Devellu Qajar, which resulted in his defeat at the Battle of Astarabad. On 13 February 1759, while escaping to seek refuge in Astarabad, Mohammad Hasan Khan was killed by Mohammad Khan Savadkuh in Mazandaran.

== Reign ==
Etemad-os-Saltaneh, the 19th-century scholar, listed Mohammad Hasan Khan as Mohammad Hasan Shah and the Qajar's first Shah, who reigned for eight years from 1751 to 1759.

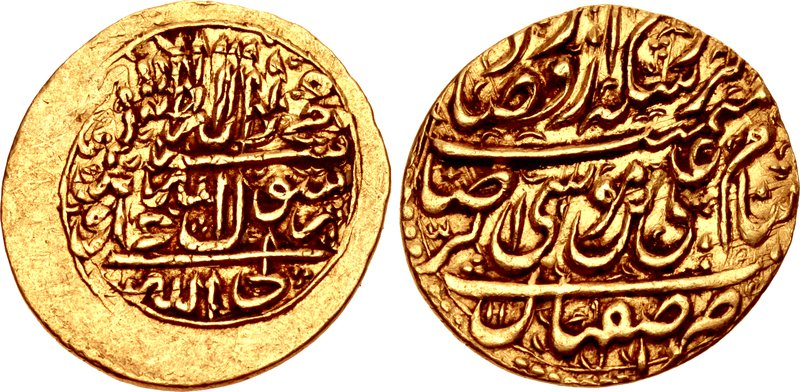
Coin minted in Isfahan during the reign of Mohammad Hasan Khan Qajar, dated 1755/6

Hambly, the 20th-century professor of history, states that Mohammad Hasan Khan established the Qajar rule by 1751 in Gorgan, Mazandaran, and Gilan, expanded his rule to Isfahan by 1756 and to Azerbaijan by 1757, and ruled as a sovereign until death in 1759, when the Qajar sovereignty over these territories were paused. The pause lasted until his deputy and son Agha Mohammad Khan began re-establishing the Qajar rule in 1779.

== Death ==
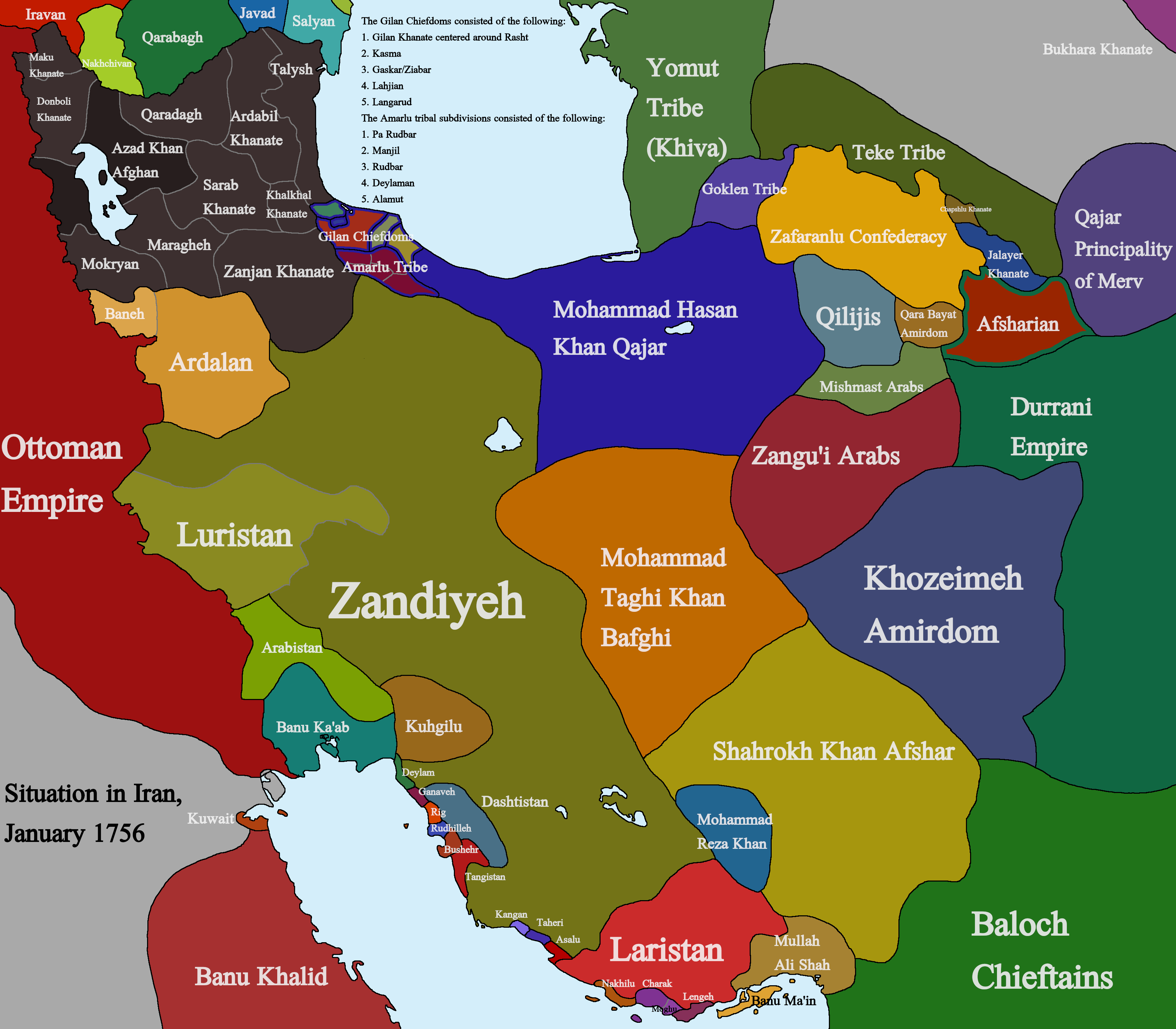
Map of Iran just before Mohammad Hasan Khan Qajar's campaign in Central Iran

After an expedition to ensure the obedience of the khanates of the Caucasus, Mohammad Hasan Khan turned to face Karim Khan Zand; after some successes, penetrating as far south as Shiraz, Karim Khan's most dangerous rival was defeated and killed in the battle of Astarabad in Mazandaran on 13 February 1759.

== Legacy ==
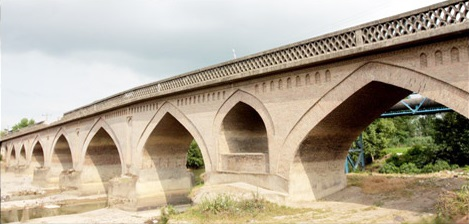
Mohammad Hassan Khan Bridge in Babol, Iran

Mohammad Hasan Khan held his court at Ashraf (now, Behshahr) in Mazandaran and repaired the Safavid palace. Moreover, he directed numerous public construction projects, for instance, Mohammad Hassan Khan Bridge over the Babol river in Mazandaran, and a mosque at Barforush (now, Babol). As a claim to sovereignty, he minted gold coins in Isfahan and Tabriz in his name. Above all, he set an example of the Qajar rule over Iranian territories for his son Agha Mohammad Khan Qajar, who eventually fulfilled the father's ambition to bring all Iran under the Qajar rule.

== Marriage and children ==
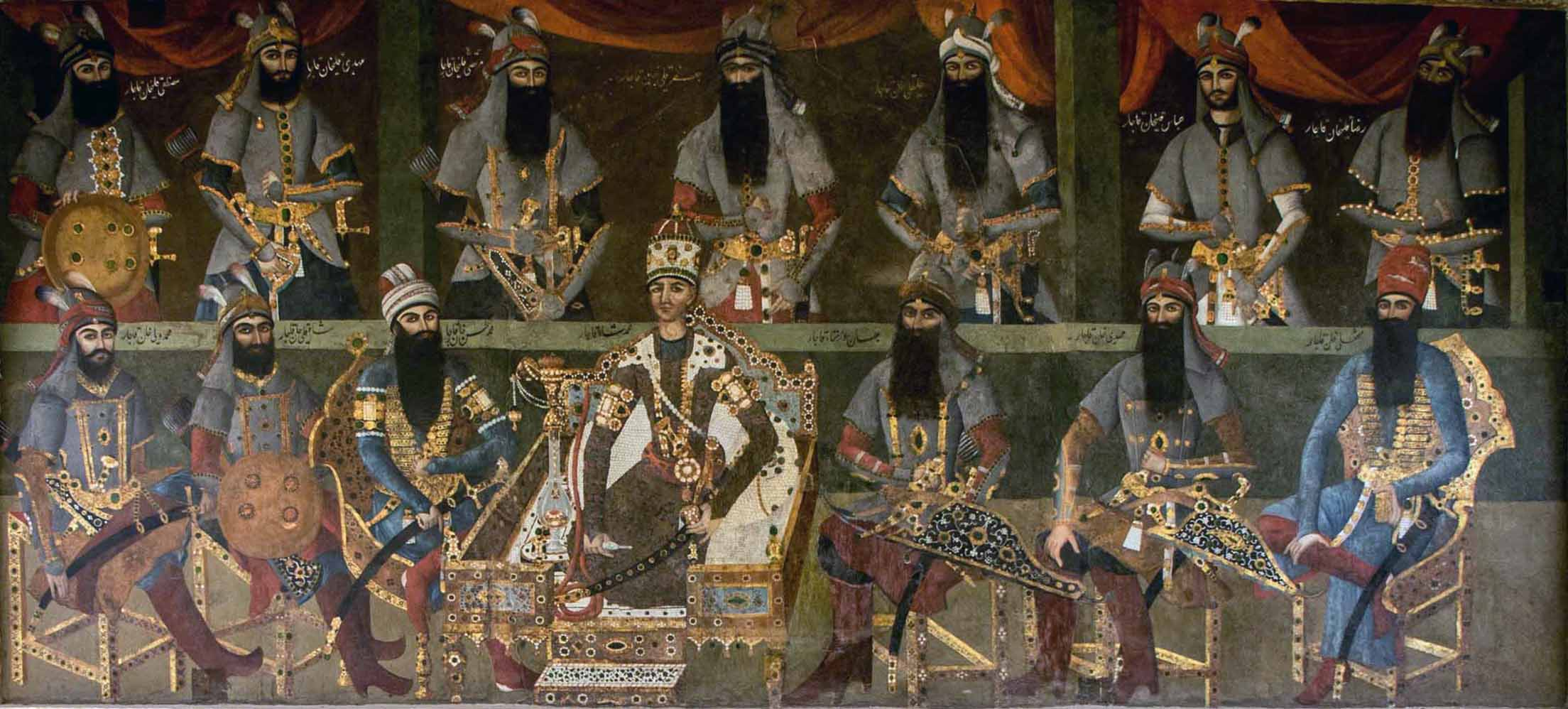
Agha Mohammad Khan Qajar and Family members

Mohammad Hasan Khan married multiple times and had nine sons and two daughters. From his marriage to the daughter of Eskandar Khan Qovanlu Qajar, he had two sons: Agha Mohammad Khan and Hossein Qoli Khan. From another marriage, he had two sons: Morteza Qoli Khan and Mosfata Qoli Khan. From marriage to a lady from the Ezzeddinlou Qajar family of the Ashaqeh-Bash tribe, he had Jafar Qoli Khan. From other marriages, he had four other sons: Reza Qoli Khan, Mahdi Qoli Khan, Ali Qoli Khan, and Abbas Qoli Khan. His son Abbas Qoli Khan died in childhood.

=== Children ===
Here, a non-exhaustive list of Mohammad Hasan Khan's children is arranged in an interactive sortable table. The table's denotations are:

- S: Son
- D: Daughter

Children
No.	S/D	Name	Birth	Death	Mother	Spouse(s)	Notes	Reference(s)
1	S	Agha Mohammad Khan	1742; Gorgan	1797; Shusha	Mrs. Qovanlu Qajar		His mother was the daughter of Eskandar Khan Qovanlu Qajar.	
2	D	Shah Jahan Bibi Khanum	c. 1745; Gorgan		Mrs. Qovanlu Qajar	Ali-Morad Khan Zand	born after 1743; full-sister of Agha Mohammad Khan; After 1759, Karim Khan Zand brought her from Qazvin to Shiraz to marry her to his son Mohammad Rahim Khan. However, Karim Khan's daughter disapproved her for the marriage. Thus, she was sent back to Qazvin. After 1781, she married Ali-Morad Khan, the Zand ruler, and settled in Khanlar Khan.	
3	S	Hossein Qoli Khan	1751; Gorgan	1777; Fenderesk	Mrs. Qovanlu Qajar	Asiye Khanum Ezzeddin Qajar (Mahd-e Olya)	full-brother of Agha Mohammad Khan	
4	S	Morteza Qoli Khan	c. 1751; Gorgan	1800; Astrakhan	Mrs. Devellu Qajar		His mother was a sister of Mohammad Hossein Khan Devellu Qajar, the governor of Gorgan and Mazandaran.	
5	S	Jafar Qoli Khan	1752; Gorgan	1791; Tehran	Mrs. Ezzeddinlou Qajar	• Nabat Khanum • Zohreh	His mother was from the Ashaqeh-Bash tribe.	
6	S	Mostafa Qoli Khan	c. 1753; Gorgan	c. 1798; Tehran	Mrs. Devellu Qajar	Mina	full-brother of Morteza Qoli Khan; died after 1797	
7	S	Reza Qoli Khan	c. 1754; Gorgan	c. 1785; Mashhad	a woman from Gorgan		He died between 1782 and 1796 while he was at Shahrokh Shah's residence.	
8	S	Mahdi Qoli Khan	c. 1754; Gorgan	1784; Gorgan	a Kurdish woman from Gorgan	Asiya Khanum Devellu	He was the father of Ebrahim Khan Zahir-od-Dowleh. After his death, Asiya Khanum married Fath-Ali Shah Qajar.	
9	S	Ali Qoli Khan	1756; Gorgan	1824; Babol	a woman from Isfahan			
10	S	Abbas Qoli Khan	c. 1757; Gorgan	c. 1759; Gorgan	a Kurdish woman from Gorgan		full-brother of Mahdi Qoli Khan	
11	D	Zobeideh Khaleh	c. 1757; Gorgan			son of Ali-Morad Khan Zand	born in or before 1757; died childless in her youth	

== Sources ==
- Azodi, Ahmad Mirza Azdo-Dowleh (1887). تاریخ عضدی [Azodi History] (in Persian). Maharat.
- Bamdad, Mehdi (1978). شرح حال رجال ایران در قرن ۱۲ و ۱۳ و ۱۴ هجری [Biographies of Iranian Elites in 17-20th Centuries] (in Persian). Zavvar.
- Bosworth, Clifford Edmund (1996). The new Islamic dynasties: a chronological and genealogical manual. New York: Columbia University Press. ISBN 0231107145.
- Etemad-os-Saltaneh, Mohammad Hasan Khan (1881). Tarikh-e Montazam-e Naseri (تاریخ منتظم ناصری) [Naseri Orderly History] (PDF) (in Persian). Tehran: Hand-written.
- Farrokh, Kaveh (2011). Iran at War: 1500–1988 (PDF). Oxford: Osprey Publishing. ISBN 978-1-84603-491-6.
- Hambly, Gavin R.G (1991). "Agha Muhammad Khan and the establishment of the Qajar dynasty". The Cambridge History of Iran, Vol. 7: From Nadir Shah to the Islamic Republic. Cambridge: Cambridge University Press. pp. 104–144. ISBN 9780521200950.
- Khavari, Mirza Fazlollah Shirazi (1845). Tarikh Zol Qarnein (تاریخ ذوالقرنین) (in Persian). Ministry of Culture and Islamic Guidance of Iran.
- Perry, J. R. (1984). "Āḡā Moḥammad Khan Qājār". Encyclopaedia Iranica, Vol. I, Fasc. 6. pp. 602–605.
- Perry, J. R. (1979). Karim Khan Zand. Oxford: Oneworld.
- Sepehr, Mohammad Taqi Lesanolmolk (1855). ناسخ التواریخ تاریخ قاجاریه [Qajar History] (in Persian). Asatir.
- Tapper, Richard (1997). Frontier Nomads of Iran: A Political and Social History of the Shahsevan. Cambridge University Press. ISBN 0-521-58336-5.
- Werner, Christoph (2000). An Iranian Town in Transition: A Social and Economic History of the Elites of Tabriz, 1747-1848. Otto Harrassowitz. ISBN 3-447-04309-1.
