= Battle of Kazzaz =

1756 battle

- Part of Qajar-Zand Wars
| Date | 27 March 1756 |
| Location | Kazzaz, Iran |
| Result | Qajar victory |

Belligerents
| Zand Iran | Qajars |

Commanders and leaders
| Shaykh Ali Khan Zand; Mohammad Khan Zand (POW) | Mohammad Hasan Khan Qajar |

Strength
| Smaller | Larger |

The Battle of Kazzaz was an engagement fought between the forces of Mohammad Hasan Khan Qajar, and the two Zand commanders Shaykh Ali Khan Zand and Mohammad Khan Zand. It ended in a crucial victory for the Qajars that allowed them to advance toward Isfahan, and unsuccessfully besiege the Zand capital of Shiraz.

== Background ==
After the expulsion of Azad Khan Afghan from both Shiraz and Isfahan at the hands of Karim Khan Zand, who defeated him at the Battle of Kamarej, Zand forces dispersed or went home, and mutinies took place in their ranks, particularly among disgruntled Arab musketeers who were kept in the encampments against their will with subpar pay. Karim knew an incursion by the burgeoning Mohammad Hasan Khan Qajar, who ruled the lands of Mazandaran, Gilan and Gorgan was imminent. He sent an ultimatum to Karim, offering to invest him as beglerbegi of Fars if he supported him in his campaigns in Iran. Karim adamantly rebuffed this, prompting Mohammad Hasan to march south toward Kashan. A Zand force led by Shaykh Ali Khan Zand and Mohammad Khan Zand materialized nearby and confronted them.

== Battle ==
The engagement took place on 27 March, 1756 northwest of Isfahan at the Sanjan region near Kazzaz. The Zands were heavily outnumbered and this caused their subsequent defeat by the seasoned and superior Qajar force, which was accompanied by musketeers levied in Astarabad. Mohammad Khan Zand was taken captive during the battle when his horse was shot under him; 4 of his officers were taken too. Shaykh Ali Khan escaped the catastrophe with 15 men and made it back to Isfahan.

== Aftermath ==
The defeat was a catastrophic blow that reversed the Zand reconquest efforts, and Karim was forced to flee Isfahan for Shiraz where he was cornered and unsuccessfully besieged by the Qajars. He later managed to return the defeat at Kazzaz to become the pre-eminent ruler in Iran. (Note: Mohammad Khan Zand later attempted to escape captivity after the failed Qajar siege of Shiraz, but was apprehended and executed in 1758.)
