= Siege of Astarabad =

Siege and Battle of Astarabad
- Part of Qajar-Zand Wars
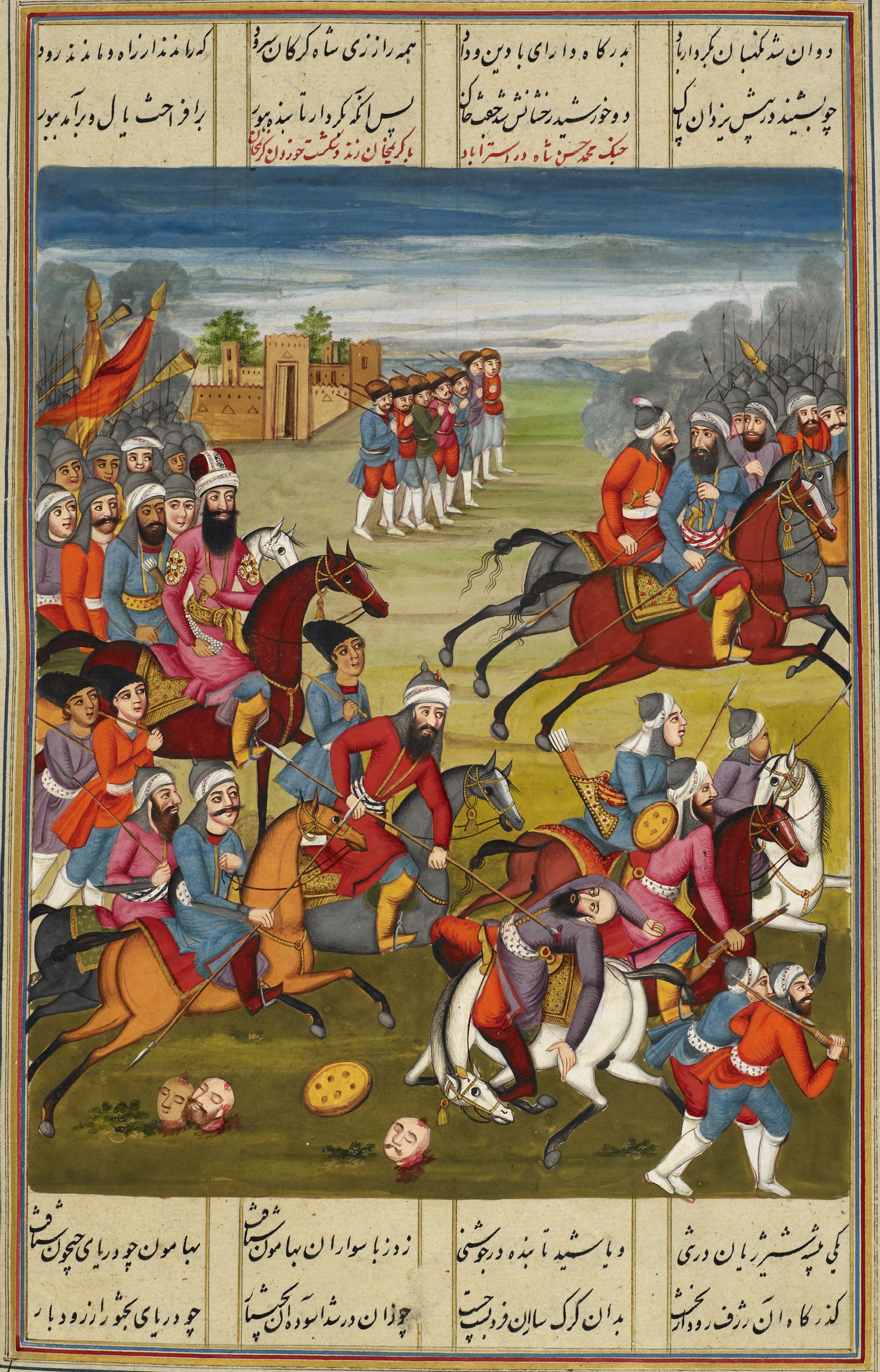
- Defeat of Karim Khan Zand by Mohammad Hasan Shah at Astarabad, folio from the Shahinshahnama of Fath 'Ali Khan Saba, dated 1810
| Date | Summer-Winter 1752 |
| Location | Astarabad, Golestan province 36.846667°N 54.43°E |
| Result | Qajar victory |

Belligerents
| Zand Iran | Qajars |

Commanders and leaders
| Karim Khan Zand; Ismail III (POW); Musa Khan Afshar; Zakariya Khan | Mohammad Hasan Khan |

Strength
| 45,000: Siege artillery | 35,000 |

Casualties and losses
| 12,000 killed 15,000 captured | Unknown |

The Siege and Battle of Astarabad was an engagement fought in the latter half of 1752 between the forces of Karim Khan Zand and Mohammad Hasan Khan Qajar. It resulted in a major Qajar victory that nearly drove the Zands to collapse.

== Background ==
Shortly after his victory over Ali Mardan Khan at Nahavand, Karim began to besiege Kermanshah, but Mohammad Hasan Khan Qajar of the Quwanlu Ashaghabash began marching to the city's relief with contingents of Qajars, Yomut Turkmen and some firearm users; he was poised to control Iran and had taken Gilan, Mazandaran, Astarabad, and held influence over Tehran and the surrounding areas. Karim marched out to meet him and defeated the Qajars in Late Summer 1752, so they began retreating all the way to their base in Astarabad; Karim followed him with a larger force despite campaign season leaving, believing it expedient to rule out a potential threat to his sovereignty.

== Battle ==
Karim built four trenches around the city including some earthworks; Mohammad Hasan initially refused talks but when Karim deployed siege weapons offered to pay him off, send 300 hostages including his son Mohammad Khan and a hundred thoroughbreds but this was declined, so he resorted to sorties and falling upon Zand foragers, warning Karim that if he did not turn back he would be defeated.

After this material loss, winter began and the Qajars concealed some cavalry on a flank, formed up and after some initial skirmishes allowed the Zands to charge, falling into a subsequent ambush that saw their complete rout beyond the trenches. The baggage train and supply line was plundered by some of the Qajars, but an officer named Musa Khan Afshar fought them off in a rearguard action. Shah Isma'il was captured but Karim escaped to Tehran due to Mohammad Hasan not pursuing him despite the Zands losing more than half of their army as either casualties or captives. Zakariya Khan of Borujerd had accompanied Karim in the siege and persuaded Isma'il to surrender after he turncoated to the Qajars.

== Aftermath ==
Karim was subject to a major humiliation after this defeat and upon his retreat to Tehran had seen 12,000 of his men killed and 16,000 captured at the hands of the Qajars. He was left unable to respond when Azad Khan Afghan invaded Zand territories and pushed as far south as Fars. However, after the latter's death, Karim regained his footing and his general later subjected Mohammad Hasan Khan Qajar to a decisive defeat in 1759.
