= Fath-Ali Khan Afshar =

Khan of Urmia until 1764

- Died: 24 July, 1764 Mizdej, Chaharmahal and Bakhtiari
- Cause of death: Execution
- Buried: Shrine of Shah Reza, Qomeshah
- Allegiance: Afshars of Urmia; Azad's army Qajars; Zand dynasty
- Children: Rashid Beg; Jahangir Khan

Fath-Ali Khan Afshar (Persian: فتحعلی خان افشار), was a chieftain from the Afshar tribe of Urmia, and one of the four contenders for supremacy in Iran between 1751–1763. He was ultimately defeated and captured in February 1763 by one of the contenders, the Zand ruler Karim Khan Zand (r. 1751–1779). The latter had Fath-Ali Khan executed the following year, in July 1764.

== Background ==
Fath-Ali Khan belonged to the Arashlu subgroup of the Afshar tribe. He was from the branch of Afshars that had populated the city of Urmia since the Safavid era. According to the modern historian P. Oberling, Fath-Ali Khan was "the most famous of the Afshar governors of Urmia." The Urmia Afshars played a big role in the violent wars that followed after the death of the shah (king) of Iran, Nader Shah (r. 1736–1747) in 1747.

== Biography ==
Through extensive local support, Fath-Ali Khan was able to control all of the Azerbaijan province by 1749. Fath-Ali Khan was a deputy and general of Azad Khan Afghan (died 1781), a Ghilzai Pashtun from Kabul who had risen to a somewhat powerful position in Azerbaijan, and had his base at Urmia. Fath-Ali Khan, Azad Khan Afghan, the Zand ruler Karim Khan Zand (r. 1751–1779) and the Qajar chieftain Mohammad Hasan Khan Qajar were the four contenders for supremacy in Iran.

In the summer of 1753, Azad Khan routed an army of Karim Khan. Azad Khan capitalized on his success by marching towards the Zand fortress of Pari, where Karim Khan's cousin Shaykh Ali Khan Zand (died 1779) had fled to. There he tricked the Shaykh Ali Khan and Mohammad Khan Zand to go out, which led to their capture along with fifteen other relatives. In October, Azad Khan captured Isfahan and its surroundings. Meanwhile, Fath-Ali Khan had the town of Qumishah devastated. Soon afterwards, Karim Khan, along with some reinforcements, went to Qumishah, from which they made guerilla attacks against Azad Khan's raiders and communications. Fath-Ali Khan led an attack into the town, which resulted in the death of Karim Khan's half-brother Eskandar Khan Zand and the withdrawal of the Zand forces. However, Zand morale soon rose, following the escape of the prisoners captured by Azad at Pari.

In 1754, Azad Khan sent a re-equipped force under Fath-Ali Khan to attack the newly raised Zand army, which had heavily disintegrated due to the harsh winter. The core unit of the Zands put a fierce resistance to give the women and baggage time to escape. It was during this event that Mohammad Khan split from others, and made a series of accomplishments, including the murder of Bakhtiyari chieftain Ali Mardan Khan Bakhtiari. With the help of Haydar Khan Zanganeh, he eliminated Azad Khan's influence in Persian Iraq. Meanwhile, Azad Khan had entered Shiraz in August 1754, and the following month, Karim Khan's small force at Kazerun was repelled by Fath-Ali Khan.

However, Fath-Ali Khan and his Afshar troops were soon ambushed at the narrow Kamarej pass by a combined force of Zand, Dashtestani and Khesht musketeers. This resulted in the defeat and flight of the Afshar forces. The survivors fled to Shiraz, which Azad Khan was forced to abandon ten days later. On 29 November 1754, Karim Khan arrived to Shiraz. During the next spring, Fath-Ali Khan was defeated by Mohammad Khan, who had reunited with Karim Khan. Azad Khan soon clashed with Mohammad Hasan Khan Qajar, who was re-establishing his control over Mazandaran and Gilan. In August 1756, Azad Khan chased after a retreating Qajar force to the coast of the Caspian Sea. During the winter, he was defeated by a Qajar surprise, which led to his withdrawal to Azerbaijan. Tabriz soon fell to the Qajars, and Urmia surrendered in June 1757. Azad Khan fled to Baghdad, while Fath-Ali Khan was persuaded to join the Qajars.

In the spring of 1760, Karim Khan launched an aggressive campaign into Azerbaijan. He briefly occupied Maragheh, but his soldiers were too lightly-equipped to capture Tabriz, which was well protected by Fath-Ali Khan. Karim Khan thus went back to Tehran before the season changed. In the summer of 1760, Azad Khan attempted to reassert his authority in Azerbaijan, but he was defeated by his former allies, including Fath-Ali Khan. In the spring or summer of 1761, Fath-Ali Khan besieged Shusha in Karabakh. Its ruler, Panah Ali Khan made him lift the siege by giving his son Ibrahim Khalil Khan as hostage.

In the summer of 1762, Karim Khan marched another expedition into Azerbaijan, where he defeated Fath-Ali Khan at the Battle of Qara Chaman, who fled to Urmia. A few weeks later, Karim Khan besieged Urmia, which eventually fell in February 1763. This marked the downfall of Fath-Ali Khan's confederation. Karim Khan now controlled all of Iran, with the exception of Afsharid-ruled Khorasan. Karim Khan later had Fath-Ali Khan executed, in July 1764 near Isfahan. This may have been done due to Fath-Ali Khan's history of oppression and betrayal.

== Sources ==
- Kondo, Nobuaki (1999). "Qizilbash Afterwards: The Afshars in Urmiya from the Seventeenth to the Nineteenth Century". Iranian Studies. 32 (4): 537–556. doi:10.1080/00210869908701968. JSTOR 4310267. (registration required)
- Oberling, P. (1984). "Afšār". In Yarshater, Ehsan (ed.). Encyclopædia Iranica. Vol. I/6: Afghanistan–Ahriman. London and New York: Routledge & Kegan Paul. pp. 582–586. ISBN 978-0-71009-095-9.
- Perry, John R. (1979). Karim Khan Zand: A History of Iran, 1747-1779. University of Chicago Press. ISBN 978-0226660981.
- Perry, John. R. (1987). "Āzād Khan Afḡān". In Yarshater, Ehsan (ed.). Encyclopædia Iranica. Vol. III/2: Awāʾel al-maqālāt–Azerbaijan IV. London and New York: Routledge & Kegan Paul. pp. 173–174. ISBN 978-0-71009-114-7.
- Perry, John. R. (1991). "The Zand dynasty". In Avery, Peter; Hambly, Gavin R. G.; Melville, Charles Peter (eds.). The Cambridge History of Iran: From Nadir Shah to the Islamic Republic. Vol. 7. Cambridge: Cambridge University Press. pp. 63–104. ISBN 0-521-20095-4.
- Perry, John R. (2011). "Karim Khan Zand". In Yarshater, Ehsan (ed.). Encyclopædia Iranica. Vol. XV/6: Karim Khan Zand–Kašḡari, Saʿd-al-Din. London and New York: Routledge & Kegan Paul. pp. 561–564. ISBN 978-1-934283-29-5.
- Tapper, Richard (1997). Frontier Nomads of Iran: A Political and Social History of the Shahsevan. Cambridge University Press. ISBN 978-0-52158-336-7.
