= Ali-Qoli Khan Qajar =

19th-century governor in Iran

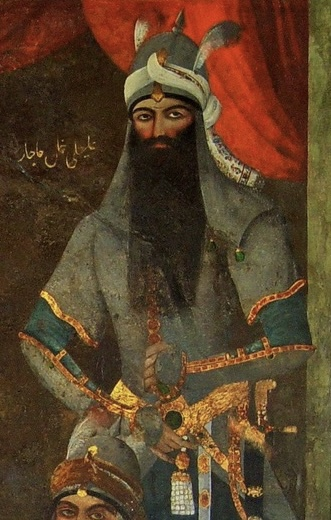
- Ali Qoli Khan by Abdallah Khan featured in Soleymaniyeh Palace, Karaj.

Governor of Isfahan
- Predecessor: Jafar-Qoli Khan Qajar
- Successor: Unknown
- Born: c. 1756; Astarabad (now Gorgan)
- Died: 1824 (aged 67–68); Barforush (now Babol)
- House: Qajar
- Father: Mohammad Hasan Khan Qajar
- Mother: Unnamed non-Qajar woman

Ali-Qoli Khan Qajar (Persian: علی‌قلی‌خان قاجار; c. 1756–1824) was a son of Mohammad Hasan Khan Qajar (d. 1759) and half-brother of Agha Mohammad Khan Qajar (r. 1789–1797), the founder of the Qajar dynasty of Iran. Unlike Agha Mohammad Khan's full brothers, Ali-Qoli Khan served loyally from the outset and supported, for around twenty years (with brief intervals), Agha Mohammad Khan's conquest for control over all of Iran. Following Agha Mohammad Khan's assassination in 1797, he unsuccessfully tried to claim himself as his brother's rightful successor. Ali-Qoli Khan was eventually blinded and exiled by his nephew Baba Khan, who would ascend the Iranian throne as Fath-Ali Shah Qajar (r. 1797–1834).

== Biography ==
=== Early life ===
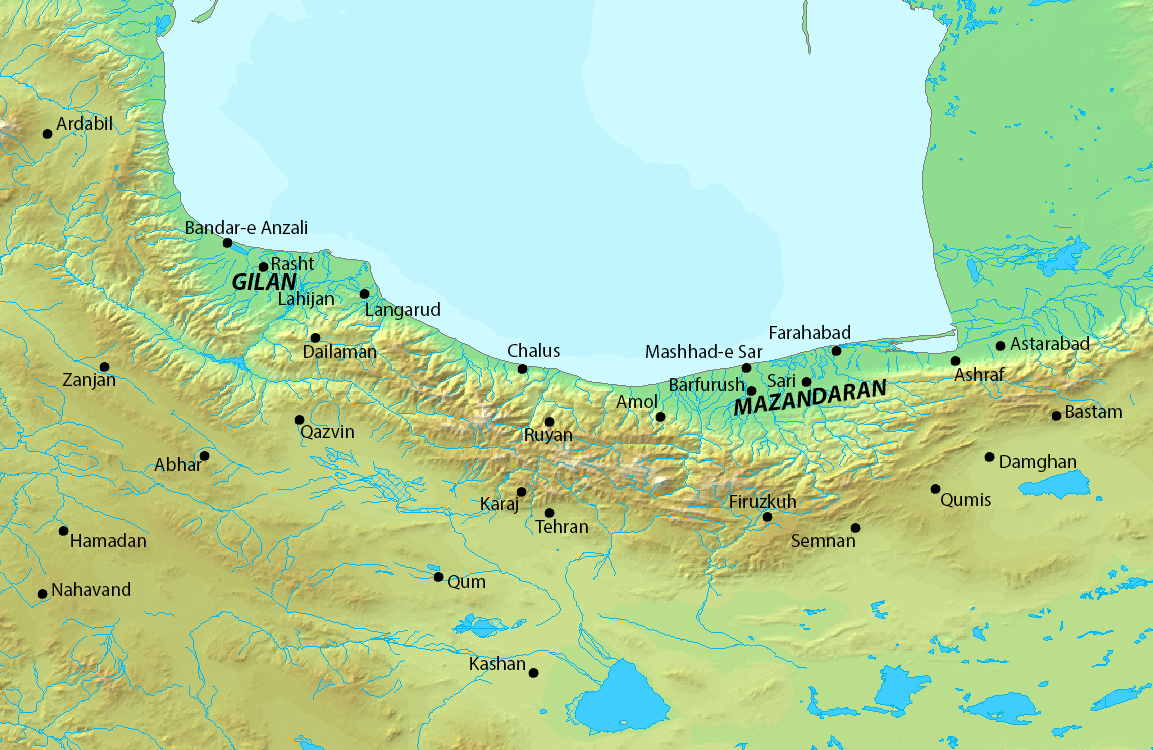
Map of northern Iran

Ali-Qoli Khan Qajar was born c. 1756 in Astarabad (present-day Gorgan). According to the later court historian Mohammad-Taqi "Lesan ol-Molk" Sepehr, he was Mohammad Hasan Khan's ninth and last son, a rank possibly inherited because his mother was of non-Qajar origin, rather than being connected to his actual age. After the defeat and death of his father in 1759, Ali-Qoli Khan was brought to Qazvin as a captive of Karim Khan of the Zand dynasty. Ali-Qoli Khan was then moved to the Zand capital of Shiraz where he was raised, together with his brothers, under the surveillance of the Zand rulers.

Following Karim Khan's death in 1779, confusion erupted which enabled Ali-Qoli Khan to accompany his eldest brother Agha Mohammad Khan to Astarabad. This event marked the beginning for Ali-Qoli Khan of what would become roughly twenty years of service (with brief intervals) under his eldest brother, taking part in Agha Mohammad Khan's endeavours to establish control over all of Iran. In contrast to Agha Mohammad Khan's full brothers, Ali-Qoli Khan was his steadfast associate from the start.

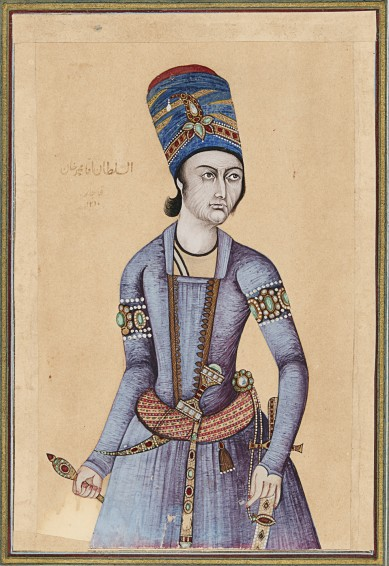
A portrait of Agha Mohammad Khan, dated 1795

Ali-Qoli Khan rarely matched the military prowess of his older brothers and was never able to obtain an independent position in the Qajar tribe. He was reportedly nicknamed Agha Baji by Agha Mohammad Khan, a derogatory term meaning "effeminate master", which, as the modern historian Abbas Amanat explains, may refer to certain feminine traits in his behavior or his lack of cruelty. Nevertheless, Ali-Qoli Khan's support of Agha Mohammad Khan did help the latter in 1779–1782 during early conflicts with his brothers over power.

=== Campaigns ===
In 1781, Ali-Qoli Khan and Agha Mohammad Khan were successful in ousting the Kurdish and Arab tribal chiefs of northern Khorasan out of the town of Semnan, in the historical region of Qumis. For his assistance in the conquest of this area, Ali-Qoli Khan was subsequently given Semnan as a fiefdom (soyurgal). Subsequently, Ali-Qoli Khan would play a pivotal role in subduing Khvar and Varamin, near Tehran, putting them under Agha Mohammad Khan's control. This region was the seat of the rival Develu clan of the Qajar tribe, whose loyalty and support were deemed essential for tribal unity. This factor may have added to Agha Mohammad Khan's decision to designate nearby Tehran as his capital several years later, in 1795.

In 1783, as a result of the continued struggle between the Zands and the Qajars, Ali-Qoli Khan decided to make a bid for power. Having abandoned Agha Mohammad Khan, he made peace with the Zand chiefs, which, as the modern historian Abbas Amanat explains, was perhaps intended to gain authority over central Iran. Agha Mohammad Khan Qajar was forced to retreat to Astarabad. However, this retreat was short lived, for the reduction of Zand power allowed him to regain his former position. Ali-Qoli Khan repented before Agha Mohammad Khan, now engaging in the cycle of betrayal and reconciliation that characterized Agha Mohammad Khan's relationships with his other brothers. As Agha Mohammad Khan was able to tighten his position in the north of the country, Ali-Qoli Khan, carrying the banner of Agha Mohammad Khan yet again, was ordered to fight in a series of six campaigns which resulted in the elimination of the Zands and other minor states in southern Iran. Ali-Qoli Khan conquered the remainder of the Fayli Lors in the southwestern-most part of the country. Two years later, in 1787–1788, he partnered again with Agha Mohammad Khan during an unsuccessful campaign against Fars.

Returning from Fars, Ali-Qoli Khan was appointed governor of Isfahan by Agha Mohammad Khan, replacing their brother Jafar-Qoli Khan Qajar, and was assigned 2,000 troops stationed in the city to command. With Agha Mohammad Khan on his way to Tehran, however, Jafar Khan Zand (r. 1785–1789) began preparing yet another invasion of Isfahan. Ali-Qoli Khan, learning of this plan, sent a force of Qaraguzlu tribesmen to hold Qumishah, but the advancing Zand army led by Jafar Khan Zand were superior in number and overwhelmed them. Ali-Qoli Khan then retreated to Kashan, leaving Isfahan open to Jafar Khan Zand. Not long after, however, together with his older brother, Ali-Qoli Khan returned and retook the city. In 1789–1790, Ali-Qoli Khan, during Agha Mohammad Khan's second Fars campaign, commanded a contingent of 7,000 soldiers and bested the Lor tribes that roamed in Kohgiluyeh. Much of his success in Kohgiluyeh was not necessarily due to his military tactics or prowess, but because the tribes were willing to repudiate their allegiance to the unstable Zands and submit themselves to the Qajars.

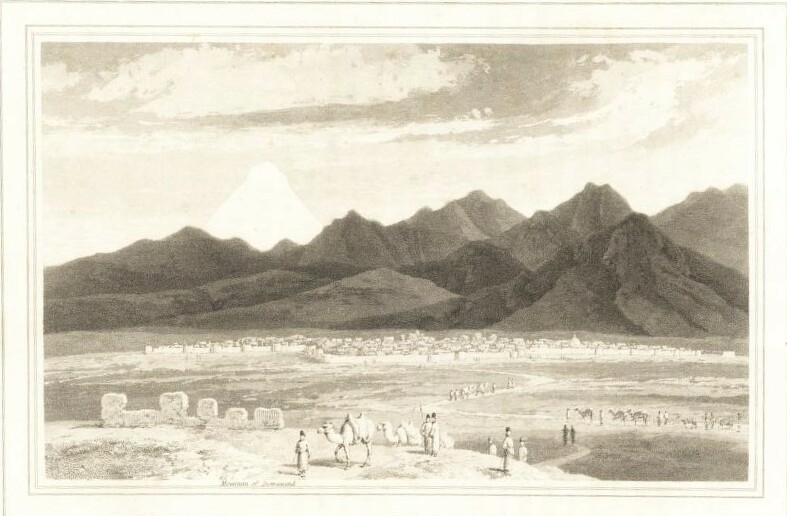
A view of Tehran in 1808/1809, from James Justinian Morier's A Journey through Iran, Armenia and Asia Minor to Constantinople in the years 1808 and 1809, published in 1812

Ali-Qoli Khan took part in Agha Mohammad Khan's attack on Kerman in 1794 and was responsible for taking Shahr-e Babak and Sirjan. He was later ordered to assert control over Lar. Ali-Qoli Khan also took part in the campaigns in Azerbaijan and the Caucasus in 1795. During the latter campaign, he was first sent to Shirvan followed by Erivan (Erevan). Ali-Qoli Khan intended to replace Mostafa Khan-e Davalu with Mostafa Khan-e Talesh following the former's death as a result of a local uprising by the population of Shirvan. However, after taking tribute (kharaj), Ali-Qoli Khan left Mostafa Khan-e Talesh in his post and moved back to Tehran.

=== Succession claim and downfall ===
In 1797, during Agha Mohammad Khan's final campaign in the Caucasus, Ali-Qoli Khan was ordered to hold Erivan. At this point, Ali-Qoli Khan had become the only surviving brother of Agha Mohammad Khan who had not been exiled or physically disabled. Following Agha Mohammad Khan's assassination in June 1797 in Shusha and the ensuing turmoil, Ali-Qoli Khan would proclaim himself the rightful successor to his older brother. According to the French naturalist Guillaume Antoine Olivier, who was travelling through Iran at the time, Ali-Qoli Khan had first proclaimed himself Shah in Mazandaran. Other sources, however, suggest that Ali-Qoli Khan left Erivan and marched down via Khoy, Tabriz and Maragheh towards Tehran, with the intention of seizing the newly established capital. The gates of the city had been closed by its governor (beglarbeg) Mirza Mohammad Khan Develu since 1795, however, and thus Ali-Qoli Khan was forced to encamp at a village some fifty kilometres west of Tehran, known as Alishah Avaz (now the city of Shahriar). His stay at the village was probably intended to recruit more troops in order to storm Tehran by force.

Simultaneously, however, his young nephew, Baba Khan, soon to be Fath-Ali Shah (r. 1797–1834), the second shah of the Qajar dynasty, entered Tehran through the acquiescence of Mirza Mohammad Khan. On the advice of Hajji Ebrahim Shirazi, Baba Khan sent his brother Hosayn-Qoli Khan II to invite Ali-Qoli Khan to the palace in Tehran, under the feigned pretext of discussing succession. When Ali-Qoli Khan arrived, he was not allowed to enter the palace accompanied by his armed attendants. Ali-Qoli Khan was physically obliged to bow to Baba Khan and, cursing him all the while, was led to a room where he was blinded. Ali-Qoli Khan was then sent to Barforush (now Babol) in Mazandaran, where he remained until his death in 1824.

Ali-Qoli Khan based his claim to succession on his loyalty to Agha Mohammad Khan, having accompanied him throughout the conquest of Iran, and as the sole surviving son of Mohammad Hasan Khan. Based on these arguments, he considered it his right to ascend the throne. The claim, however, was void from the start because, in the contemporaneous Qajar system of power, concepts of kinship and "purity" of blood were major focal points in the transmission of right and dignity. As Ali-Qoli Khan had been born to a non-Qajar mother, he was ineligible for such right. In addition, under the earlier Qajars, a "legitimate" claim to the Iranian throne had to be imposed by military and political power—qualities that Ali-Qoli Khan did not possess. Furthermore, Baba Khan had long been prepared by Agha Mohammad Khan for succession.

== Sources ==
- Amanat, A. (1985). "ʿALĪ-QOLĪ KHAN". In Yarshater, Ehsan (ed.). Encyclopædia Iranica. Vol. I/8: Alafrank–Alp Arslan. London and New York: Routledge & Kegan Paul. pp. 874–875. ISBN 978-0-71009-097-3.
- Ebrahimnejad, Hormoz (2007). "ʿAlī Qulī Khān". In Fleet, Kate; Krämer, Gudrun; Matringe, Denis; Nawas, John; Rowson, Everett (eds.). Encyclopaedia of Islam (3rd ed.). Brill Online. ISSN 1873-9830.
- Hambly, Gavin R.G. (1991). "Āghā Muḥammad Khān and the establishment of the Qājār dynasty". In Avery, Peter; Hambly, Gavin R. G.; Melville, Charles Peter (eds.). The Cambridge History of Iran: From Nadir Shah to the Islamic Republic. Vol. 7. Cambridge: Cambridge University Press. ISBN 0-521-20095-4.
- Heyat, Farideh (2000). "Azeri Professional Women's Life Strategies in the Soviet Context". In Acar, Feride; Günes-Ayata, Ayşe (eds.). Gender and Identity Construction: Women of Central Asia, the Caucasus and Turkey. Brill. ISBN 978-9004492028.
