= Mahdi Qoli Khan Qajar =

18th-century Iranian prince and commander

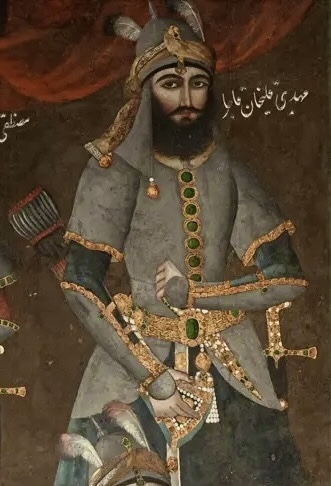
Mahdi Qoli Khan by Abdallah Khan featured in Soleymaniyeh Palace, Karaj.

Mahdi Qoli Khan Qajar (Persian: مهدی قلی خان قاجار; born 1754 in Gorgan, Zand Iran; died 1784 in Gorgan) was a son of Mohammad Hasan Khan Qajar and brother of Agha Mohammad Khan Qajar.

He was the father of Ebrahim Khan Zahir-od-Dowleh. After his death, Asiya Khanum married Fath-Ali Shah Qajar.

== Sources ==
- Bamdad, Mehdi (1978). شرح حال رجال ایران در قرن ۱۲ و ۱۳ و ۱۴ هجری [Biographies of Iranian Elites in 17-20th Centuries] (in Persian). Zavvar.
- Hambly, Gavin R.G (1991). "Agha Muhammad Khan and the establishment of the Qajar dynasty". The Cambridge History of Iran, Vol. 7: From Nadir Shah to the Islamic Republic. Cambridge: Cambridge University Press. pp. 104–144. ISBN 9780521200950.
- Khavari, Mirza Fazlollah Shirazi (1845). Tarikh Zol Qarnein (تاریخ ذوالقرنین) (in Persian). Ministry of Culture and Islamic Guidance of Iran.
