= Fath-Ali Khan Qajar =

Qajar chieftain (1685/6–1726)

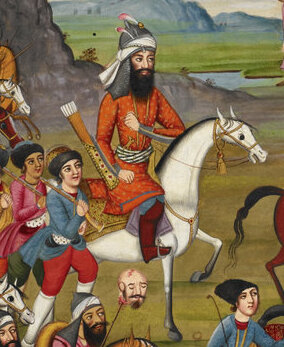
- A victorious Fath-Ali Khan Qajar is greeted by the people of Isfahan. Folio from the Shahanshahnameh of Fath-Ali Khan Saba, dated 1810

Governor of Astarabad
- In office 1717–?
- Monarch: Soltan Hoseyn
- Preceded by: Rostam Mohammad Khan Sa'dlu
- Succeeded by: ?

Personal details
- Born: 1685/86 Safavid Iran
- Died: 11 October 1726 (aged 42) Safavid Iran
- Children: Mohammad Hasan Khan Qajar

Military service
- Allegiance: Safavid Iran

Fath-Ali Khan Qajar (Persian: فتحعلی‌خان قاجار) was the chieftain of the Ashaqa-bash branch of the Qajar tribe at Astarabad during the collapse of the Safavid dynasty of Iran.

== Background ==
Born in 1685/86, Fath-Ali Khan was the son of Shahqoli Khan and a member of the Ashaqa-bash branch of the Turkoman Qajar tribe at Astarabad. The Ashaqa-bash was one of the two main branches of the Qajar tribe in Astarabad (the other being the Yukhari-bash), and was composed of the subtribes of Qoyunlu (or Qovanlu), Izz al-dinlu, Sham Bayati, Qara Musanlu (Musalu?), Washlu (Ashlu?) and Ziyadlu. During the reign of Shah Abbas I (r. 1588–1629), some Qajar tribes were relocated to Astarabad to defend against incursions by the Yaka Turkmen. By the late 17th century, the vast majority of the Qajar seemingly lived in Astarabad.

== Biography ==
According to the Iranologist Abd al-Hosayn Nava'i, "Much of the information about Fath-Ali Khan's early career must be used cautiously as it is based mainly on chronicles from the Qajar period intent on presenting the career of the immediate forefathers of the dynasty in a flatteringly heroic manner." During the reign of Soltan Hoseyn (r. 1694–1722), Fath-Ali Khan and his brothers Fazl-Ali Khan and Mehr Ali Beyg were attacked at their fortress of Mobarakabad by the governor of Astarabad, Rostam Mohammad Khan Sa'dlu. This was done to attempt to thwart the rising authority of the Ashaqa-bash. Fath-Ali Khan's two brothers were killed, but he managed to flee and seek safety among the Yomut Turkmen. They assisted Fath-Ali Khan in overthrowing Rostam Mohammad Khan Sa'dlu so that Fath-Ali Khan could assume governorship over Astarabad in 1717.

Fath-Ali Khan's role during the collapse of the Safavid government, including the Afghan siege of Isfahan in 1722, remains uncertain. According to one story, he and 2,000–3,000 of his soldiers sneaked into Isfahan, and through "pure bravery", managed to shift the circumstances in favour of the Safavids. However, Fath-Ali Khan was soon forced to depart to avoid possible imprisonment after jealous courtiers persuaded Soltan Hoseyn that Fath-Ali Khan was too ambitious to have as an ally. Later Qajar sources generally report the same narrative. However, this story is not mentioned by contemporary figures such as Judasz Tadeusz Krusinski, Mohammad Mohsen, or Hazin Lahiji, which makes its authenticity uncertain.

On 11 October 1726, Shah Tahmasp II had Fath-Ali Khan executed for treason.

== Sources ==
- Floor, Willem (2008). Titles and Emoluments in Safavid Iran: A Third Manual of Safavid Administration, by Mirza Naqi Nasiri. Washington, D.C.: Mage Publishers. ISBN 978-1933823232.
- Nava'i, Abd al-Hosayn (1999). "Fatḥ-ʿAlī Khan Qājār". In Yarshater, Ehsan (ed.). Encyclopædia Iranica. Vol. IX/4: Fārs II–Fauna III. London and New York: Routledge & Kegan Paul. pp. 406–407. ISBN 978-0-933273-32-0.
- Lambton, A.K.S. (1978). "Ḳād̲j̲ār". In van Donzel, E.; Lewis, B.; Pellat, Ch. & Bosworth, C. E. (eds.). The Encyclopaedia of Islam, Second Edition. Volume IV: Iran–Kha. Leiden: E. J. Brill. pp. 387–399. ISBN 978-90-04-05745-6. OCLC 758278456.
- Sümer, Faruk (1978). "Ḳād̲j̲ār". In van Donzel, E.; Lewis, B.; Pellat, Ch. & Bosworth, C. E. (eds.). The Encyclopaedia of Islam, Second Edition. Volume IV: Iran–Kha. Leiden: E. J. Brill. p. 387. ISBN 978-90-04-05745-6. OCLC 758278456.
