= Battle of Astarabad (1759) =

Conflict between the Zand and Qajar in Iran

- Part of Qajar-Zand Wars
Date	14 February 1759
Location	Astarabad, Iran 36.846667°N 54.43°E
Result	Zand victory
Territorial changes	Astarabad annexed by the Zands

Belligerents
Zand dynasty	Qajars

Commanders and leaders
Karim Khan Zand; Shaykh Ali Khan Zand	Mohammad Hasan Khan †; Agha Mohammad Khan (POW)

Strength
Larger	Smaller; consisted of fickle Kurdish and Turkic tribesmen

The Battle of Astarabad, otherwise known as the Battle of Ashraf was fought outside the city of Astarabad on 14 February 1759, between the forces of Karim Khan Zand, commanded by Shaykh Ali Khan Zand, and Mohammad Hasan Khan Qajar. The battle resulted in a total Qajar defeat and caused the death of Mohammad Hasan Khan Qajar, ending the Qajar threat to the Zand dynasty until the conquests of Agha Mohammad Khan Qajar.

== Background ==
After the aborted siege of Shiraz in 1758, the Qajars retreated north. During their hasty retreat, they failed to retain previously captured territory due to a series of mutinies by Fath-Ali Khan Afshar and Shahbaz Khan Donbali, along with other high-ranking Qajar officers. The politically important city of Isfahan was also abandoned by Qajar forces under Hoseyn Khan Develu, while Mohammad Hasan Khan Qajar himself sought to fall back to Astarabad along with Ismail III. Karim Khan Zand quickly marched north and captured Tehran. Shaykh Ali Khan Zand began attacking Qajar strongholds in Mazandaran. Unable to breach Qajar lines, Shaykh Ali Khan Zand marched to Astarabad, forcing Mohammad Hasan Khan Qajar to prepare for its defence.

== Battle ==
Mohammad Hasan Khan Qajar decided to force a battle before Shaykh Ali Khan Zand could be reinforced by Karim Khan Zand, who was residing in Tehran. The two armies met outside Astarabad and engaged in a battle on 14 February 1759, which resulted in a decisive Zand victory. Mohammad Hasan Khan Qajar was killed by Kurdish units under the command of Hoseyn Khan Develu.

== Aftermath ==
Astarabad proceeded to be captured by the Zands, which provided a large sum of wealth. Ismail III was also recovered by the Zands, which allowed Karim Khan Zand to legitimize himself as Vakil. Hoseyn Khan Develu was appointed as Beglerbegi by Karim Khan Zand to assure control of the region. Agha Mohammad Khan Qajar would later be captured by the Zands and sent to Shiraz as a hostage. Mohammad Hasan Khan Qajar's family members were reportedly treated humanely by Karim Khan Zand.
