= Shaykh Ali Khan Zand =

- شیخ علی خان زند
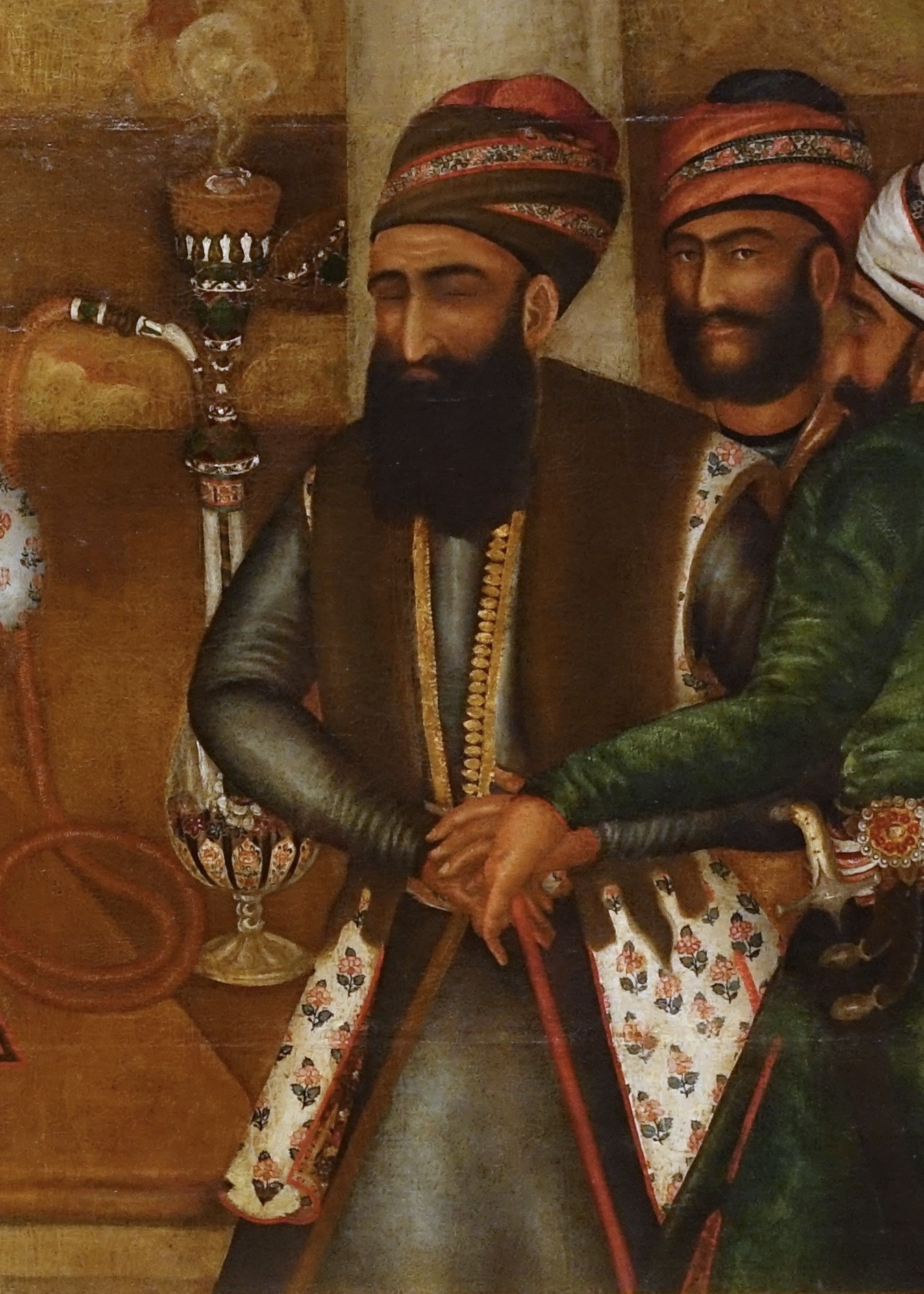
- Shaykh Ali Khan (detail), Karim Khan Zand amidst his close circle, sometimes attributed to Mohammad Sadeq, probably 19th century, oil on canvas.
- Died: 1779; Shiraz, Zand Iran
- Military career
- Conflicts: Zand campaigns in Kurdistan and Luristan; Siege of Kermanshah; Battle of Qara Chaman; Qajar-Zand Wars; Siege of Astarabad; Battle of Kazzaz; Siege of Shiraz; Battle of Astarabad

Shaykh Ali Khan Zand (Persian: شیخ علی خان زند, romanized: Shaikh Alī Khān Zand) was a Zand nobleman, who was a close associate and prominent lieutenant of his cousin Karim Khan Zand (r. 1751–1779). However, he later clashed with the latter, who had him blinded. He afterwards lived the rest of his life as an honored representative of the court, until a civil war occurred after Karim Khan's death in 1779, where Shaykh Ali Khan was killed by his cousin, Zaki Khan Zand.

== Biography ==
Shaykh Ali Khan was the son of Mihr Ali Zand, who was the brother of Inaq Khan Zand and father of Karim Khan Zand, which thus makes Shaykh Ali Khan and Karim Khan cousins. Shaykh Ali Khan had two brothers named Nazar Ali Khan and Ali Khan Zand. He is first mentioned in the spring of 1754, when he and his relative Mohammad Khan Zand were captured by the Bakhtiari warlord Ali Mardan Khan Bakhtiari, who was waging war with Karim Khan over the throne of Iran. He took them into his encampment near Kermanshah, and began negotiating with them about the possibility of an alliance, which, however, proved fruitless. The two Zand nobles, at a coordinated signal, attacked Ali Mardan and killed him with his own dagger.

They then made their escape from the encampment and reunited with Karim Khan, whom they gave the pleasing announcement that Karim Khan's rival was no longer an issue. Some time later, the Pashtun military leader Azad Khan Afghan, who ruled in Azerbaijan, won a great victory over the Zand forces, making them withdraw to their stronghold in Pari, which Shaykh Ali Khan and Mohammad Khan was given the order to defend, whilst Karim Khan, Sadeq Khan, and Eskandar Khan left for Isfahan. However, Azad Khan managed to bait the two Zand nobles out of Pari, and had them, along with 15 other members of Karim Khan's family, taken as captives. Not long afterwards, Shaykh Ali Khan and Mohammad Khan succeeded in escaping, and slayed the guard in charge of watching the captives.

Shaykh Ali Khan is later mentioned by historians as being very haughty and autonomous in the early 1760s, which was seen as a threat to Karim Khan's rule. Furthermore, he was also "charged by the chroniclers with misappropriation of booty and provincial revenue, and with cruelty and extortion in dealing with conquered populations." They then started argumenting fiercely; tensions rose high, and the two kinsmen clashed with each other, which resulted in Karim Khan having him blinded. In the words of John R. Perry, "it can only be concluded that Karim Khan saw such arrogance and obstinacy from one who had hitherto been his close personal friend and most able lieutenant as a genuine threat to his rule, and as a dangerous crack in the united Zand front at a still critical period."

They did, however, later resolve their conflict; Shaykh Ali Khan lived the rest of his life as an honored representative of the court, and never showed signs of treason. Karim Khan later died on 1 March 1779—following his death, civil war broke out. Zaki Khan Zand, in an alliance with Ali-Morad Khan Zand, declared Karim Khan's incapable and youngest son Mohammad Ali Khan Zand as the new Zand ruler, whilst Shaykh Ali Khan and his brother Nazar Ali Khan, along with other notables, supported Karim Khan's elder son, Abol-Fath Khan Zand. However, not long after, Zaki Khan baited Shaykh Ali Khan and Nazar Ali Khan out of the fortress of Shiraz, and had them slaughtered.

== Offspring ==
Shaykh Ali Khan married the sister of Karim Khan, who bore him six sons and at least one daughter;

- Kalb Ali Khan Zand
- Ebrahim Khan Zand
- Ali Khan Zand
- Abbas Ali Khan Zand
- Hossein Ali Khan Zand
- Fath Ali Khan Zand
- Maryam Begum Zand, who married the Qajar shah Fath-Ali Shah Qajar (r. 1797–1834).

== Sources ==
- Perry, John (1991). "The Zand dynasty". The Cambridge History of Iran, Vol. 7: From Nadir Shah to the Islamic Republic. Cambridge: Cambridge University Press. pp. 1–63. ISBN 9780521200950.
