= Abbas Qoli Khan Qajar =

Qajar prince

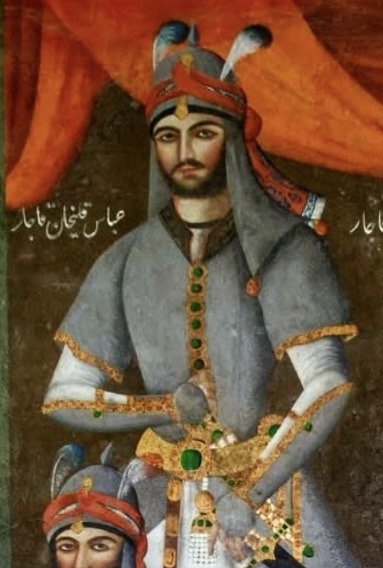
Abbas-Qoli Khan Qajar featured in a painting in Soleimanie palace, Karaj, Iran.

Abbas Qoli Khan Qajar (Persian: عباس قلیخان قاجار); was a Qajar prince. He was the son of Mohammad Hasan Khan Qajar and brother to Agha Mohammad Shah.

== Bibliography ==
- Hambly, Gavin R.G (1991). "Agha Muhammad Khan and the establishment of the Qajar dynasty". The Cambridge History of Iran, Vol. 7: From Nadir Shah to the Islamic Republic. Cambridge: Cambridge University Press. pp. 104–144. ISBN 9780521200950.
