= Qovanlu =

A branch of Qajar tribe

Qovanlu (Persian: قوانلو) also spelled as Qavanlu, Qawanlu and Qoyunlu is a branch of the Qajar tribe, whose are established the Qajar dynasty of Iran.

Qajars were one of the original Turkoman Qizilbash tribes, whose supplied power to the Safavids since the earliest days of dynasty. With the fall of the safavids in 1736, qajars had split into several factions. One of the most prominent ones being the Devellu, which often fought against the Qovanlu.

== Sources ==
- Perry, John R. (1984). "Āḡā Moḥammad Khan Qājār". In Yarshater, Ehsan (ed.). Encyclopædia Iranica (Online ed.). Encyclopædia Iranica Foundation.
- Fukasawa, Katsumi (2017). Religious interactions in Europe and the Mediterranean world coexistence and dialogue from the 12th to the 20th centuries. Oxon: Taylor & Francis. ISBN 9781315181387.
- Elton L., Daniel (2001). The history of Iran. Westport, Connecticut: Greenwood Press.
- Atkin, Muriel (1980). Russia and Iran, 1780-1828 (New ed.). Minnesota: University of Minnesota Press. ISBN 978-0-8166-5697-4. JSTOR 10.5749/j.ctttsxj8.
