= Qajar (tribe) =

Turkoman tribe

Qajars
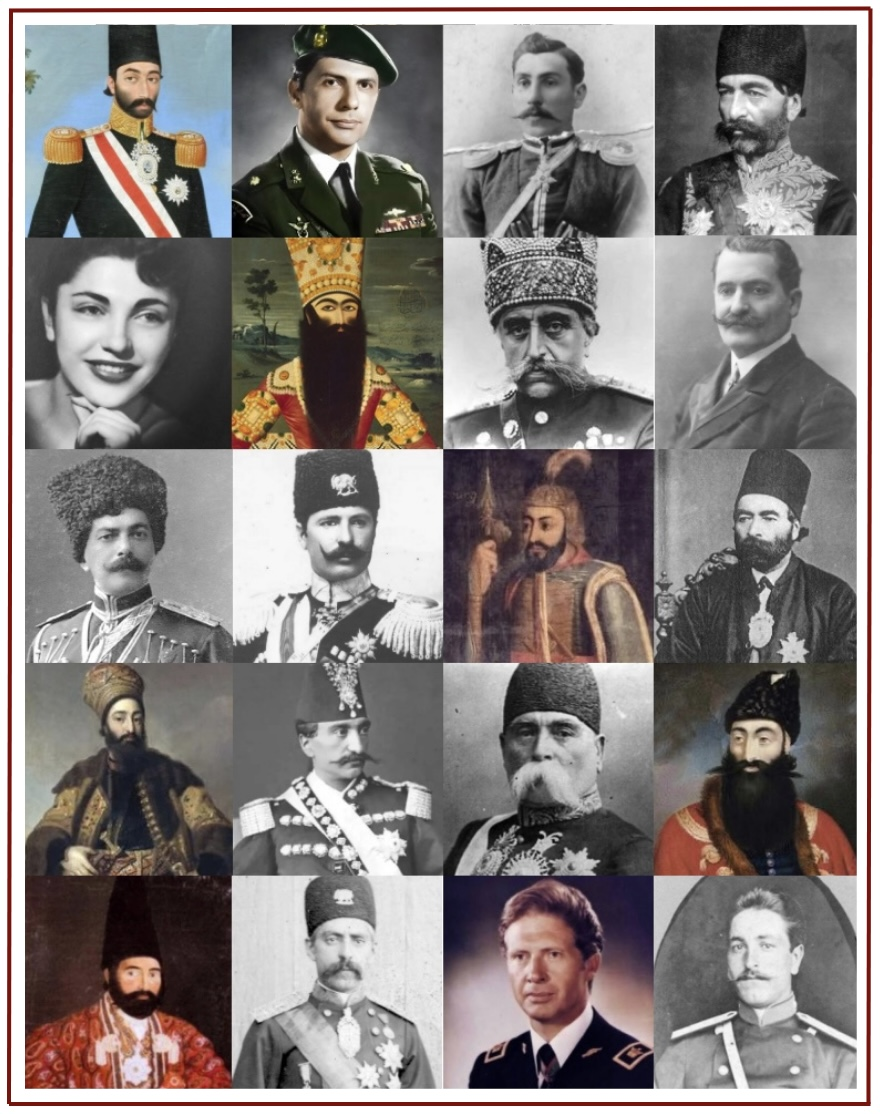

Total population
- Over 35,000 (1994)

Regions with significant populations
- Iran

Languages
- Persian; Iranian Azerbaijani

Religion
- Twelver Shia Islam

Related ethnic groups
- Oghuz Turks

The Qajars (Persian: ایل قاجار, romanized: Ēl-i Qājār; Azerbaijani: قاجارلار, romanized: Qacarlar) (Note: also spelled Kadjars, Kajars, Kadzhars, Cadzhars, Cadjars, Ghajars, etc.) are a clan of the Bayat tribe of the Oghuz Turks. The tribe lived in the area that is now Armenia, Azerbaijan and Northwestern Iran. Some, including Olson, consider them to be a tribal subgroup of Iranian Azerbaijanis.

By the end of the Safavid era, the Qajars had split into several factions. These included the Ziyādoghlu (Ziādlu), associated with the area of Ganja and Yerevan, as well as the Qoyunlu (Qāvānlu), and Davālu (Devehlu) the latter two associated with the northern areas of contemporary Iran. In 1796, Agha Mohammad Khan, a Qajar chief of the Qoyunlu branch, was crowned Shah of Iran, founding the Qajar dynasty, which ruled Iran until 1925. American anthropologist Richard Weeks also notes that some Iranian Azerbaijanis, depending on their place of residence, use the designation Qajar.

== Background ==
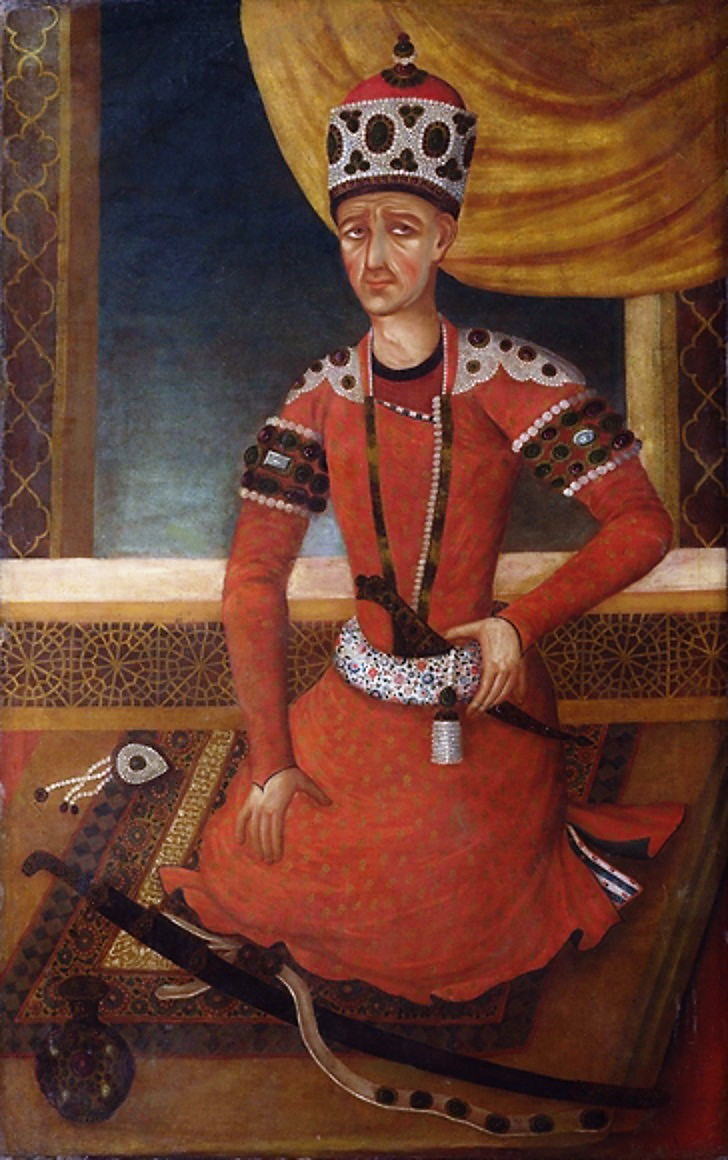
Agha Mohammad Khan Qajar Founder of the Qajar dynasty.

The Qajars were one of the original Turkoman Qizilbash tribes. They later supplied power to the Safavids since this dynasty's earliest days. Numerous members of the Qajar tribe held prominent ranks in the Safavid state. In 1794, a Qajar chieftain, Agha Mohammad Khan, a member of the Qoyunlu branch of the Qajars, founded the Qajar dynasty which replaced the Zand dynasty in Iran. He launched his campaign from his power base south of the Caspian Sea, capturing its capital Isfahan in 1785. A year later, Tehran accepted Agha Mohammad's authority.

According to An Ethnohistorical Dictionary of the Russian and Soviet Empires by Olson et al., which was published in 1994 and specifically deals with the ethnography of the Russian Empire and Soviet Union, the Qajars were historically a Turkic tribe that lived in Armenia. They resettled in the region of Azerbaijan during the 17th and 18th centuries.

Olson et al. add that in the 1980s the Qajar population exceeded 35,000 people, most of whom lived in Iran.

== In Turkey ==
According to Faruk Sümer, the Ağca Koyunlu tribe was one of the four branches forming the Qajars. In the Ottoman tribal registers, the Ağca Koyunlu tribe, shown as a nomadic (hayme-nişin) Turkmen Yörük tribe, is seen to have spread over a wide geography including Aleppo, Zile, Sivas, Adana, Gönen, Kula, Bursa, Kayseri, Maraş, Konya, Karaman, Mihaliç and Tarsus. Located in the Eski Kaçerli (Old Kaçerli) neighborhood of Emirdağ, a mosque is named after the Qajars. In this regard, in a decree sent by Ottoman sultan Ahmed III to the Beylerbey of Rakka stated that the tribes from the Muslucalu community of Bozulus Turkmens, including the Qajars, were settled in today's Emirdağ.

== See also ==
- Qajar family tree
- Qajar dynasty

== Sources ==
- Akiner, Shiran (1983) Islamic Peoples of the Soviet Union Kegan Paul International, London, ISBN 0-7103-0025-5
- Atkin, Muriel (1980). Russia and Iran, 1780–1828. U of Minnesota Press. ISBN 978-0-8166-5697-4.
- Wixman, Ronald (1984) The Peoples of the USSR: An Ethnographic Handbook
