= Morteza Qoli Khan Qajar =

18th-century Iranian prince

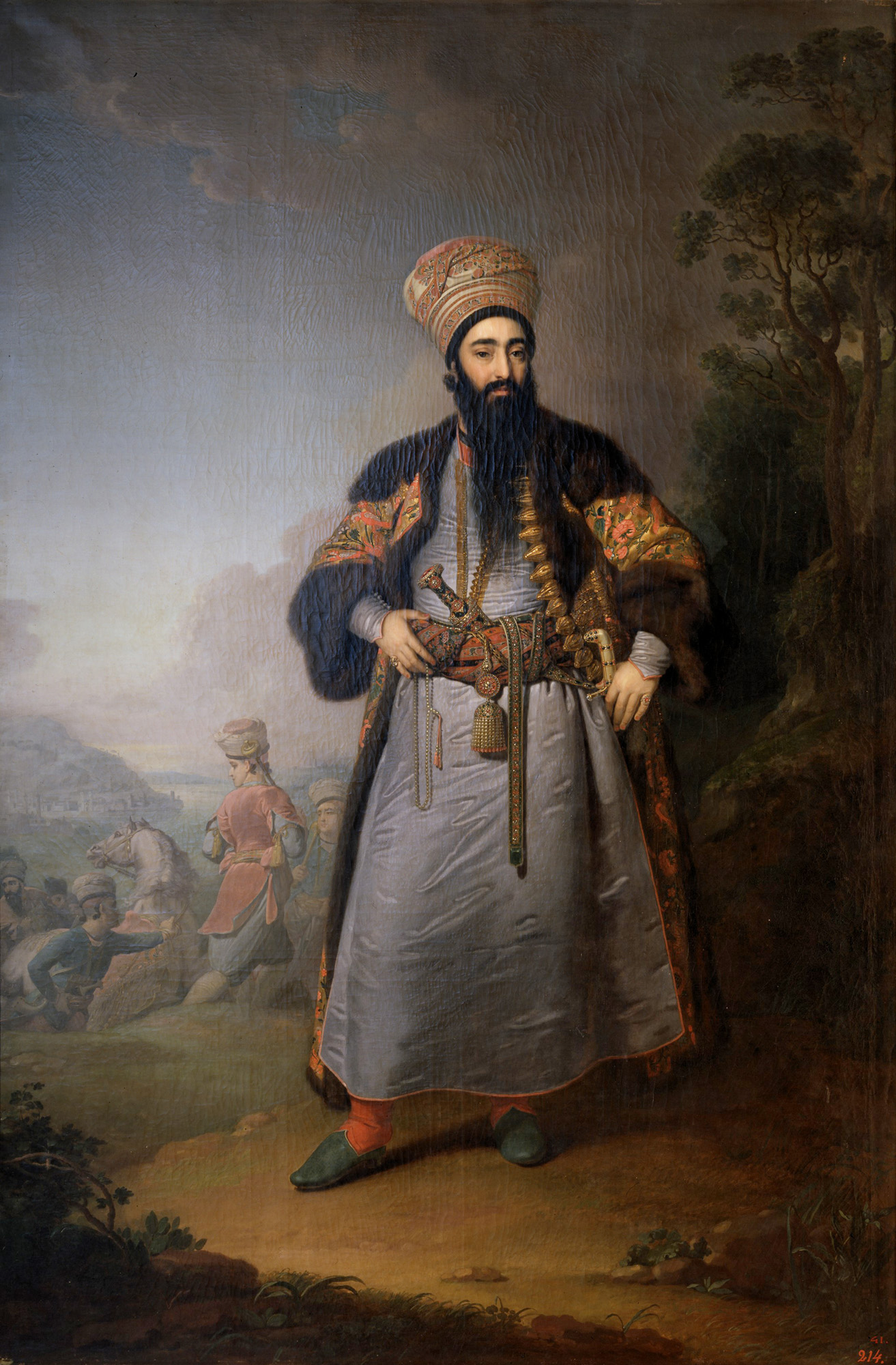
- Portrait by Vladimir Borovikovsky (1796)
- Born: 1750 or 1755; Iran (under civil war)
- Died: 1800; Astrakhan, Russian Empire
- Burial: Al-Atabat Al-Aliyat (now in Iraq)
- Issue: See below
- Dynasty: Qajar
- Father: Mohammad Hasan Khan Qajar

Morteza Qoli Khan Qajar (Persian: مرتضی قلی خان قاجار, 1750/1755 in Iran – 1800 in Astrakhan, Russia) was an Iranian prince of the Qajar dynasty, and the brother of Agha Mohammad Khan Qajar. A protégé of the Russian Empire, he lived in St. Petersburg at the end of the reign of Catherine the Great.

== Biography ==
Around the mid-18th century, after the murder of Nader Shah, widespread crisis began; out of this, eventually, after some decades of Zand rule, Agha Mohammad Khan of the Qajar tribe emerged victorious. As a result, he became the new shah of Iran. Related to the same course of history, was Russia's role. Russia was actively meddling in domestic Iranian affairs since the downfall of the Safavids and the Russo-Persian War (1722–1723) of about the same time. Though Russia's political ambitions ceased when the powerful Nader Shah emerged, they started again after Nader's death in 1747.

In 1787, a last attempt was made to reach an agreement between Agha Mohammad Khan and the government of Catherine II. Thereafter, Russia decided to deal with his rebel brother, Morteza Qoli, whom it intended to install on the Iranian throne as the tsaritsa's vassal. Morteza, fleeing from his brother, came to St. Petersburg, where he was well received by Empress Catherine II, who pursued political goals against Iran. Catherine however delayed the plan until the 1796 expedition.

== Children ==
Morteza Qoli Khan had five daughters and two sons. One of his daughters married his nephew, Fath-Ali Shah Qajar, three daughters married Fath-Ali Shah's sons, and one daughter married Mostafa Qoli Khan (Morteza Qoli Khan's brother). His children are:

- Mehr-Ali Khan (died 1838), a general of the Lurs army under Fath-Ali Shah in Kermanshah and Sonqor and a trader
- Mohammad Hosein Khan, lived in Azerbaijan, Iran
- Kheir o-Nesa Khanum (died before 1845), married Fath-Ali Shah; died in Golpayegan and buried in Al-Atabat Al-Aliyat (now in Iraq)
- Saraye Malek Khanum, married Mohammad-Qoli Mirza Molk-Ara
- Galin Khanum, married Mohammad Vali Mirza
- 4th daughter, married Hasan Ali Mirza
- 5th daughter, married Agha Khan (or Abagha Khan) who was a son of Mostafa Qoli Khan (Morteza Qoli Khan's brother)

== Final years ==
In 1784, Morteza Qoli Khan, due to the consequence of opposing his brother Agha Mohammad Khan, fled to Russia and sought refuge with the Russian tsar, Catherine II. Thereafter, he lived a happy and successful life in Russia. During the reign of Fath-Ali Shah Qajar (r. 1797–1834), he lived three years (i.e., until 1800) and finally died in Hajji Tarkhan (Astrakhan), Russia. Morteza Qoli Khan's body was first brought to Iran, then to Al-Atabat Al-Aliyat (now in Iraq), where he was buried.

== Sources ==
- Atkin, Muriel (1980). Russia and Iran, 1780-1828. University of Minnesota Press. ISBN 978-0816656974.
- Azodi, Ahmad Mirza Azdo-Dowleh (1887). تاریخ عضدی [Azodi History] (in Persian). Maharat.
- Bamdad, Mehdi (1978). شرح حال رجال ایران در قرن ۱۲ و ۱۳ و ۱۴ هجری [Biographies of Iranian Elites in 17-20th Centuries] (in Persian). Zavvar.
- Khavari, Mirza Fazlollah Shirazi (1845). Tarikh Zol Qarnein (تاریخ ذوالقرنین) (in Persian). Ministry of Culture and Islamic Guidance of Iran.
