= Badralensa Khanum =

Iranian royal consort (19th century)

Badralensa Khanum (Persian: بدرالنساء خانم; 19th-century) was a consort of Fath-Ali Shah Qajar of Iran (r. 1797–1834).

She was a niece of Agha Mohammad Khan Qajar, the founder of the Qajar dynasty of Iran. She was one of the most influential women of the Qajar harem during the reign of Fath-Ali Shah. She was known for her conflict with Asiya Khanom Devellu.
