= Gowhar Khanum =

Daughter of Fath-Ali Shah

Gowhar Khanum (Persian: گوهرخانم) was a Qajar princess and the daughter of Fath-Ali Shah. The exact dates of her birth and death remain unknown.

== Biography ==
=== Family background ===
Gowhar Khanum was born into the illustrious Qajar family, and her mother, who shared her name, was Gowhar Khanum, the sister of Allah-Yar Khan Asef al-Dowleh. Her mother died shortly after giving birth, which was a significant event that led to Gowhar Khanum being given her mother's name as a tribute. Growing up in the Qajar court, she would have been surrounded by the complex political and cultural dynamics of the time, which emphasized the importance of marriage alliances among the nobility.

=== Marriages and offspring ===
Gowhar Khanum's life, like that of many Qajar princesses, was deeply intertwined with the political alliances of her family. Her marriages not only reinforced ties within the Qajar nobility but also strengthened the family's influence in Persian society.

Her first marriage was to Rostam Khan, the son of Ebrahim Khan Zahiroddoleh, a prominent figure in the Qajar court. Rostam Khan hailed from a distinguished lineage, and this marriage was likely arranged to consolidate power and alliances within the ruling family. The union produced a son named Khan Baba Khan, adding another branch to the sprawling Qajar family tree. The details of Khan Baba Khan's life are sparse, but being the grandson of Fath-Ali Shah and the son of a nobleman, he would have been a figure of some importance within the court.

Following the death of her first husband, Gowhar Khanum remarried, which was not uncommon for Qajar princesses of the time. Her second husband was Shahrokh Mirza, the full brother of her late first husband, Rostam Khan. This marriage was likely a strategic move to preserve alliances and maintain continuity within the family. Marrying a brother-in-law was a traditional practice in Persian aristocracy to keep estates and influence within the same familial line. From this marriage, Gowhar Khanum had another son, Mohammad Khan Amir al-Omera. The title Amir al-Omera (امیرالامراء; lit. Commander of Commanders), suggests that Mohammad Khan held a high-ranking military or administrative position within the Qajar state, further indicating the family's prominence.
