= Ali Mirza Zel as-Soltan =

19th-century prince and governor

Ali Mirza علی میرزا
- Ali Shah; Adel Shah
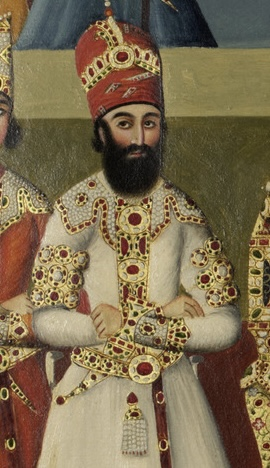
- Portrait, from a mural in the Negarestan Palace, by Abdallah Khan between 1816 and 1820

Shah of Iran (claimant)
- Reign: 11 November – 21 December 1834 (40 days)
- Coronation: 16 November 1834
- Opposing: Mohammad Shah Qajar

Governor of Tehran
- Tenure: 1816–1834 (18 years)
- Monarch: Fath-Ali Shah Qajar
- Predecessor: Esmail Mirza
- Born: c. July 1795; Shiraz, Qajar Iran
- Died: c. 1855 (aged c. 60); Karbala, Ottoman Empire
- Dynasty: Qajar
- Father: Fath-Ali Shah Qajar
- Mother: Asiya Khanum Devellu

Ali Mirza Zel-os-Soltan (Persian: علی میرزا ظل‌السلطان; born c. July 1795; died c. 1855), also known as Ali Shah (Persian: علی شاه) or Adel Shah (Persian: عادل شاه), was a Qajar prince, the governor of Tehran from 1816 to 1834, and a pretender to the throne of Qajar Iran in 1834.

== Early life ==
Ali Mirza was born to Fath-Ali Shah Qajar and Asiya Khanum Devellu in about July 1795 and was a full-brother of the prominent Qajar crown prince Abbas Mirza. Ali Mirza was nicknamed Ali Shah in 1796 by Agha Mohammad Khan following the coronation ceremony of the khan who became the shah of Iran and perceived the presence of his nephew Ali Mirza as a good omen, hence the nickname Ali Shah.

== Nickname Zel-os-Soltan ==
Due to similarity in appearance between Ali Mirza and his father Fath-Ali Shah, he was nicknamed Zel-os-Soltan, which literally means the shadow of the king.

== Governorship ==
=== Background ===
When Shoja-os-Saltaneh was appointed as the governor of Khorasan, the governorship of Tehran was assigned to Esmail Mirza, another son of Fath-Ali Shah. Since Esmail Mirza was very young, he was not performing governorship duties appropriately. On the other side, the residents of Tehran were in favor of Ali Mirza for this role. In 1816, once Fath-Ali Shah became confident that Shoja-os-Saltaneh was properly settled in his role as the governor of Khorasan, he appointed Ali Mirza as the governor of Tehran.

=== Tenure ===
In 1816, Ali Mirza was appointed as the governor of Tehran by Fath-Ali Shah. However, in practice, he exerted his power over many important affairs of the government.

Ali Mirza's minister was Mirza Mohammad Ali Khan Kashani.

== Succession to the Iranian throne ==
Following Fath-Ali Shah's death on 23 October 1834, Ali Mirza proclaimed himself as the shah of Iran in Tehran as Adel Shah Qajar. His rule lasted for 40 days, i.e., from 11 November to 21 December 1834, before he was deposed by Mohammad Shah Qajar.

== Imprisonment ==
Following the deposition from the Iranian throne, Ali Mirza was imprisoned in Ardabil. Eventually, he, together with two or three other princes, escaped the prison fort and went to Rome, Russia, and England.

== Final years ==
Ali Mirza spent his final years in Atabat Aliyat, Ottoman Empire.

== Marriage and children ==
Ali Mirza married multiple women and had twenty two children, including ten sons and twelve daughters.

Wives:

1. A daughter of Qahhar-Qoli Mirza, a son of Shahrokh Shah Afshar
2. A woman from Qom's elites
3. A daughter of Hossein Qoli Khan Qajar, brother of Fath-Ali Shah; married in July 1817

Sons:

1. Seif-ol-Molouk Mirza; mother: the daughter of Qahhar-Qoli Mirza
2. Mohammad Hosein Mirza
3. Seif-od-Dowleh Mirza; mother: the daughter of Qahhar-Qoli Mirza
4. Mohammad Taher Mirza
5. Shoja-od-Dowleh Mirza; mother: the daughter of Qahhar-Qoli Mirza
6. Davood Mirza
7. Yaqub Mirza
8. Abolqasem Mirza; mother: the woman from Qom's elites
9. Abolhasan Mirza; mother: the woman from Qom's elites
10. Abolfazl Mirza; mother: the woman from Qom's elites

Daughter:

1. A daughter; married Mohammad Hosein Mirza Heshmat-od-Dowleh, the oldest son of Mohammad-Ali Mirza Dowlatshah

== Death ==
In about 1855, Ali Mirza died in Karbala, Ottoman Empire.

== Sources ==
- Bamdad, Mehdi (1978). شرح حال رجال ایران در قرن ۱۲ و ۱۳ و ۱۴ هجری [Biographies of Iranian Elites in 17-20th Centuries] (in Persian). Zavvar.
- Khavari, Mirza Fazlollah Shirazi (1845). Tarikh Zol Qarnein (تاریخ ذوالقرنین) (in Persian). Ministry of Culture and Islamic Guidance of Iran.
- Rejaldb (26 June 2012). "علیشاه میرزا ظل السلطان" [Ali Shah Mirza Zel-os-Soltan]. rijaldb.com. Archived from the original on 14 July 2021.
