= Mahd-i Ulya =

Title of Queen mother

Mahd-i Ulyā or Mahd-e Olyā (Persian: مهد علیا, lit. 'Sublime Cradle' or 'Highest-ranked Cradle') was a common title for empress mother, mothers of shahs, or crown princes, in Iran during the Safavid and Qajar eras, and title of mothers of Ottoman sultans like valide sultan. This title was bestowed upon women who were powerful and of very high rank. It is also occasionally used in a similar context for the wife or the mother of a local ruler or a religious leader:

- Seljuk Shah Begum was Uzun Hasan's principal wife and the mother of Sultan Khalil and Yaqub Aq Qoyunlu
- Tajlu Khanum was the principal wife of Shah Ismail I and the mother of Shah Tahmasp
- Mahinbanu Sultan was the youngest daughter of Shah Ismail and the sister of Shah Tahmasp.
- Pari Khan Khanum was the daughter of Shah Tahmasp and the sister of Shah Ismail II and Shah Mohammad Khodabanda.
- Zeynab Begum was the daughter of Shah Tahmasp, the sister of Shah Ismail II and Shah Mohammad Khodabanda, and the aunt of Shah Abbas the Great and Shah Safi.
- Zubaidah Begum was the daughter of Shah Abbas the Great and the aunt of Shah Safi.
- Razia Begum Safavi was the daughter of Shah Sultan Husayn and the principal wife of Nader Shah.
- Jeeran Khanum was the mother of Agha Mohammad Khan.
- Asiye Khanum Ezzeddin Qajar, mother of Fath-Ali Shah Qajar
- Asiya Khanom Devellu was the principal wife of Fath-Ali Shah and the mother of Abbas Mirza.
- Naneh Khanom Barforoush, wife of Fath-Ali Shah Qajar
- Galin Khanom Devellu, mother of Mohammad Shah Qajar
- Malek Jahan Khanom, mother of Naser al-Din Shah Qajar
- Gawhar Shad, wife of Shah Rukh
- Khayr al-Nisa Begum, wife of Shah Mohammad Khodabanda and mother of Shah Abbas I
- Fatimih, wife of Bahá'u'lláh
- Sultanum Begum (c. 1516 – 1593), wife of Tahmasp I
- Safiye Sultan (c. 1550 – after 20 April 1619), mother of Sultan Mehmed III
- Mumtaz Mahal (c. 1593 – after 17 june 1631), wife of Emperor Shah Jahan
