= Mohammad-Qoli Mirza Molk-Ara =

Iranian prince (1789–1872)

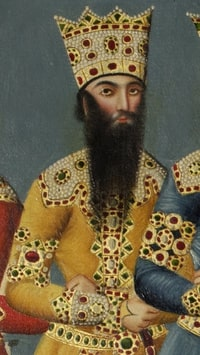
- Portrait of Mohammad-Qoli Mirza Molk-Ara (detail). From a mural in the Negarestan Palace, made by Abdallah Khan in 1816–1820

Governon of Mazandaran
- Tenure: 1801 – 1834
- Predecessor: Hossein Qoli Khan Qajar
- Successor: Farhad Mirza
- Born: 16 June 1789
- Died: 1872 (aged 82–83); Tehran, Qajar Iran
- Issue: Sam Mirza Shams ol-Sho'ara; Badi-oz Zaman Mirza; Abdol-Hossein Shams ol-Sho'ara
- Dynasty: Qajar dynasty
- Father: Fath-Ali Shah Qajar
- Mother: Assieh Khanum Qovanlu
- Religion: Twelver Shia Islam

Mohammad-Qoli Mirza Molk-Ara (Persian: محمدقلی میرزا ملک‌آرا; 1789–1872) was a Qajar prince and poet who governed Mazandaran province from 1801/02 to 1834. He was the third son of Fath-Ali Shah (r. 1797–1834).

== Biography ==
Born on 16 June 1789, Molk-Ara was the third son of Fath-Ali Shah Qajar (r. 1797–1834). His mother was Assieh Khanum Qovanlu. Molk-Ara had two full sisters and one maternal half-brother, Ebrahim Khan, who was born from Assieh Khanum's earlier marriage to Mehdi-Qoli Khan, the brother of Agha Mohammad Khan Qajar (r. 1794–1797).

In 1801/02, Molk-Ara was appointed as the governor of Mazandaran province. In 1813–1814, Astarabad was attacked by a 20,000-man Turkmen army under Yusuf Khoja Kashgari, who had earlier made a failed invasion of the Khorasan province, governed by Molk-Ara's brother Mohammad Vali Mirza. Yusuf Khoja Kashgari defeated Molk-Ara and his forces, but before he could advance further, was fatally shot in the chest by a member of the Gerayli tribe. His Turkmen forces subsequently scattered and withdrew. Mohammad Khan Qajar Ezz al-Din Lulu, the governor of Astarabad, rebelled soon afterwards, but was defeated and executed by government forces. The province of Astarabad was then incorporated into Mazandaran.

Following Fath-Ali Shah's death in 1834, a dynastic struggle ensued between the Qajar princes. His grandson Mohammad Shah Qajar ultimately became the new shah. Meanwhile, Molk-Ara, who was Fath-Ali Shah's oldest surviving at that time, lost his governorship to Fazel Ali Khan Qarabaghi and was summoned to Tehran by Mohammad Shah. During his time there, due to being the eldest son, Molk-Ara did not bow down to Mohammad Shah and would sit down without permission. As a result, Mohammad Shah eventually had him exiled to Hamadan.

At the end of his life, Molk-Ara was taken back to Tehran, where he died in 1872. Molk-Ara attempted to imitate his father, such as having a long beard and writing poetry, which he did under the pen name Khosravi.

== Family ==
Molk-Ara was the father of Badi-oz Zaman Mirza, who had governed Astarabad on his behalf; Sam Mirza Shams ol-Sho'ara, a court poet and ancestor of the Shams and Shams-e Molk Ara families; and Abdol-Hossein Shams ol-Sho'ara, the father of the politician Asadollah Mirza Shahab-od-Dowleh.

== Sources ==
- Bamdad, Mehdi (1968). شرح حال رجال ایران در قرن ۱۲ و ۱۳ و ۱۴ هجری [Dictionary of National Biography of Iran, 1700-1960, vol. 1].
- Bamdad, Mehdi (1971). شرح حال رجال ایران در قرن ۱۲ و ۱۳ و ۱۴ هجری [Dictionary of National Biography of Iran, 1700-1960, vol. 3].
- Eskandari-Qajar, Manoutchehr M. (2008). "The Message of the Negarestan Mural of Fath Ali Shah and His Sons: Snapshot of Court Protocol or Determinant of Dynastic Succession". L.A. Ferydoun Barjesteh van Waalwijk van Doorn (ed.), Qajar Studies: The Journal of the International Qajar Studies Association (IQSA). 8: 17–41.
- Katouzian, Homa (2013). Iran: Politics, History and Literature. Routledge. ISBN 978-0415636902.
