= Sheikh Ali Mirza =

Iranian prince (1796–1847)

- Prince
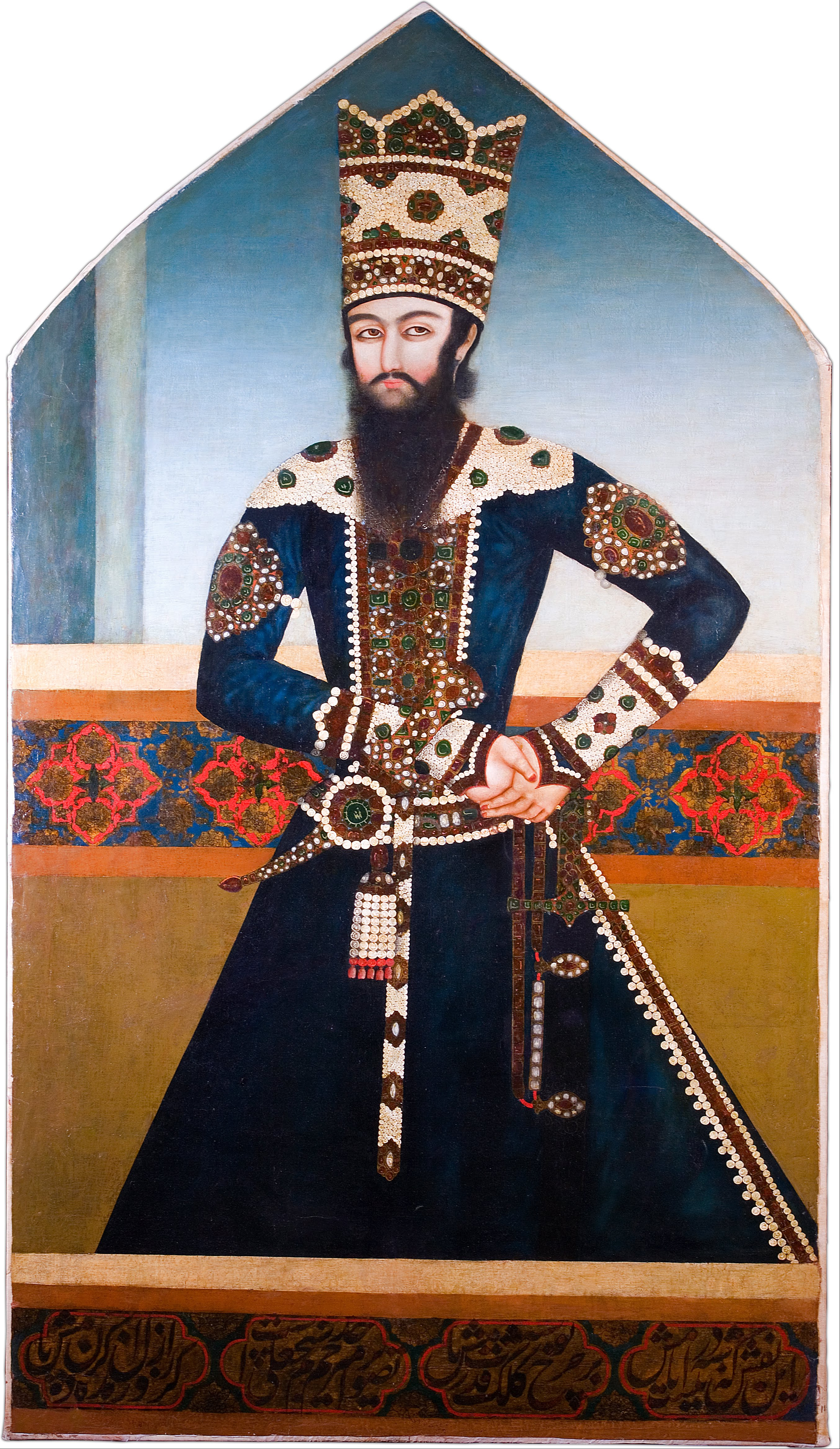
- Portrait of Sheikh Ali Mirza, made in the early 19th-century

Governor of Malayer and Tuyserkan
- Tenure: 1809–1835
- Born: 24 January 1796; Shiraz, Iran
- Died: 1847 (aged 51); Tabriz, Iran
- Dynasty: Qajar
- Father: Fath-Ali Shah Qajar
- Mother: Maryam Begom Zand
- Religion: Twelver Shia Islam

Sheikh Ali Mirza (Persian: شیخعلی میرزا; born 24 January 1796; died 1847), also known as Sheikh-ol-Molouk, was a Qajar prince, who governed the towns of Malayer and Tuyserkan from 1809 to 1835. He was the ninth son of Fath-Ali Shah (r. 1797–1834). His mother was Maryam Begum Zand, a daughter of Shaykh Ali Khan Zand.

== Early life ==
On 24 January 1796, Sheikh Ali Mirza, also known as Sheikh-ol-Molouk, was born in Shiraz, Qajar Iran. His father was Fath-Ali Shah Qajar (r. 1797–1834) and his mother was Maryam Begom Khanum, a daughter of Shaykh Ali Khan Zand who was a Zand commander.

== Final years ==
Following the death of Fath-Ali Shah, Sheikh Ali Mirza opposed the succession of his nephew Mohammad Shah Qajar to the Iranian throne, which led to his arrest in 1835. He was imprisoned in the fort of Ardabil for two years. Subsequently, he was sent to a prison in Tabriz where he spent another ten years until his death in 1847.

== Sources ==
- Bamdad, Mehdi (1972). شرح حال رجال ایران در قرن ۱۲ و ۱۳ و ۱۴ هجری [Biographies of [notable] personages of Iran in the 18th, 19th, and 20th centuries, vol. 2].
- Khavari, Mirza Fazlollah Shirazi (1845). Tarikh Zol Qarnein (تاریخ ذوالقرنین) (in Persian). Ministry of Culture and Islamic Guidance of Iran.
