= Mohammad Reza Mirza =

Iranian prince and poet

- Afsar

Governor of Gilan
- Tenure: 1819 – 1823/24
- Predecessor: Khosrow Khan Gorji
- Born: 1796
- Died: 1860 (aged 63–64)
- Dynasty: Qajar
- Father: Fath-Ali Shah Qajar

Mohammad Reza Mirza (Persian: محمدرضا میرزا; 1796–1860), also known by his epithet Afsar (افسر), was a Qajar prince and poet, who served as the governor of Gilan from 1819 to 1823/24. He was the thirteenth son of Fath-Ali Shah Qajar (r. 1797–1834), the shah (king) of Iran.

== Sources ==
- Shamsaddini, Payam (2019). "افسر". The Great Islamic Encyclopaedia (in Persian).
