= Fath-Ali Shah at the Hunt =

Painting by Mihr 'Ali

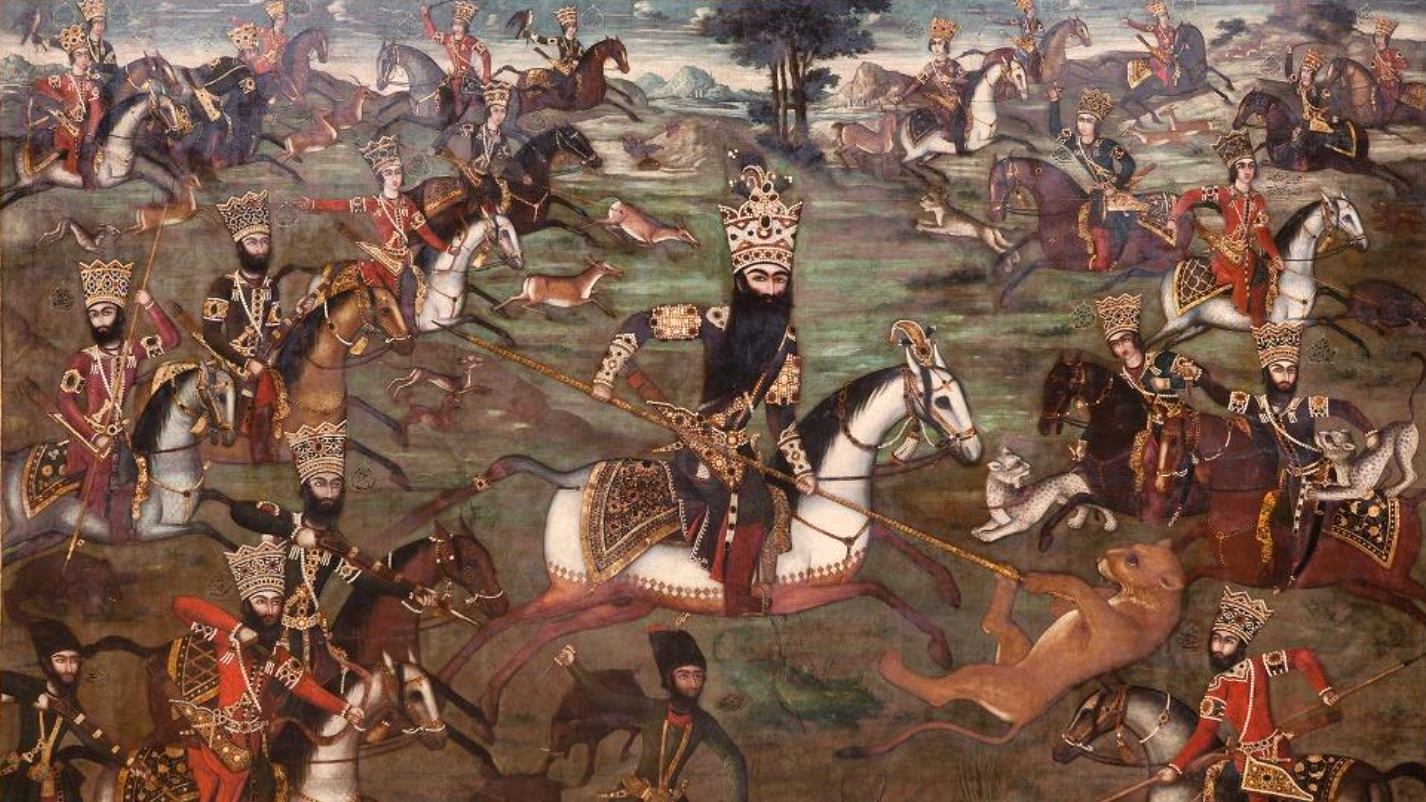
- Artist: Mihr 'Ali
- Year: c. 1810
- Medium: oil on canvas
- Dimensions: 355.6 cm × 520.7 cm (140 in × 205 in)
- Location: Ashok Hall, Rashtrapati Bhavan (previously Viceroy's House); New Delhi

Fath-Ali Shah at the Hunt is an oil on canvas (with lavish gilding) painting by Iranian artist Mihr 'Ali. Created in c. 1810 during the reign of Fath-Ali Shah Qajar (r. 1797–1834), it was presented as a royal gift to the British, and possibly arrived in England with Gore Ouseley (the British ambassador to Iran) in 1814. Typically for court Qajar art, the main subject of the painting is Fath-Ali Shah himself. It is currently located on the ceiling of the Ashok Hall in the Rashtrapati Bhavan (formerly the Viceroy's House) in New Delhi, India. It was in the India Office collection in London before being transferred to British India in 1929.

== Context ==
The painting was first discussed by B.W. Robinson in 1964. Robinson deemed the painting as constituting one of few extant examples of the monumental paintings of battle, enthronement and hunting that Fath-Ali Shah (r. 1797–1834) had originally commissioned. Robinson went on to say that it could be one of three paintings that the British diplomat Sir Gore Ouseley sent the Prince Regent in 1814 upon his return from Iran on behalf of Fath-Ali Shah. This possibility is shared by other more recent scholars such as Leila Diba and Talinn Grigor.

In the painting, Fath-Ali Shah is portrayed as the main subject and prominent figure of the composition while being mounted on a white horse. He is seen racing wildly through a lush plain. His horse appears to soar with its four legs in midair and his beard blows to the left as he charges, creating a powerful visual metaphor that is typical of court paintings from the early nineteenth century. Fath-Ali Shah deftly pierces a ferocious lion with a glittering spear while donning full court regalia, including the Kiani Crown and an aigrette topped with three black heron plumes. He also wears jeweled armbands, epaulettes, cuffs, a belt, a dagger, and a quiver. Twenty-two of his sons, each marked by a crown, are arranged in an elliptical pattern around him. The trip is accompanied by the two attendants in the front.

== Attribution ==
The landscape's design, the ruler's delicate features, and the ruler's elaborate décor all point to one of the three major court painters of the time, Mirza Baba, Abdallah Khan, or Mihr 'Ali. Whereas earlier scholarly works favored Mihr Ali over Abdallah Khan, they did not rule out Abdallah Khan as a possibility either. Modern-day scholarly works however assign the work to Mihr 'Ali.

== Relocation to New Delhi ==
Following Lord Irwin's request, William Foster recommended sending the work to the Viceroy's House (now the Rashtrapati Bhavan) in New Delhi. On 2 December 1929 it sailed on the SS Bangalore alongside four Chinese landscape paintings. Their safe arrival was noted in a letter from Lord Irwin one month later.
