= Asiya Khanom Devellu =

Wife of Fath-Ali Shah Qajar, mother of Abbas Mirza

Asiya Khanom Devellu آسیه‌خانم دوللو
- Mahd-e Olyā

Queen consort of Qajar Shah
- Tenure: before 1796–1814/15
- Died: 1814/15
- Burial: Al-Atabat Al-Aliyat
- Spouse: Fath-Ali Shah Qajar
- Issue: 3, including Abbas Mirza (son); Ali Mirza Zel as-Soltan (son); Gohar Malek Khanom (daughter)
- Father: Fath-Ali Khan Qajar Devellu

Asiya Khanom Devellu (d. 1814 or 1815) was one of the wives of Fath-Ali Shah Qajar and the mother of Abbas Mirza, the crown prince. She was the daughter of Fath-Ali Khan Qajar Devellu and the sister of Amir Khan Sardar, prominent figures in the Devellu branch of the Qajar tribe.

== Marriage ==
Asiya Khanom's marriage to Fath-Ali Shah was part of a political strategy initiated by Agha Mohammad Khan Qajar, aimed at reducing tensions between the two rival branches of the Qajar tribe, the Devellus and Qoyonlus. The plan was to name the son born from their marriage, Abbas Mirza, as the crown prince, thereby uniting both branches and ensuring the Devellu tribe wouldn't pose a threat to Fath-Ali Shah's reign.

After the birth of Ali Mirza Zel as-Soltan in 1795, Agha Mohammad Khan sent a highly valuable jewel known as the "Jeqeh-ye Almas Shakhedar Tokhmeh Lāl" (a diamond-studded ornament with a ruby seed) as a gift to Asiya Khanom, which was placed on Zel as-Soltan's cradle.

Asiya Khanom enjoyed a high status at court, being placed at the head of the Qajar harem's women during official ceremonies and receiving special respect from the Shah. This preferential treatment caused tension with other women in the harem, especially Badr al-Nessa Khanom, daughter of Mostafa Khan Qavanlou, who ultimately divorced the Shah in protest.

Known for her bravery and involvement in military matters, Asiya Khanom is said to have participated in several battles alongside her son Abbas Mirza, offering military advice and even giving commands. During official ceremonies, she would inspect the troops from the front.

Despite being the mother of the crown prince, Asiya Khanom died before receiving the title of "Mahd-e Olia". This title was later given to Naneh Khanom Barforoush, although her son never became the crown prince.

Asiya Khanom died in 1814 or 1815 (1230 AH) and was buried in Al-Atabat Al-Aliyat.

== Children ==
Children: Asiya Khanom had three children with Fath-Ali Shah:

- Abbas Mirza (Crown Prince)
- Ali Mirza Zel as-Soltan
- Gohar Malek Khanom (also known as Shah Bibi)
