= Naneh Khanom Barforoush =

Wife of Fath-Ali Shah Qajar

- Mahd-e Olyā
- Born: Sari
- Spouse: Fath-Ali Shah Qajar
- Dynasty: Qajar (by marriage)
- Father: Mohammad Khan Mazandarani Pazvari

Naneh Khanom Barforoush (Persian: ننه‌خانم بارفروش; born in Sari) also known as Mahd-i Ulya, was the sixtieth wife of Fath-Ali Shah Qajar, and she held a high status with him to the extent that she was granted the title of Mahd-i Ulya by him.

== Biography ==
She was the daughter of Mohammad Khan Mazandarani Pazvari and the sister of Molla Abdullah. She did not have close relationships with the other women of the court and spent most of her time with her husband. She had four children with Fath-Ali Shah. Although she was not the mother of the crown prince, she held the title of Mahd-i Ulya because Asiya Khanom Devellu, the mother of Abbas Mirza, died early and did not have the opportunity to hold the title. After Naneh Khanom, Ghalin Khanom, the wife of Abbas Mirza, inherited the title.

=== Children ===
Naneh Khanom had four children with Fath-Ali Shah Qajar, including:

- Kamran Mirza (1243–1263 AH)
- Orangzeb Mirza (1246–1284 AH)
- Khorram-Bahar Khanom – wife of Mirza Fath-Ali Khan
- Bazm-Ara Khanom – wife of Hassan Ali Khan Shahsavand

== Sources ==
- Soltani, Karim (1379). Titles of Qajar Era Men. Tehran: Ney. p. 184. ISBN 964-312-484-3
- Moezzi, Fatemeh (2008). "مهد علیاهای دوره قاجار" [Mahd-i Ulya's of Qajar Dynasty]. تاریخ معاصر ایران (Iranian Contemporay History Quarterly) (in Persian) (45): 157–182.
- "Harem of Fath-Ali Shah."; Nimrouz Magazine; September 4, 2019.
