= Qamar al-Saltaneh =

Iranian princess (19th century)

Mah Tabān Khanom
- Qamar al-Saltaneh
- Spouse: Mirza Hosein Khan Sepahsalar
- House: Qajar
- Father: Fath-Ali Shah Qajar
- Mother: Nush Afarin Khanom Zand

Mah Tabān Khanom (Persian: ماه تابان خانم), also known as Qamar al-Saltaneh (Persian: قمرالسلطنه), was the forty-sixth daughter of Fath-Ali Shah Qajar and the daughter of Nush Afarin Khanom Zand (1249–1308 AH).

She was a highly cultured and charitable woman beautiful, gracious, and dignified. Despite her great wealth, she lived simply and was not attached to worldly luxury or extravagance. Generosity was one of her most distinguished traits. Qamar al-Saltaneh was regarded as an intelligent, prudent, and capable woman in matters of state. Before making important decisions, her husband would seek her counsel and trusted her judgment and wisdom.

== Life ==
Mah Tabān Khanom, who bore the title Qamar al-Saltaneh, was the forty sixth daughter of Fath-Ali Shah Qajar, born to Nush Afarin Khanom Zand, and the wife of Mirza Hossein Khan Moshir al-Dowleh Sepahsalar. She was among the educated women of the Qajar court a poet, a philanthropist, a prudent figure, and a trusted adviser within the royal circle. Fluent in Turkish and familiar with French, she possessed remarkable intelligence and a strong understanding of political affairs. Her knowledge was so extensive that her husband would consult her before making state decisions and held her opinions in great respect. Her sister was named Mah Nush Khanom, who held the title Eftekhār al-Saltaneh. She was a gracious, kind, and courteous lady who showed great concern for those in need and had established stipends for underprivileged families.

In the book Khayrāt-e Hessān, it is written that in her youth, Mah Tabān Khanom was a learned and accomplished woman, adorned with noble virtues. She possessed a bright mind and remarkable intelligence, had thoroughly mastered Iranian arts and knowledge, and put into practice whatever she learned.

Each year, she allocated fifty thousand tomans from the income of her estates and properties to the decoration and restoration of the shrines of religious leaders. It is said that the reputable library of Sepahsalar School was established at her request, and she was the one who persistently urged her husband to set it up. She also showed great interest in social services, donating many of her estates in Hesar-e Khuban, Taleqan, Ghar, Fashapuyeh, Aliabad, and Nasrabad for the education of knowledge seekers and for charitable purposes.

She would sometimes host lively and grand gatherings, and at other times, she organized mourning ceremonies. In both cases, she provided food for the poor. Several respectable Sayyid families who were not financially well-off received stipends from her, allowing them to live more comfortably. During holidays, she gave gifts to everyone according to their means and circumstances.

She was strict and devoted in performing her religious duties; it is said that despite the hardships of the journey, she was determined to travel to Karbala and eventually completed the pilgrimage. She went on Hajj twice once at the age of 30 and again at 60.

Her house was always beautifully decorated and filled with colorful flowers. Once a year, Naser al-Din Shah would visit Qamar al-Saltaneh's home for lunch, accompanied by all the members of the Qajar harem. Knowing the Shah's fondness for jasmine flowers, Qamar al-Saltaneh would send him pots of Shirazi jasmine during the rose-harvesting season. Qamar al-Saltaneh herself visited the royal quarters several times each year, sometimes staying for one or two nights. She often went to see Anis al-Dowleh and would stay with her while in the palace. One Nowruz, Anis al-Dowleh was her guest and gifted Qamar al-Saltaneh the jewels that the Shah had given her as holiday presents.

Poems by Qamar al-Saltaneh are recorded in various biographical anthologies.
