= Sohrab Khan Gorji (Iranian treasurer) =

19th-century Iranian courtier and treasurer

Treasurer
- In office before 1829 – 1862
- Monarchs: Fath-Ali Shah Qajar; Mohammad Shah Qajar; Naser-ed-din Shah Qajar
- Preceded by: Khazeno-Dowleh

Chief of customs
- In office c.1850–1862
- Monarch: Naser-ed-din Shah
- Succeeded by: Vali Khan (Irakli Khan)

Personal details
- Born: c.1783 Georgia, Persia (unofficially autonomous Georgia)
- Died: April 1862 (aged 78–79) Tehran, Persia
- Children: Afrasiab Khan; Vali Khan (Irakli Khan); Mohammad-Ali Khan; Hosein Khan

Sohrab Khan Gorji (c.1783, 1862), also known by his nickname Naqdi, was a courtier, treasurer, and chief of customs in 19th-century Qajar Iran during the reign of Fath-Ali Shah, Mohammad Shah, and Naser-ed-din Shah. Sohrab was a Georgian Tavadi noble.

== Biography ==
Sohrab Khan had fought in the Russo-Iranian Wars and held several titles and positions, amongst which was tahvildar vojooh khaseh ("the treasurer") during the reign of Fath-Ali Shah Qajar (r. 1797–1834). He was tasked with managing the pocket money of king Naser-ed-din Shah (r. 1848–1896); thus, he received the nickname Naqdi ("the cash payer"). He was later appointed as the chief of Customs, and was also involved in buying land in relation to the vaqf system.

=== Russo-Persian War (1804) ===
In 1804, a few months after the Russian invasion of Persia, the Russian army under the command of Pavel Tsitsianov approached Persian Armenia, while running short of necessities such as food and equipment. Tsitsianov sent a division of his army including some brave Georgian Tavadi nobles, who were serving in the supply train unit (logistic support unit), together with some soldiers from the battlefield to Tbilisi to provide the necessities and bring them back to the battlefield. Meanwhile, the Persian army under the command of Abbas Mirza and his general of cavalry Mohammad Khan Khamsavi Afshar was expecting the Russian forces. A fight broke out between the two armies.

In August 1804, despite showing bravery and resistance in the battle, the Russian army division was defeated; its soldiers were killed; and the Tavadis were captured near Yerevan, Persian Armenia. Fath-Ali Shah himself was also present in the battlefield. Moreover, Prince Alexander of Georgia was also there and serving the Persian army as a commander.

=== The angelically handsome Georgian nobles ===
Khavari describes the Georgian Tavadi nobles as "angelically handsome". Eventually, the Tavadis were brought to Tehran by the shah’s army and arrived in Tehran on October 22, 1804. Due to their nobility and merit they were employed in the government. In a short period, they showed outstanding performance and were promoted to high ranks. Fath-Ali Shah selected the most notable ones to serve the shah directly while sending the rest to serve the commanders and generals of his army. Although Prince Alexander of Georgia was in the battlefield on the Persian side, it is unclear whether he played any role in recognizing his fellow Georgians that were captured and whether he made any recommendations about them to the Persians.

=== A Georgian noble to serve as the treasurer ===
The anthology of Sabouri states that Naqdi, i.e. the treasurer, was among the Georgians who were brought to Iran during the Russo-Persian wars at the time of Fath-Ali Shah, converted to Islam, and settled in Tehran. Sabouri was a Persian poet also known as "the king of poets" and the husband of one of Sohrab Khan’s descendants, in which both of them were the parents of the prominent Persian poet, also known as "the king of poets", Malek-o-Shoara Bahar.

A similar writing in the anthology of Tehranian narrates that Sohrab Khan Naqdi was among the Georgian elites that crown prince Abbas Mirza under the order of Fath-Ali Shah Qajar brought to Tehran together with other elite men as hostages. Due to his merit and skills, Sohrab Khan was appointed as the treasurer of Fath-Ali Shah Qajar and held that position until the end of his life. Tehranian was a Persian poet and a great-grandson of Sohrab Khan.

=== The treasurer of the king ===
In 1829, according to Khavari's report, Sohrab Khan was serving as the treasurer of Fath-Ali Shah and sent to Shiraz for preparation of the king's arrival.

On Sunday, November 22, 1829, Fath-Ali Shah, together with his entourage, departed from the capital, Tehran, to visit Shiraz. Two of Fath-Ali Shah's sons, Prince Hossein-Ali Mirza Farmanfarma and Prince Ali-Naqi Mirza, together with Sohrab Khan Gorji, the treasurer of Fath-Ali Shah, were sent to Shiraz to prepare for the arrival of the king. Fath-Ali Shah arrived in Shiraz on December 29 and was greeted with a large number of ordinary people, thunder-like gun salutes, scientists, dignitaries, noblemen, elites, and seniors.

=== A trustee to oversee the princes' wedding expenses ===
In 1834, Fath-Ali Shah's 39th son, Prince Seifo-Dowleh, was getting married; and his wedding ceremony was one of the largest in the country. Tajo-Dowleh, his mother, requested the Shah to appoint a trustee to oversee the finances of the ceremony. The Shah ordered Sohrab Khan Naqdi and Mehrab Khan Jensi to supervise the spending for the wedding. They estimated that 120,000 Toman worth of jewelry, luxurious clothing, gold, silver, and other precious items were provided. To which the Shah issued an order that 100,000 Toman for the prince's wedding is enough; the remaining 20,000 Toman should be spent for two other princes; and the wedding ceremony should be held for all three princes simultaneously.

=== A speech at the King's funeral ===
On September 5, 1848, the king of kings, Mohammad Shah Qajar (r. 1834–1848) died. Prominent courtiers prepared the throne and preserved the treasures and governing system until the arrival of the new king in the capital, Tehran. Meanwhile, Sohrab Khan attended the funeral of the late king and gave a speech while standing before Mohammad Shah's lifeless body.

=== The chief of customs ===
Sohrab Khan was the chief of customs during the reign of Naser-ed-din Shah (r. 1848–1896). He held this position until the end of his life.

=== A Letter from the premier ===
From 1848 to 1851, Naser-ed-din Shah's celebrated premier, Amir Kabir, sent numerous letters to the king. In one of these letters, Amir Kabir writes to Naser-ed-din Shah about customs and that he had requested from Sohrab Khan Gorji to send the report to the king.

=== Family ===
After Sohrab Khan settled in Tehran in 1804, he married twice and had four children.

His son Afrasiab was born from his first wife. Later, Afrasiab Khan left the court life and started his own business as an importer-exporter and merchant based in Saraye Hajeb-o-Dowleh in Tehran Grand Bazaar. Afrasiab was the grandfather and great-grandfather of the Persian poets, Tehranian and Bahar, respectively.

Sohrab Khan remained in Fath-Ali Shah's court and married the Shah's thirty-ninth daughter, Pasha Khanum. The wedding expenses were fully paid by Khazeno-Dowleh from the treasury. They had at least three sons; Vali Khan (also known as Irakli Khan), Mohammad-Ali Khan, and Hossein Khan.

==== Wives and Children ====
- First wife; children:
  - Afrasiab Khan (born: c. 1806); an importer-exporter and merchant based in Saraye Hajeb-o-Dowleh in Tehran Grand Bazaar; grandfather and great-grandfather of the Persian poets, Tehranian and Bahar, respectively;
- Second wife, Princess Pasha Khanum (born: c. 1806); 39th daughter of Fath-Ali Shah Qajar; children:
  - Vali (Irakli) Khan (born: c. 1824); the chief of customs during Naser-ed-din Shah’s reign
  - Mohammad Ali Khan (born: c. 1829)
  - Hossein Khan (born: c. 1847)

=== Death ===
In April 1862, Sohrab Khan died, and his son, Vali Khan (Irakli Khan), was appointed to Sohrab's position, i.e. chief of customs.

== Alternate names and titles ==
Sohrab's alternate names include: Zurab, Zorab, Zourab, and Zohrab; Georgian: ზურაბ; Persian: (سهراب), (زوراب)

Sohrab Khan's alternate titles include (in Persian):

- سهراب خان (سهرابخان)
- سهراب خان گرجی
- سهراب خان گرجی تحویلدار وجوه خاصه
- سهراب خان گرجی تحویلدار دربار صاحبقران
- سهراب خان گرجی تحویلدار صرف جیب
- سهراب خان نقدی
- سهراب خان گرجی خازن شهریار
- سهراب خان صندوقدار
