= Fath-Ali Shah Qajar =

Shah of Iran from 1797 to 1834

Fath-Ali Shah Qajar فتحعلی شاه قاجار
- King of Kings; Khan of Khans
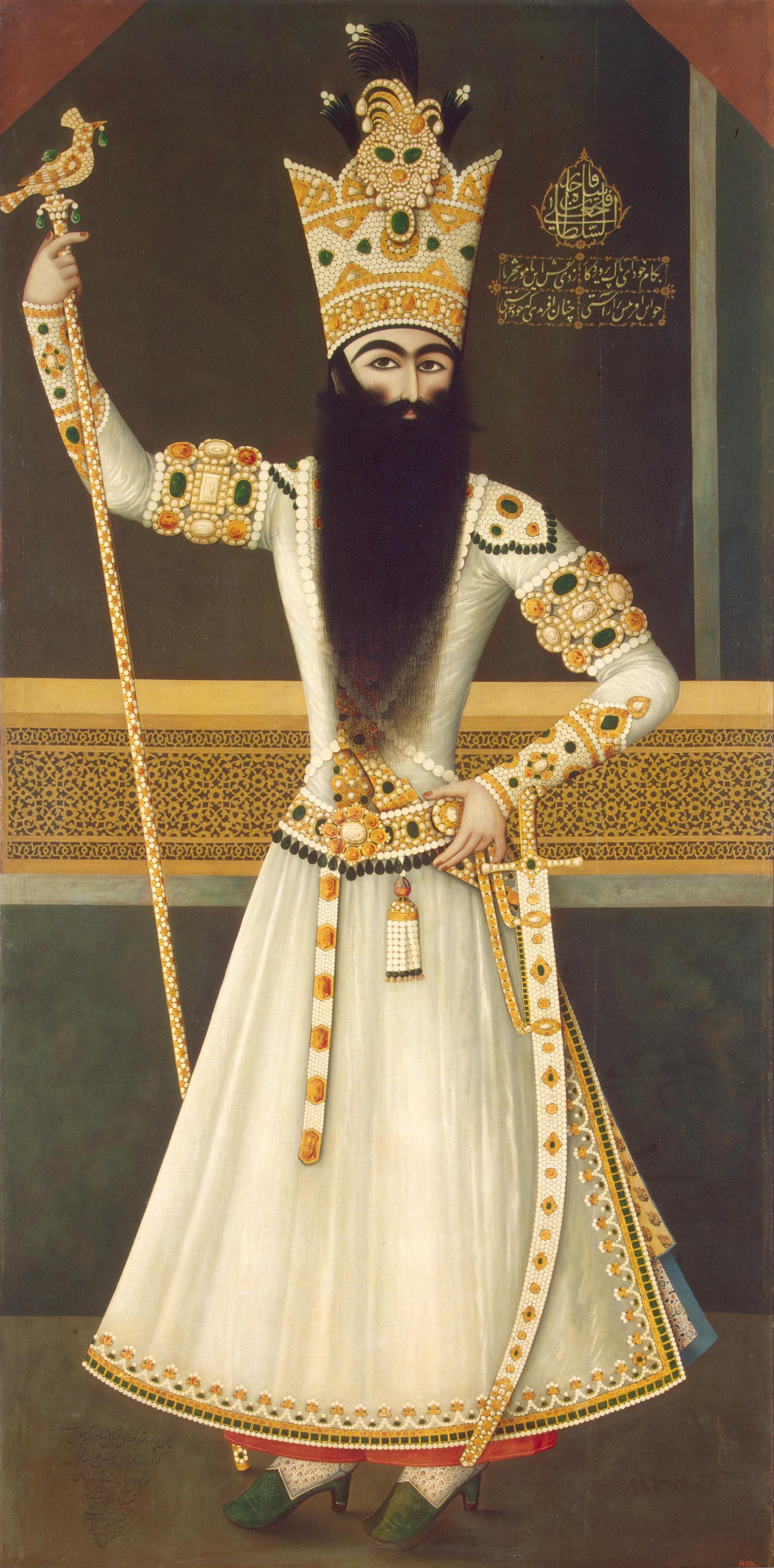
- Portrait by Mihr 'Ali, between 1809 and 1810 (Hermitage Museum)

Shah of Iran
- Reign: 17 June 1797 – 23 October 1834
- Coronation: 19 March 1798
- Predecessor: Agha Mohammad Khan Qajar
- Successor: Mohammad Shah Qajar
- Grand viziers: See list: Hajji Ebrahim Shirazi; Mirza Shafi Mazandarani; Hajji Mohammad Hossein Khan; Asef al-Dowleh
- Treasurers: See list: Mirza Reza Qoli Nava'i; Golbadan Baji; Sohrab Khan Gorji
- Born: 5 August 1772; Damghan, Zand Iran
- Died: 23 October 1834 (aged 62); Isfahan, Qajar Iran
- Burial: Fatima Masumeh Shrine
- Spouses: Badr Jahan Khanum; Ziba Chehar Khanum; Asiya Khanum Devellu; Maryam Khanum; Sonbol Baji Khanum; Tavus Khanum (Taj-od-Dowleh); Golbadan Baji Khanum (Khazen-od-Dowleh); More
- Issue Detail: Homayoon Soltan Khanum; Begum Jan Khanum; Mohammad Ali Mirza; Mohammad Qoli Mirza; Mohammad Vali Mirza; Abbas Mirza; Hossein Ali Mirza; Hasan Ali Mirza; More
Names
- Fath Ali Shah
- Dynasty: Qajar
- Father: Hossein Qoli Khan (biological); Agha Mohammad Khan Qajar (stepfather after 1779)
- Mother: Asiye Khanum Ezzeddin Qajar
- Religion: Shia Islam
- Tughra

Fath-Ali Shah Qajar (Persian: فتحعلى‌شاه قاجار, romanized: Fatḥ-ʻAli Šâh Qâjâr; 5 August 1772 – 24 October 1834) was the second Shah of Qajar Iran. He reigned from 17 June 1797 until his death on 24 October 1834. His reign saw the irrevocable ceding of Iran's northern territories in the Caucasus, comprising what is nowadays Georgia, Derbent, Azerbaijan, and Armenia, to the Russian Empire following the Russo-Persian Wars of 1804–1813 and 1826–1828 and the resulting treaties of Gulistan and Turkmenchay. These two treaties are closely tied to Fath-Ali Shah's legacy amongst Iranians, who often view him as a weak ruler.

Fath-Ali Shah successfully restructured a mostly Turkic tribal khanship into a centralized and stable monarchy based on the old imperial design. This brought to Iran a relatively calm and prosperous period, secured a mutually beneficial relationship between state and religion, established foundational principles of state administration, and supported cultural and artistic revival, which remained a distinctive feature of the Qajar dynasty. At the end of his reign, his mounting economic problems and declining military power took Iran to the verge of ruin. The situation was further complicated by the subsequent struggle for the throne that ensued after his death. Fath-Ali Shah had many portraits of himself and his court created, with the intention to aggrandize his rule. These included most notably the rock reliefs which were created next to those left by the pre-Islamic Sasanian Empire (224–651) in Ray, Fars and Kermanshah. This was done in an effort to portray himself as heir to the ancient Persian empire, not just to his fellow countrymen but to all of posterity. An inscription is located in Cheshmeh-Ali in Rey, near Tehran.

== Early life ==
He was born on 5 August 1772 in the city of Damghan, then under the governorship of his father. He was called Fath-Ali, a name borne by his prominent great-grandfather, Fath-Ali Khan Qajar. But he was mainly known by his second name of Baba Khan until his coronation in 1797. However, the Russians still called him Baba Khan until 1813, as they refused to recognize his rule. He was the eldest son of Hossein Qoli Khan Qajar (the brother of Agha Mohammad Khan Qajar) and the daughter of the Mohammad Agha Ezz al-Dinlu of the Ashaqa-bash branch of the Qajar tribe. Due to Hossein Qoli Khan being suspected of plotting to rebel against the Zand dynasty, Baba Khan (then aged five) was sent as a hostage to the court of the Zand ruler Karim Khan Zand (r. 1751–1779) in Shiraz. There, Baba Khan joined his uncle Agha Mohammad Khan, who was also a hostage at the court.

Baba Khan later returned to Damghan (according to the 19th-century Iranian writer Reza-Qoli Khan Hedayat, this took place in 1775), where he was witness to the conflict amongst the Davallu Qajar chiefs of Astarabad, which ultimately led to the murder of his father by the Kuklan Turkmens in 1777. Baba Khan sought shelter with his uncle Morteza Qoli Khan Qajar in the village of Anzan (near Astarabad), where he stayed for two years. Following the death of Karim Khan in 1779, Baba Khan shifted his allegiance to Agha Mohammad Khan, who had returned to Mazandaran and overpowered Morteza Qoli and two other brothers in Barforush. Although Agha Mohammad Khan had been castrated at a young age, he married Baba Khan's mother in Sari and practically became his stepfather and guardian.

In 1780, Baba Khan and Agha Mohammad Khan were captured in Baforush by the latter's brother Rezaqoli Khan Qajar, who was displeased with the favour that Baba Khan received from Agha Mohammad Khan. They were eventually released, and in 1781 Baba Khan seized Damghan from Qader Khan Arab Bestami, thus recovering his father's former domain. Baba Khan also captured and married Qader Khan's daughter Badr Jahan. In 1783, Baba Khan married his first Qajar wife, Asiya Khanom Devellu in Sari. The marriage was a political union organized by Agha Mohammad Khan to make peace with the Yokhari-bash branch of the Qajars, the clan of Asiya Khanom. Following Agha Mohammad Khan's accession to the throne at Tehran on 21 March 1786, Baba Khan was designated as his heir and vice-regent.

Baba Khan took part in his uncle's war with the Zands in southern Iran, where he in 1787 narrowly succeeded in defeating the governor of Yazd, Mohammad-Taqi Bafqi, who acknowledged Qajar suzerainty. Baba Khan then went to Gilan to protect it against Qajar chiefs whose loyalty was questionable.

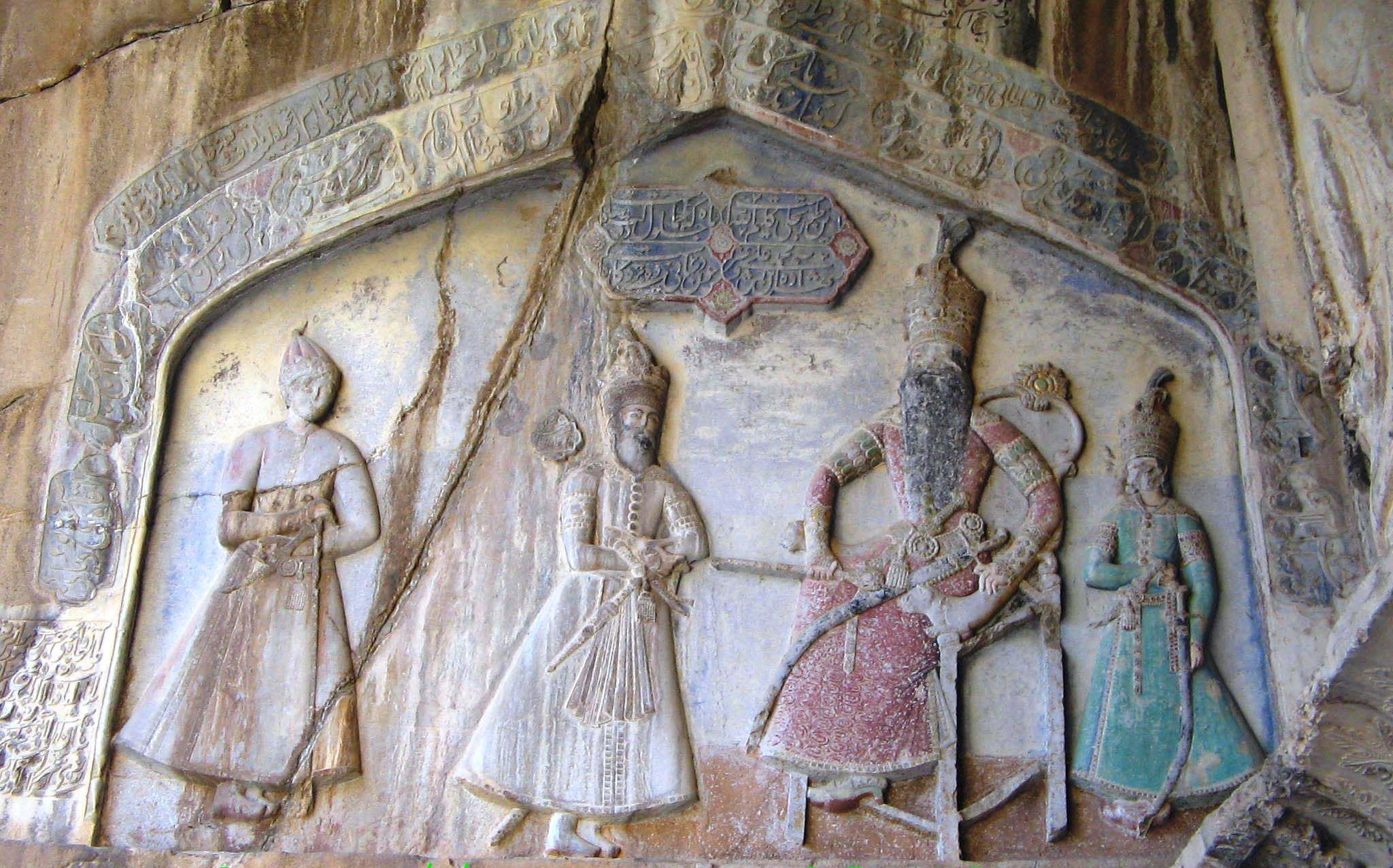
Fath Ali Shah's relief added to the Taq-e Bostan ancient complex in the 19th century.

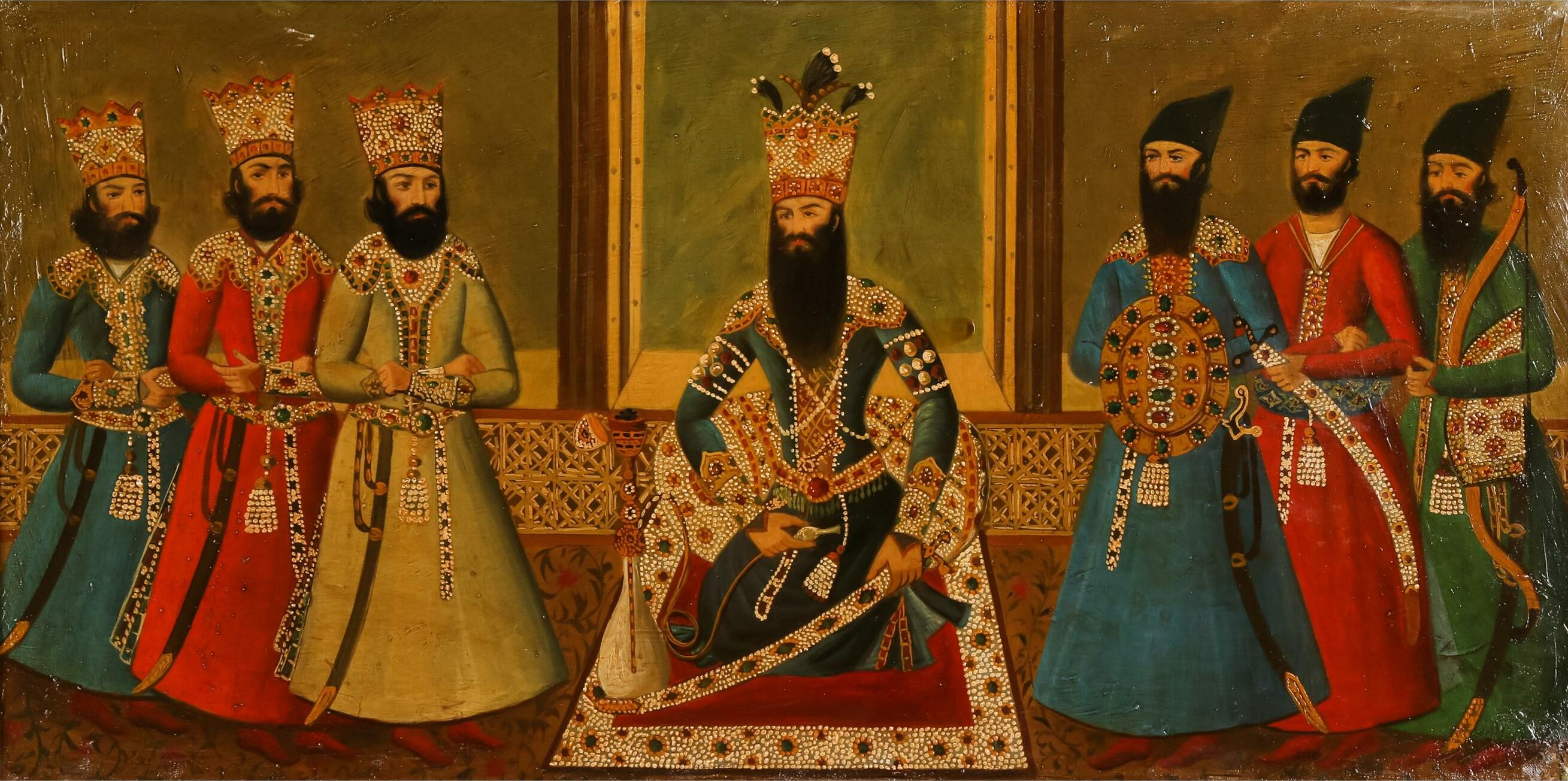
Fath 'Ali Shah, in full regalia, seated on a bejewelled floor spread in the middle of a courtly interior, flanked by his sons and advisors standing on his sides, the subject and composition echoing 19th-century Qajar oil paintings.

Baba Khan was governor of Fars when his uncle was assassinated in 1797. Baba Khan then ascended the throne and used the name of Fath Ali Shah (with the word "shah" added to his name). He became suspicious of his chancellor Ebrahim Khan Kalantar and ordered his execution. Hajji Ebrahim Khan had been chancellor to Zand and Qajar rulers for some fifteen years. Much of his reign was marked by the resurgence of Persian arts and painting, as well as a deeply elaborate court culture with extremely rigid etiquette. In particular, during his reign, portraiture and large-scale oil painting reached a height previously unknown under any other Islamic dynasty, largely due to his personal patronage.

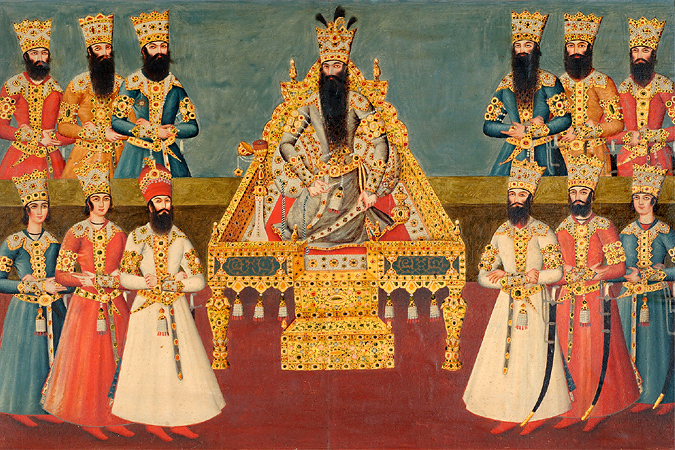
Fath 'Ali Shah enthroned on the Sun Throne with his twelve senior sons. At the shah's left-hand side, upper row, third person is Mohammad Taqi Mirza.

Fath Ali also ordered the creation of much royal regalia, including coronation chairs; the "Takht-e Khurshīd" or Sun Throne; the "Takht-e Nāderi" or Naderi Throne, which was also used by later kings; and the "Tāj-e Kiyāni" or Kiani Crown, a modification of the crown of the same name created by his uncle Agha Mohammad Khan. The latter, like most of his regalia, was studded with a large number of pearls and gems.

In 1797, Fath Ali was given a complete set of the Britannica's 3rd edition, which he read completely; after this feat, he extended his royal title to include "Most Formidable Lord and Master of the Encyclopædia Britannica." In 1803, Fath-Ali Shah appointed his cousin Ebrahim Khan as the governor of the Kerman province, which had been devastated during the reign of Agha Mohammad Khan.

In Khorasan, there would be a growing revolt led by Nader Mirza, who would restore the Afsharid dynasty. The Shah's control was so limited in fact that an 1800–1801 tax register listed only Sabzevar and Neyshabur as paying taxes to the government, while the rest of the local Khorasani leaders paid no taxes to the state at all.

== Coronation ==
On 28 July 1797, Baba Khan ascended the throne of Iran in Shiraz. He ordered minting coins in Shiraz and Tehran initially as Soltan Baba Khan and later as Fath-Ali Shah. Minting coins under the shah's name, which was a precedent away from traditional coins minted with a Shia Imam's name, signified his hold to full sovereignty. His official coronation ceremony was held in Tehran on 19 March 1798, in which three celebration days were coincided, i.e., Nowruz, Fitr, and the shah's coronation. Ebrahim Khan served as his grand minister (grand vizier) with nearly full authority over the army and administration.

== Russo-Persian Wars (1804–1828) ==
=== Russo-Persian War (1804–1813) ===
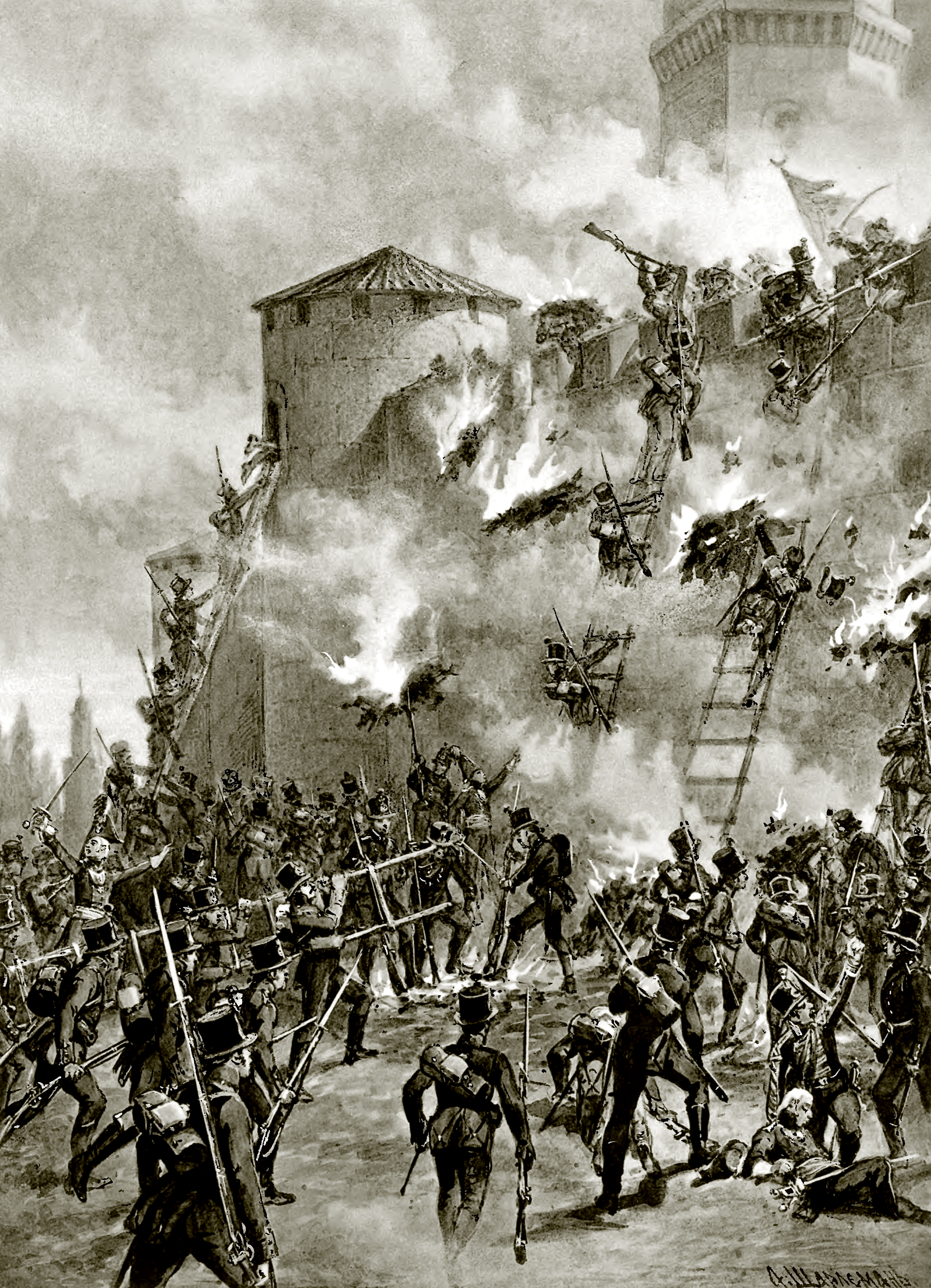
The siege of Ganja Fortress in 1804 during the Russo-Persian War (1804–1813) by the Russian forces under the leadership of General Pavel Tsitsianov.

War flag of Fath Ali Shah

During the early reign of Fath Ali Shah, Imperial Russia took control of Georgia, a territory which Iran had ruled intermittently since 1555 with the Peace of Amasya. Georgia, led by Heraclius II, had forged an alliance with Iran's rival, Russia, following the Treaty of Georgievsk. To punish his Georgian subjects, his uncle, Agha Mohammad Khan, had invaded and sacked Tbilisi, seeking to reestablish full Iranian suzerainty over Georgia, in which he succeeded. Even though the Russian garrisons in the city had to retreat, Iran did not manage to put back all of its needed garrisons over the country as Agha Mohammad Khan was assassinated soon afterwards in Shusha, following with Russia's act of annexation of those previously-Iranian ruled parts of Georgia in 1801, after many Georgian embassies and a treaty. Also, not only was Georgia annexed, but Dagestan was also invaded, which had also been under Iranian rule since the early Safavid era. As it was seen as a direct intrusion into Iranian territory, Fath Ali Shah, determined to reassert Iranian hegemony over the whole region, declared war on Russia after General Pavel Tsitsianov attacked and stormed the city of Ganja, massacring many of its inhabitants and forcing many thousands to flee deeper within the Iranian domains. In 1804, Fath Ali Shah ordered the invasion of Georgia in order to regain it, under pressure from the Shia clergy, who were urging a war against Russia. The war began with notable victories for the Iranians, but Russia shipped in advanced weaponry and cannons that disadvantaged the technologically inferior Qajar forces, who did not have the artillery to match. Russia continued with a major campaign against Iran; Iran asked for help from Britain on the grounds of a military agreement with that country (the military agreement was signed after the rise of Napoleon in France). However, Britain refused to assist Iran, claiming that the military agreement concerned a French attack, not a Russian one.

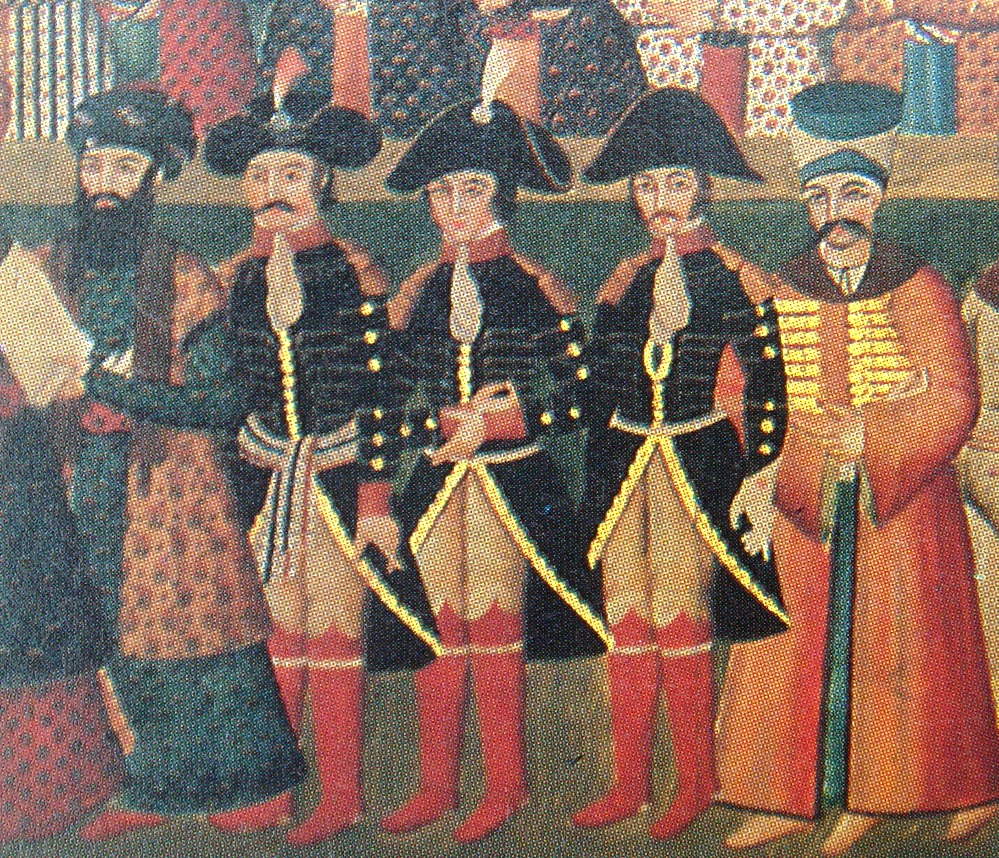
General Gardane, with colleagues Jaubert and Joanin, at the court of Fath-Ali Shah in 1808.

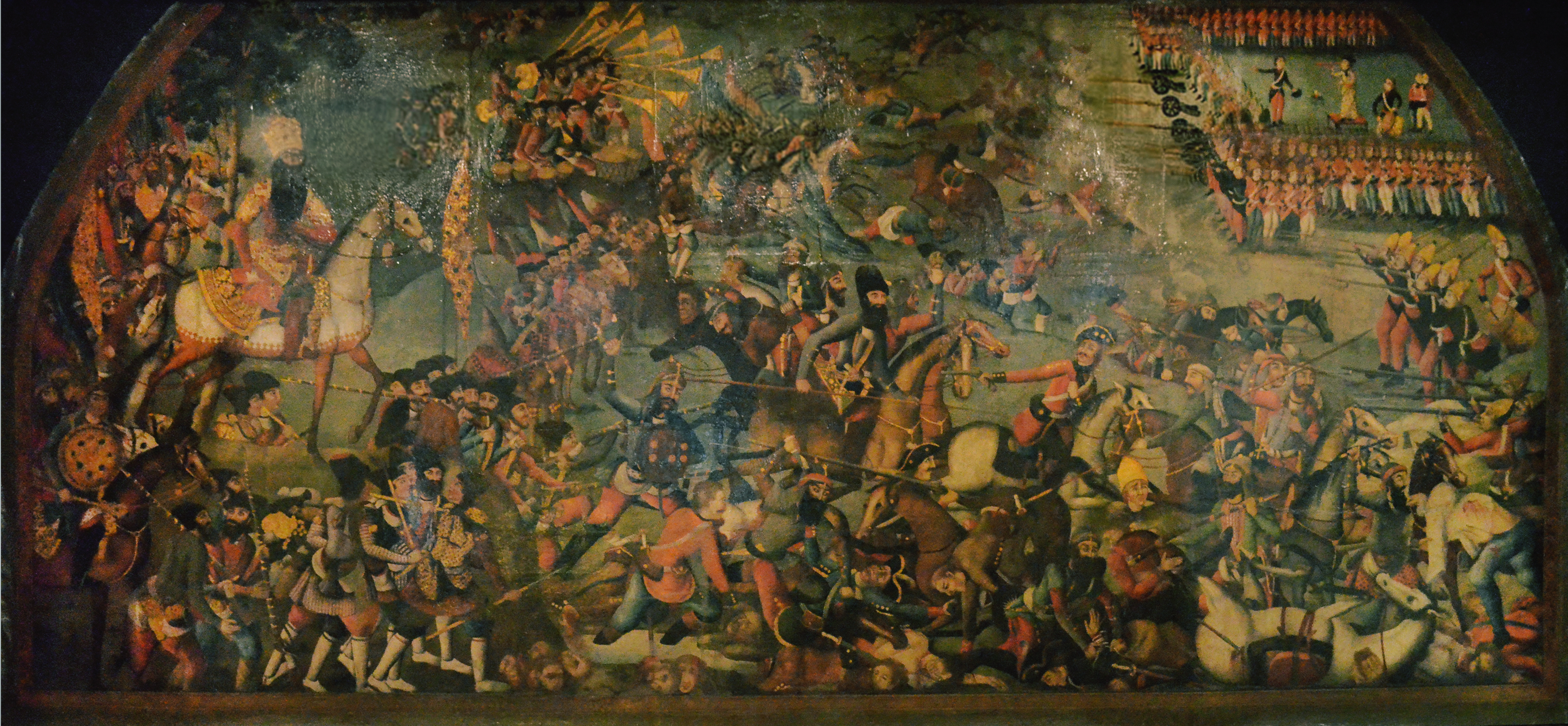
Mirza Baba's depiction of Fath Ali Shah's victory over the Russians at Yerevan (National Museum of Iran)

Iran had to ask for help from France, sending an ambassador to Napoleon and concluding a Franco-Persian alliance with the signature of the Treaty of Finkenstein. However, just when the French were ready to help Iran, Napoleon made peace with Russia. At this time, John Malcolm arrived in Iran and promised support, but Britain later changed its mind and asked Iran to retreat. Though the war had been stale for many years and was located in various parts of Transcaucasia, the peace with Napoleon enabled the Russians to increase their war efforts in the Caucasus against Iran. In early 1813, under General Pyotr Kotlyarevsky, the Russians successfully stormed Lankaran. Russian troops invaded Tabriz in 1813, and Iran was forced to sign the Treaty of Gulistan with Russia.

==== Siege of Erivan ====
After the siege of Ganja, the Russians under Pavel Tsitsianov proceeded to Erivan, besieging it. The Iranian forces inside Erivan's citadel prevented the Russians from making a direct attack, while those outside the citadel surrounded the Russians and cut the invaders' supply lines. Commanded by Fath Ali Shah and Abbas Mirza, the Iranians successfully defended the city and defeated the Russian attack.

==== Treaty of Gulistan ====
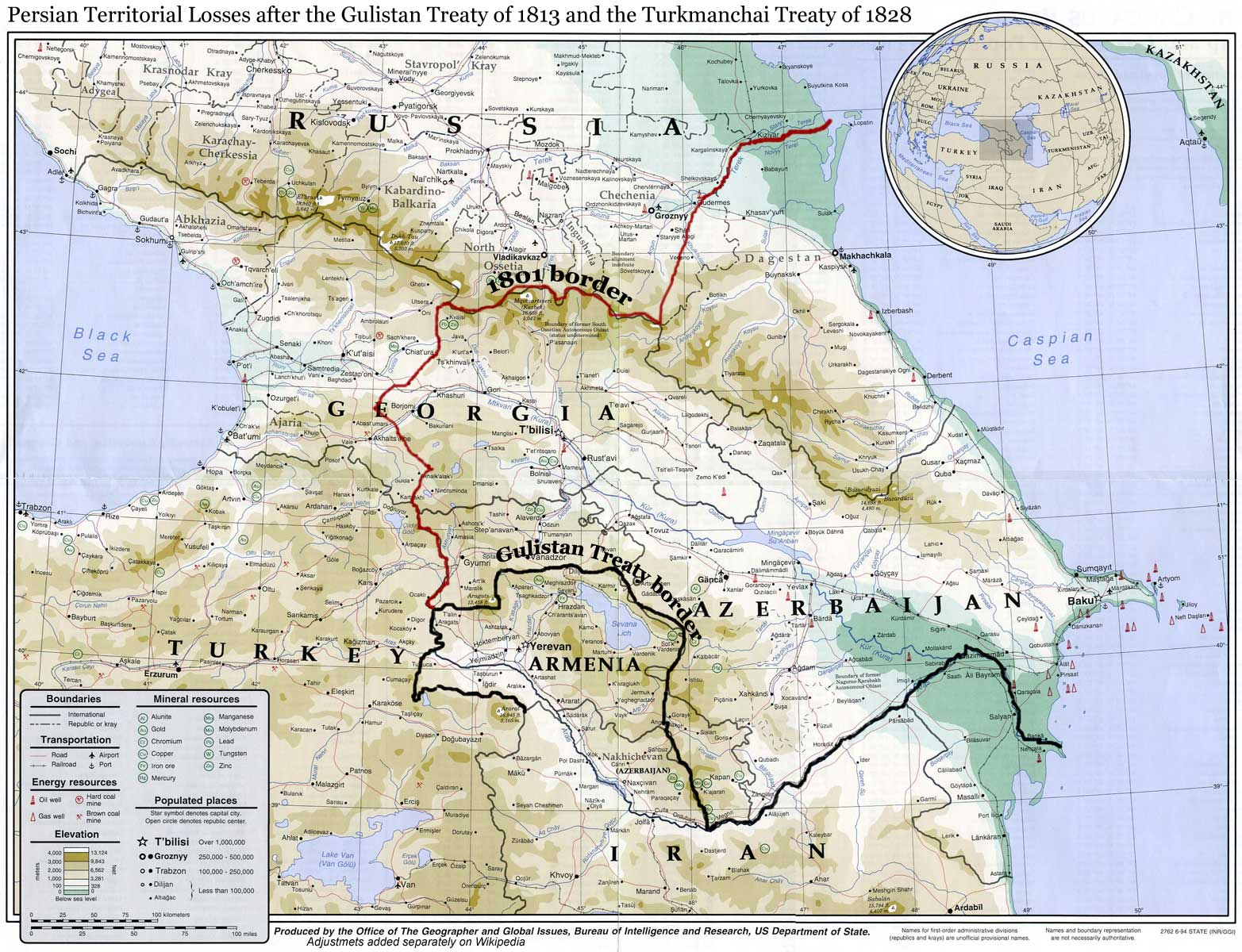
Map showing Iran's northwestern borders in the 19th century, comprising Eastern Georgia, Dagestan, Armenia, and Azerbaijan, before being forced to cede the territories to Imperial Russia per the two Russo-Persian Wars of the 19th century.

On account of consecutive defeats of Iran and after the fall of Lankaran on 1 January 1813, Fath Ali Shah was forced to sign the disastrous Treaty of Gulistan. The text of the treaty was prepared by a British diplomat, Sir Gore Ouseley, and was signed by Nikolay Rtishchev from the Russian side and Mirza Abolhassan Khan Ilchi from the Iranian side on 24 October 1813 in the village of Gulistan.

By this treaty all of the cities, towns, and villages of Georgia, villages and towns on the coast of the Black Sea, all of the cities, towns and villages of the Khanates in the South Caucasus and North Caucasus, and part of the Talysh Khanate, including Megrelia, Abkhazia, Imeretia, Guria, Baku khanate, Shirvan Khanate, Derbent, Karabakh khanate, Ganja khanate, Shaki Khanate and Quba Khanate became part of Russia. These territories altogether comprise modern-day Georgia, southern Dagestan, and most of the contemporary Azerbaijan Republic. In return, Russia pledged to support Abbas Mirza as heir to the Iranian throne after the death of Fath Ali Shah.

=== Interlude on a different front ===
Between 1805 and 1816, Qajar rulers began invading Herat in neighboring Afghanistan with small detachments. The Iranians were attempting to retake control of the city but were forced to abandon it due to Afghan uprisings. In 1818 the Shah sent his son Mohammad Vali Mirza to capture the city but he was defeated at the Battle of Kafir Qala.

=== Russo-Persian War (1826–1828) ===
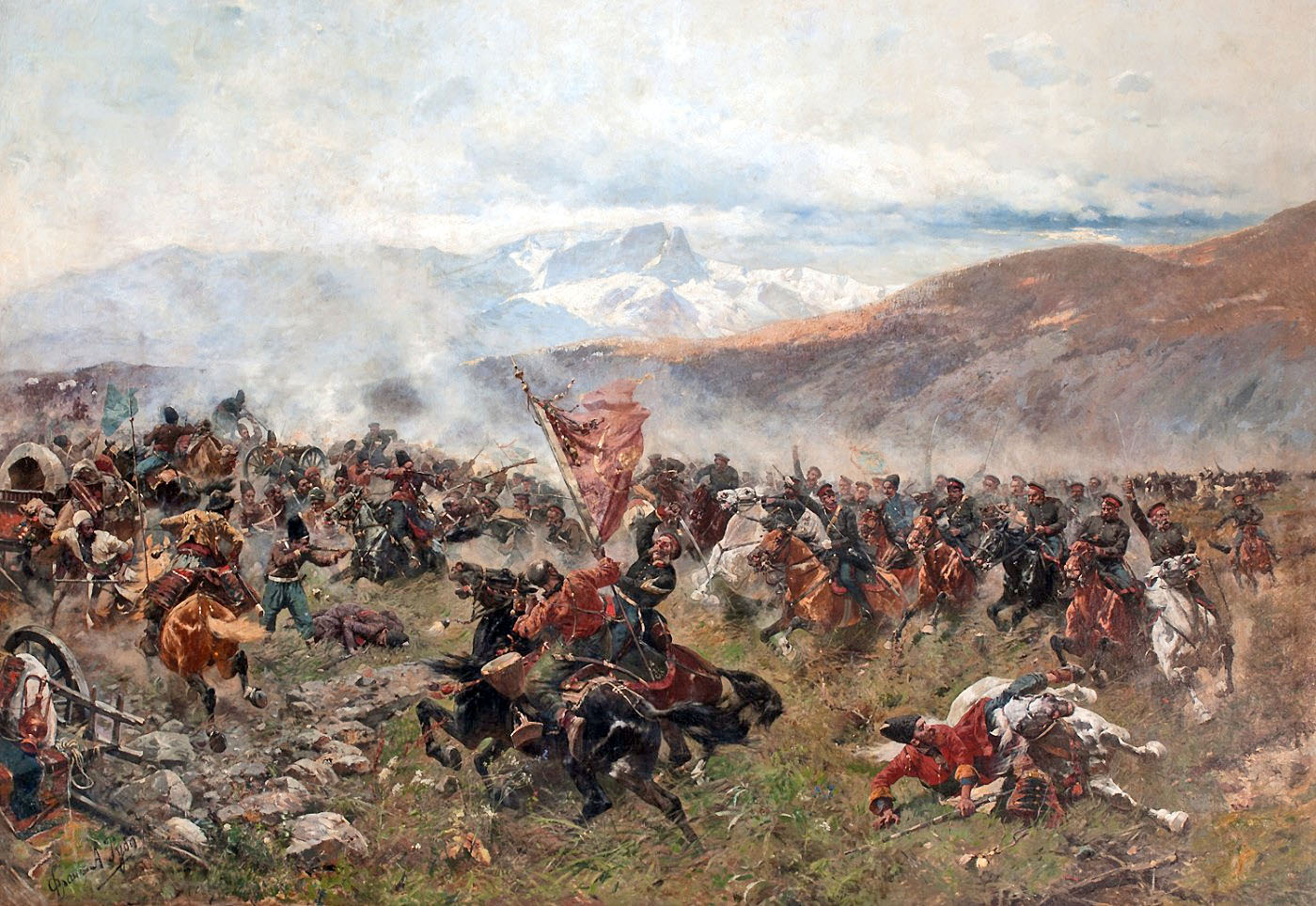
Battle of Ganja, 1826, Franz Roubaud. Part of the collection of the Museum for History, Baku.

In 1826, 13 years after the Treaty of Gulistan, the Shah, on the advice of British agents and the utter dissatisfaction with the outcome of the previous war, decided to occupy the lost territories. Crown prince Abbas Mirza, head of the armies, invaded the Talysh Khanate and Karabakh khanate with an army of 35,000 on 16 July 1826. The first year of the war was very successful, and the Iranians managed to regain most of their lost territories of the 1804–1813 war, including the principal cities of Lenkoran, Quba, and Baku. However, the tide turned after the winter. In May 1827, Ivan Paskevich, Governor of Caucasus, invaded Echmiadzin, Nakhichevan, Abbasabad and on 1 October he captured of Erivan. Fourteen days later, General Georgiy Eristov entered Tabriz. In January 1828, when the Russians reached the shores of Lake Urmia, Abbas Mirza urgently signed the Treaty of Turkmenchay on 2 February 1828.

==== Treaty of Turkmenchay ====
The Turkmenchay Treaty was signed on 21 February 1828 by Hajji Mirza Abol Hasan Khan and General Ivan Paskevich. By this treaty the Erivan khanate (most of present-day Armenia, and also a small part of Eastern Anatolia), Nakhchivan khanate (most of the present-day Nakhchivan Autonomous Republic of Azerbaijan), the Talysh Khanate (southeastern Azerbaijan), and the Ordubad and Mughan came under the rule of Imperial Russia. By this treaty, Iran had lost most of its Caucasian territories, comprising all of Transcaucasia and Derbent to neighboring Imperial Russia. Iran furthermore pledged to pay Russia 10 million in Gold, and in return, Russia pledged to support Abbas Mirza as heir to the Iranian throne after the death of Fath Ali Shah. The treaty also stipulated the resettlement of Armenians from Iran to the Caucasus, which also included an outright liberation of Armenian captives who were brought and had lived in Iran since 1804 or as far back as 1795.

== Later life ==
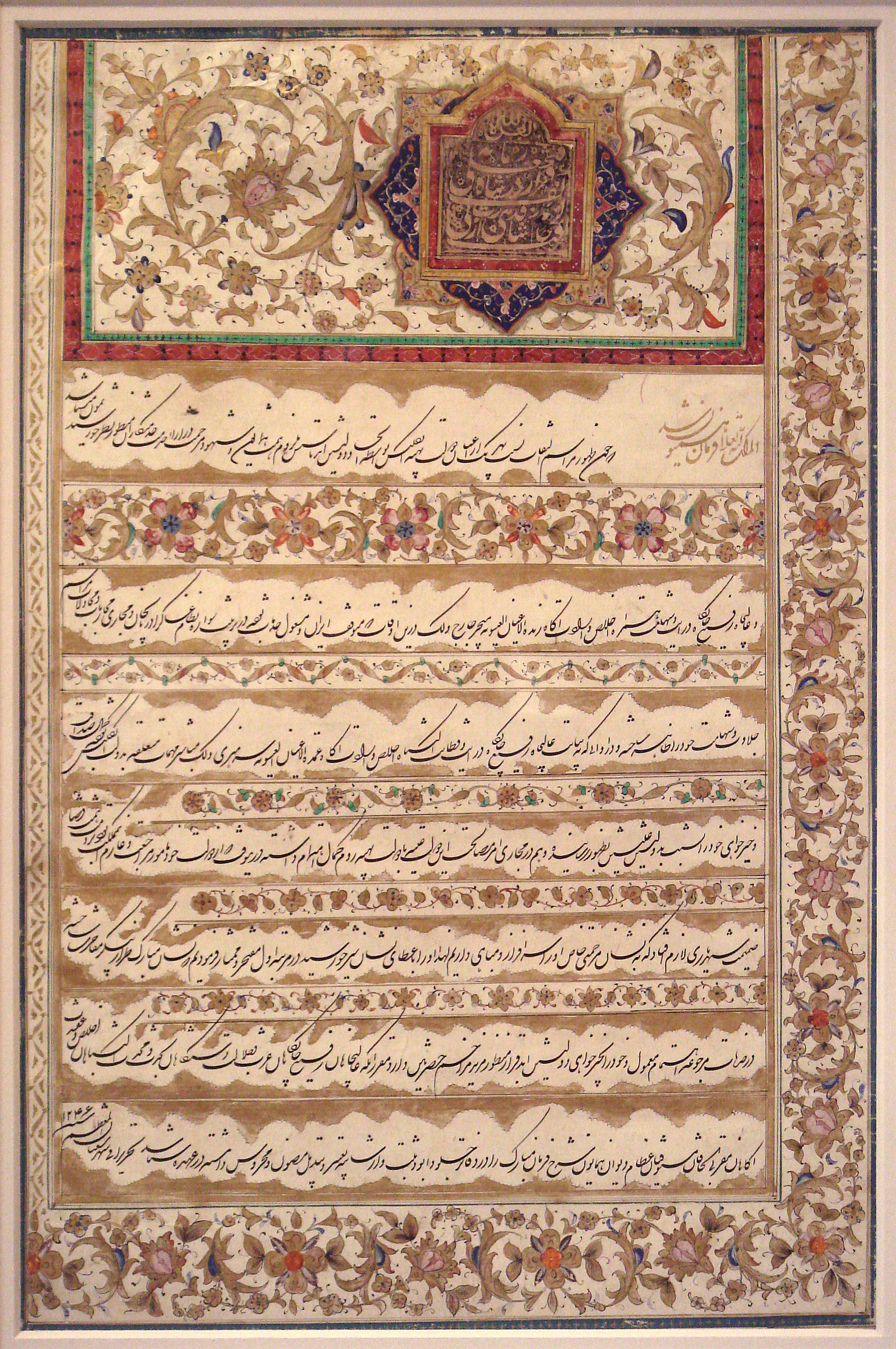
Fath Ali Shah Qajar's firman in Shikasta Nastaʿlīq script, January 1831.

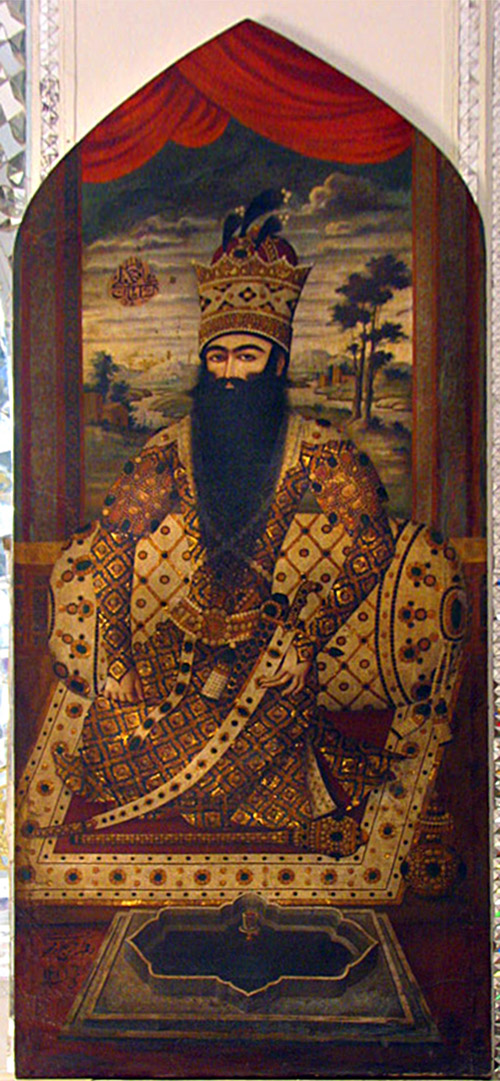
Fath Ali Shah Qajar with his Kiani crown, and the Royal Mace of Iran at his knees, painted by Mihr Ali

Fath Ali later hired painters like Mohammad Hasan Afshar, writers and calligraphers such as Fath-Ali Khan Saba to make the Shahanshahnama, a book about his reign and wars with Russia that was commissioned between 1806 and 1810, inspired by the Shahnameh of Ferdowsi, it is widely regarded as the most important Persian book written during the Qajar period.

In 1829, Alexander Griboyedov, the Russian diplomat and playwright was killed in the Massacre at the Russian Embassy in Tehran. To apologize, the Shah sent Prince Khosrow Mirza to Tsar Nicholas I to deliver a formal apology, as well as one of the biggest diamonds of his crown jewelry, namely the Shah Diamond.

When his favourite son and crown prince Abbas Mirza died on 25 October 1833, Fath Ali named his grandson Mohammed Mirza as his crown prince. Fath Ali died a year later, on 23 October 1834. He was buried in a tomb in the Fatima Masumeh Shrine of Qom.

He is instantly recognizable in all 25 known portraits – mainly due to his immense, deeply black beard, which reached well beneath his narrow waist. One of these portraits is being exhibited in the collection of the University of Oxford. Another one, by the artist, Mihr Ali, is at the Brooklyn Museum.

Besides eulogistic chronicles, the only real sources that allow us to judge his personality are those of British, French, and Russian diplomats. These vary greatly: earlier in his reign, they tend to portray him as vigorous, manly, and highly intelligent. Later, they begin to point out his extreme indolence and avarice. The image of decadence was epitomised by the story that he had a special harem slide of marble constructed. Every day, he would lie on his back naked "as, one by one, naked harem beauties swooped down a slide, specially made for the sport, into the arms of their lord and master before being playfully dunked in a pool."

== Titles ==
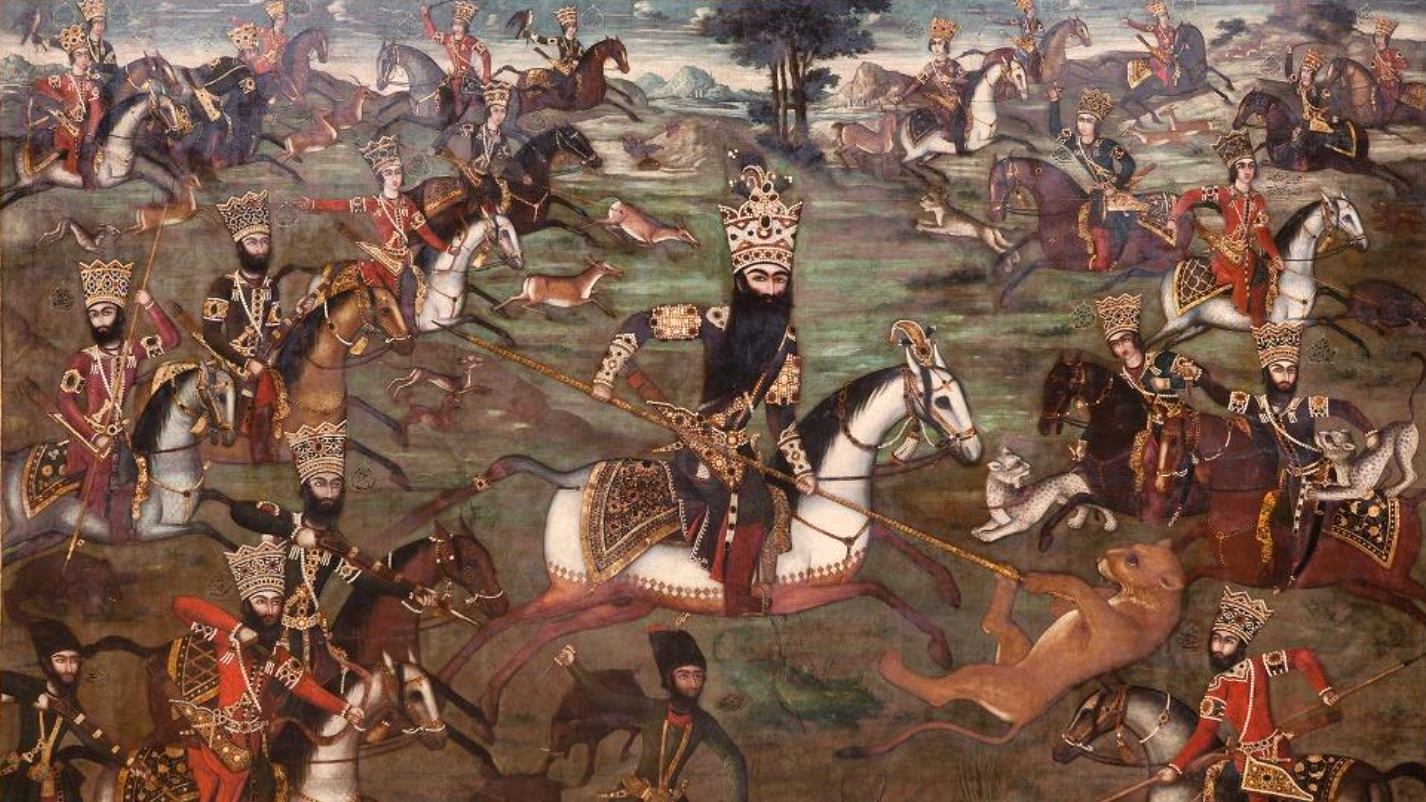
Fath-Ali Shah at the Hunt. Gift from Fath Ali Shah to King George IV of the United Kingdom, now in the Rashtrapati Bhavan Presidential Palace, New Delhi, India.

Fath-Ali Shah used both the ancient Persian title of shahanshah (King of Kings), i.e., Emperor, and the Turco-Mongol title of khaqan (khan of khans), thus representing himself as both ruler of the country and the tribes.

== Appearance ==
Fath-Ali Shah was the last Qajar shah to dress in the traditional manner, which included a decorated Persian long robe (qaba), crown, high heels, and a long beard. The Scottish statesman and historian John Malcolm, who met Fath-Ali Shah in 1800, described him as "above the middle size, his age little more than thirty, his complexion rather fair, his features regular and fine, with an expression denoting quickness and intelligence." In a portrait from The David Collection dated 1811, Fath-Ali Shah is holding a jeweled sceptre, in his left hand, while his right hand rests on the hilt of a sword or a Persian jambiya dagger tucked into his belt.

== Legacy ==
During his reign, Fath-Ali Shah successfully restructured a mostly Turkic tribal khanship into a centralized and stable monarchy based on the old imperial design. This brought to Iran a relatively calm and prosperous period, secured a mutually beneficial relationship between state and religion, established the foundational principles of state administration, and supported cultural and artistic revival, which remained a distinctive feature of the Qajar dynasty.

== Marriage and children ==
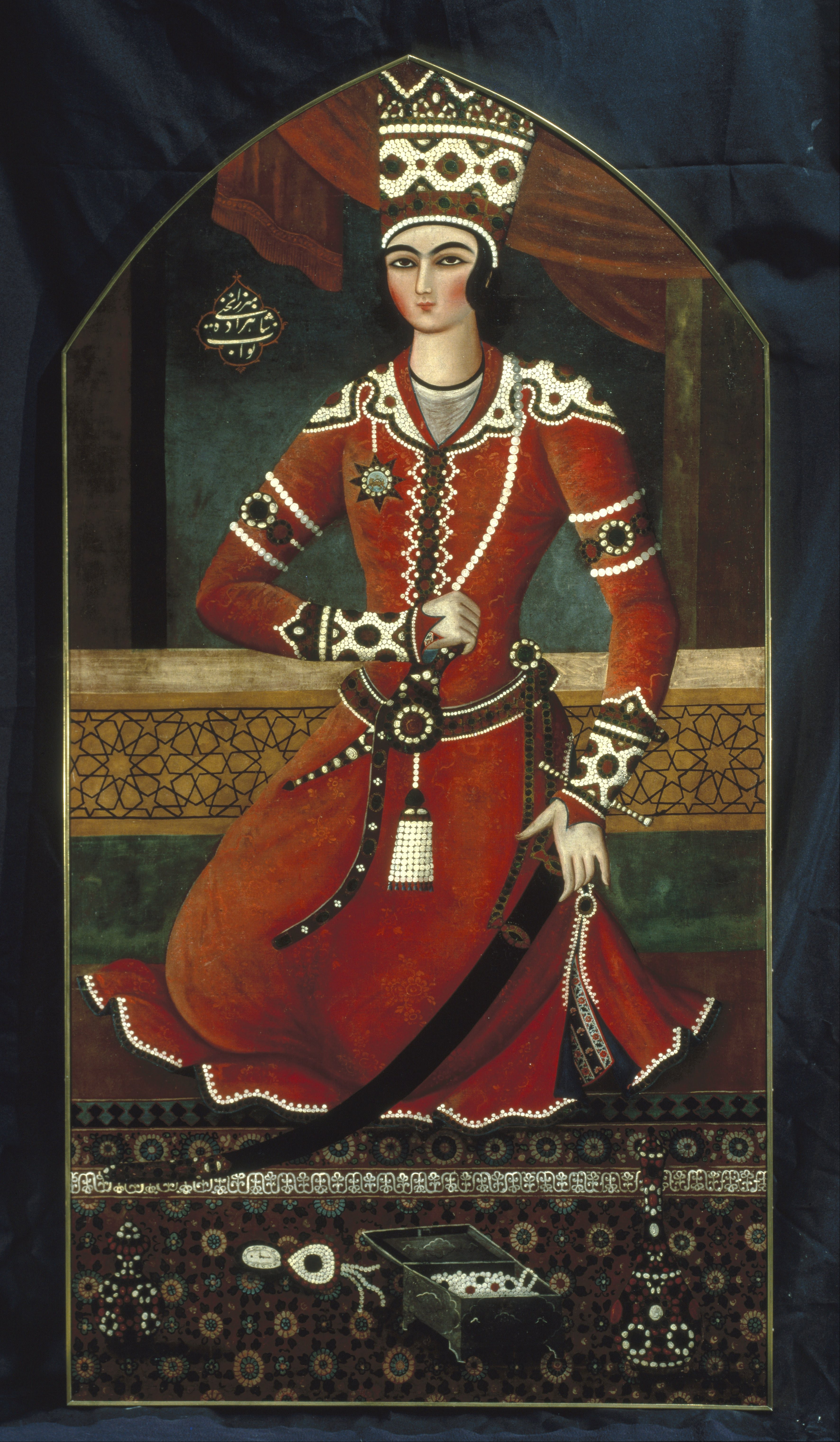
Muhammad Hasan (Iranian, active 1808–1840). Prince Yahya, ca. the 1830s. Prince Yahya, born in 1817, was the forty-third son of the Qajar ruler Fath Ali Shah (r. 1798–1834). Brooklyn Museum

Fath-Ali Shah is reported to have had more than 1,000 spouses. He was survived by fifty-seven sons and forty-six daughters, along with 296 grandsons and 292 granddaughters.

A book published in England in 1874 provided different numbers:

"It is believed that Fetteh Ali had the largest number of children ever born to a man. Like a pious Mohammedan, he had only four wives, but his harem generally contained from 800 to 1,000 ladies. By these, he had 130 sons and 150 daughters, and it is believed that at the time of his death his descendants numbered five thousand souls. The three grandsons who merit notice were the sons of Hussein Ali, the governor of Fars, who aspired to the throne. The princes, Riza Kuli Mirza, Nejeff Kuli Mirza, and Timour Mirza, were at Shiraz when their father attempted to seize the throne. They were able to make their escape from the city."

While this is a large number of children, the claim that Fatḥ-ʻAli holds the record is not true. (Moulay Ismail ibn Sharif, who lived a hundred years earlier in Morocco, is said to hold the record for the largest number of children born to a man.)

Fatḥ-Ali's first son, Mohammad Ali Mirza Dowlat Shah, was seven months older than the second son Abbas Mirza. Yet it was the latter who was named "Wali-ahd" or crown prince. This was because Dowlat Shah's mother, Ziba Chehreh Khanoum, was of non-Qajar origin (she was a Georgian woman), and therefore he was passed over in favour of his younger brother.

=== Consorts ===
Here, a non-exhaustive list of Fath-Ali Shah's consorts is arranged in an interactive, sortable table.

Consorts
No.	Name	Birth	Marriage	Death	Mother	Father	Notes
1	Badr Jahan Khanum	1771 Bastam	1782	Shiraz	Ms. Khazimeh	Mohammad Jafar Khan Bastami Arab	first wife and first permanent wife; Her mother, Ms. Khazimeh, was a daughter of Ismail Khan Khazimeh, governor of Qaenat; Her father was the governor of Bastam; died a few years after 1801.
2	Ziba Chehar Khanum	Georgia				Mr. Tzicarashwili	a Georgian woman from the Tzicarashwili family
3	Asiya Khanum Devellu		1782	1815		Fath-Ali Khan Qajar Devellu	a permanent wife; buried in Karbala
4	Asiya Khanum Qovanlu			Mazandaran		Mohammad Khan Qovanlu Qajar	a permanent wife; a sister of Soleyman Khan Nezam-ed-Dowleh Qovanlu Qajar; formerly married to Mehdi Qoli Khan Qovanlu Qajar, uncle of Fath-Ali Shah and was the mother Ebrahim Khan Zahir-od-Dowleh from that marriage; After the death of Mehdi Qoli Khan, Agha Mohammad Khan married her to Fath-Ali Shah.
5	Nooshafrin Khanum					Badar Khan Zand	
6	Maryam Khanum	Mazandaran					a Jewish woman; prior to this marriage, a wife of Agha Mohammad Khan Qajar until his martyrdom
7	Hajiyeh Badr al-Nesa Khanum Badran			Tehran		Mostafa Qoli Khan Qajar Qovanlu (Fath-Ali Shah's uncle)	divorced; She went to Mecca for the Hajj pilgrimage but died on her return; buried in Karbala
8	Naneh Khanum Ostad (Hajieh Ostad)		c. 1792			Mohammad Khan Mazandarani Pazavari	a sister of Muhammad Mahdi Khan Pazavari (Shahneh); She married to Fath-Ali Khan prior to 1793 when he was the crown prince (1786-1797).
9	Fatemeh Khanum (Sonbol Baji Khanum)	1786 Kerman	1793			Mr. Rahvari	a sister of Ali Akbar Khan Rahvari from the Bolouk of Kerman; When she was seven years old, Agha Mohammad Khan took her captive in the conquest of Kerman in 1793 and engaged her to Fath-Ali Shah.
10	Kheyr al-Nessa Khanum (Aay Baaji)		1798	Golpayegan		Morteza Qoli Khan Qajar Qavanlu (Fath-Ali Shah's uncle)	a permanent wife; Following her son's appointment as the governor of Golpayegan, she moved together with her son and settled there.
11	Maryam Khanum (Maryam Begom)					Sheikh Ali Khan Zand	a permanent wife; Following her son's appointment as the governor of Malayer and Tuyserkan, she moved together with her son and settled there.
12	Tawus Khanum (Taj-od-Dowleh)	Esfahan					a concubine of Georgian descent and Fath-Ali Shah's favorite wife
13	Golbadan Baji Khanum (Khazen-ol-Dowleh)	Georgia					a Georgian concubine, originally a woman in service to Fath-Ali Shah's mother;
14	Kulsum Khanum						from a family of Sayyeds of Pazvar
15	Begum Jan Khanum Qazvini	Qazvin				Hajji Sadegh Qazvini	
16	Agha Baji Begum					Ibrahim Khalil Khan of Karabakh	a permanent wife; She became a permanent wife following the death of Asiya Khanum Qovanlu.
17	Begom Khanum					Sadiq Khan Shaqaqi of Sarab Khanate	
18	Gol Pirhan Khanum	Tbilisi					an Armenian concubine from Tbilisi
19	Homa Khanum	Mazandaran					a Kurdish woman from the Jahan Bayglu family
20	Qamar Nesa Begom					Hossein Qoli Khan Afshar Urumi	a granddaughter of Imam Qoli Khan Afshar who was the commander-in-chief of Azarbaijan Urumi
21	Khatun Jan Khanum					Lotf Ali Beyk Esfahani	a sister of Golrukh Khanum (wife of Farukh Khan Amin-od-Dowleh)
22	Mehr Nesa Khanum						sister of Mahmud Khan Dunbuli
23	Shah Pasand Khanum	Shiraz	c. 1805				born to an artist family; a dancer in Fath-Ali Shah’s court; married in 1805 or earlier.
24	Naneh Khanum Barforoush (Mahd-e Olya)		1805				
25	Moshtari Khanum	Shiraz					born to an artist family; a musician, singer, and dancer in Fath-Ali Shah’s court; aged about 100 years.
26	Tootee Khanum	Lorestan		1839; Tehran			form the Lurs of Zand; a dancer in Fath-Ali Shah’s court; buried in Rey.
27	Shah Pasand Khanum	Zanjan					from the people of Khamseh
28	Shah Navaz Khanum	Bilbas					from the Kurdish tribes; a dancer in Fath-Ali Shah’s court.
29	Shah Parvar Khanum	Qaradagh Azarbaijan				Dadash Beik Nayeb Farrash Bashi	from the Turkish people; a musician (Setar and Chogoor player) and dancer in Fath-Ali Shah’s court.
30	Pari Shah Khanum (Haji Shah)	Armenia					from the Georgian-Armenian people; an actor and a tightrope walker in Fath-Ali Shah’s court; After 1834, she went to Mecca for pilgrimage and became known as Haji Shah.

See more consorts
- Arezou Khanom, from the Shahsavan Zargar;
- Agha Begom, daughter of Seyyed Morad Khan Zand;
- Agha Begom, descendant of the Safavid shahs;
- Alagoz Khanum, from the Bastam people;
- Alagoz Khanum Qarabaqi, of Georgian descent from Tbilisi and a servant of Aghabaji;
- Ahou Khanum, an Armenian;
- Banafsheh Badaam or Neghieh Badaam, an Armenian from Azerbaijan;
- Bibi Khanom, daughter of Yussef Khan Barforoushi;
- Bibi Kouchak Khanom, sister of Sadeq Khan Boroudjerdi;
- Begum Khanum, daughter of Hajji Elyaas Tajrishi;
- Begom Khanom, of the people of Varamin;
- Fatemeh Khanom also known as Faati Baaji;
- Golbakht Khanom, a Turkoman from Yamut and former wife of Agha Mohammad Khan Qajar;
- Gowhar Khanom, daughter of Nadir Quli Khan Zand;
- Gowhar Khanom, daughter of Fath-Ali Khan, son of Riza Quli Khan, who was Fath-Ali Shah's uncle;
- Gowhar Khanom, daughter of Khan Baba Khan Nankuli;
- Gowhar Khanom, from the Kulyayi clan;
- Gowhar Taj Khanom, daughter of Mirza Mohammad Khan Qajar Davalou, Beglarbegi of Tehran and sister of Allahyar Khan Asif al-Dawlah;
- Hajjieh Khanom, of the people of Talesh;
- Husn-e Molk Khanom, of the Lezgi people;
- Jan Begom, from the people of Qom;
- Jan Jan Khanom, from the people of Isfahan;
- Jan Jan Khanom, another wife from the people of Isfahan;
- Jahan Khanom, from the tribe of Bajelan;
- Jahan Afrouz Khanom;
- Jahan Afrouz Khanom, daughter of Seyyed Nazar Khan Biranvand;
- Javaher Khanom, from the Torkaman tribe;
- Jeyran Khanom, from the Koklan tribe of the Torkaman;
- Khatun Baji, of the people of Mazandaran;
- Hajjieh Khatun Jan Khanom, daughter of Mohammad Ali Khan Zand, son of Karim Khan Zand;
- Khan Jan Khanom, from the people of Isfahan;
- Khanum Jan Khanom, daughter of Mohammad Ali Khan Zand, son of Karim Khan Zand;
- Khanum Jani Khanom, daughter of Ebrahim Khan Taleshi;
- Khanum Jani Khanom, from the Sadat of Mazandaran;
- Khanum Kouchak, daughter of Mohammad Taghi Khan Zand, and great great grand-daughter Karim Khan Zand;
- Khatayeh Khanom;
- Khadijeh Khanom, a Jew;
- Khadijeh Khanom, another Jew;
- Khadijeh Khanom (m. 1800), daughter of Mohammad Khan Ezzodinlou Qajar;
- Kheradeh Khanom, sister of Abolghassem Khan Tehrani;
- Khajeh Baji, responsible for the personal articles of toiletry of Fath-Ali Shah;
- Kheyr al-Nessa Khanom (m. 1796), daughter of Shahrokh Shah, son of Reza Qoli Mirza and grandson of Nader Shah Afshar;
- Kheyr al-Nessa Khanom, of the Balbas Kurds;
- Kheyr al-Nessa Khanom, also known as Aay Baji, daughter of Majnoun Khan Pazouki;
- Khosh Nama Khanom, a Georgian;
- Mah Afrin Khanom, daughter of Gol Mohammad Khan Shirazi;
- Maryam Begom also known as Begum Khanom, daughter of Imam Qoli Khan Afshar and sister of Hossein Qoli Khan Afshar Oroumi;
- Maryam Khanom, a Georgian;
- Mirza Maryam Khanom, daughter of Mirza Salih Tehrani; held the position of secretary (mustawfiyyeh) in the harem;
- Malik Sultan Khanom, daughter of Ebrahim Khan Sardar Qajar Davalou;
- Malek Jahan Khanom, from the people of Isfahan
- Nabat Khanom (div.), a Jew; former wife of Ja'far Quli Khan, Fath-Ali Shah's uncle; after her divorce from Fath-Ali Shah, she was married to Mirza Shafi, the premier;
- Nessa Baji, from the people of Talish;
- Parizad Khanom, of the people of Qazvin;
- Sakineh Khanom, from the people of Isfahan;
- Setareh Khanom;
- Shah Pari Khanom also known as Sardar;
- Shahr Banu Khanom, from Khodabandehlou tribe;
- Soltan Khanom, daughter of Allah Qoli Khan Qajar Davalou, son of Jan Mohammad Khan Qajar Davalou;
- Tarlan Khanom (m. 1798), daughter of Allah Yar Khan Qalijah;
- Zaynab Khanom, sister of Ali Khan Bakhtiari;
- Zaynab Khanom, daughter of Ahmad Khan Muqaddam, Bayglarbaygi of Maraghah;
- Ziba Chehr Khanom, sister of Nassir Khan Shirkouhi;
- Zuleikha Khanom, of the Turkaman;

=== Children ===
Here, a non-exhaustive list of Fath-Ali Shah's children is arranged in an interactive sortable table. The table's denotations are:

- S: Son
- D: Daughter

Children
No.	S/D	Name	Title	Birth	Death	Mother	Spouse(s)	Notes
1	S	Mohammad Ali Mirza	Dowlatshah	1789	1821	Ziba Chehr Khanum		
2	S	Mohammad Qoli Mirza	Molk Ara	1789	1872	Asiya Khanum Qovanlu		
3	S	Mohammad Vali Mirza		1789	1864	Bibi Kuchak Khanum		
4	S	Abbas Mirza	Nayeb os-Saltaneh	1789	1833	Asiya Khanum Devellu		
5	S	Hossein Ali Mirza	Farman Farma	1789	1835	Badr Jahan Khanum		
6	S	Hasan Ali Mirza	Shoja os-Saltaneh	1790	1854	Badr Jahan Khanum		
7	S	Mohammad Taqi Mirza	Hessam os-Saltaneh	1791	1853			
8	S	Ali Naqi Mirza	Rokn od-Dowleh	1793		Begum Jan Khanum		
9	S	Ali Shah Mirza	Zell os-Soltan	1795	1854	Asiya Khanum Devellu		
10	S	Sheikh Ali Mirza	Sheikh ol-Molouk	1796		Hajiye Khanum		
11	S	Abdollah Mirza	Dara	1796	1846	Kulsum Khanum		
12	S	Emamverdi Mirza	Keshikchi Bashi	1796	1869	Begum Jan Khanum		
13	S	Mohammad Reza Mirza	Afsar	1797				
14	S	Mahmud Mirza		1799	1835	Maryam Khanum		
15	S	Heydar Qoli Mirza		1799		Kheyr o-Nesa Khanum		
16	S	Homayoun Mirza		1801	1856	Maryam Khanum		died: 1856/1857
17	S	Allah Verdi Mirza	Navab	1801	1843	Banafshah Badam Khanum		
18	S	Esma'il Mirza		1802	1853			
19	S	Ahmad Ali Mirza		1804	1852	Maryam Khanum		
20	S	Ali Reza Mirza						
21	S	Keyghobad Mirza		1806		Shah Pasand Khanum (Shirazi)		
22	S	Haj Bahram Mirza		1806				
23	S	Shapour Mirza		1807				
24	S	Malek Iraj Mirza		1807				
25	S	Manouchehr Mirza	Baha ol-Molk					
26	S	Keykavous Mirza		1807		Shah Pasand Khanum (Shirazi)		
27	S	Malek Ghassem Mirza		1807	1859			
28	S	Shah Qoli Mirza		1808				
29	S	Mohammad Mehdi Mirza	Zargam ol-Molk	1808		Moshtari Khanum		
30	S	Jahanshah Mirza		1809		Maryam Khanum		
31	S	Keykhosrow Mirza	Sepahsalar	1809		Shah Pasand Khanum (Shirazi)		
32	S	Haji Kiumars Mirza	Abol-Molouk (Molk-Ara)	1809	1872	Pari Shah Khanum (Haji Shah)		died: 1872/1873
33	S	Soleiman Mirza	Shoa od-Dowleh	1810				
34	S	Fathollah Mirza	Shoa os-Saltaneh	1811	1869	Sonbol Baji		He married the daughter of Ebrahim Khan Zahir od-Dowleh.
35	S	Malek Mansour Mirza		1811				
36	S	Bahman Mirza	Baha od-Dowleh	1811		Khazen od-Dowleh		
37	S	Soltan Mohammad Mirza	Sayf o-Dowleh	1812	1899	Taj ol-Dowleh		
38	S	Soltan Ebrahim Mirza		1813		Begum Jan Khanum		
39	S	Soltan Mostafa Mirza		1813				
40	S	Seyfollah Mirza	Jahanbani	1814		Khazen od-Dowleh		
41	S	Yahya Mirza		1817		Begum Khanum		
42	S	Mohammad-Amin Mirza		1819	1886	Moshtari Khanum		
43	S	Zakaria Mirza		1819				s.p.
44	S	Farrokhseyr Mirza	Nayer od-Dowleh	1819		Taj ol-Dowleh		
45	S	Soltan Hamzeh Mirza		1819				
46	S	Tahmoures Mirza		1820				s.p.
47	S	Aliqoli Mirza	Etezad os-Saltaneh	1822		Gol Pirhan Khanum		
48	S	Soltan Ahmad Mirza	Azod od-Dowleh	1824	1902	Taj ol-Dowleh		
49	S	Eskandar Mirza	Saheb Khaghan					
50	S	Parviz Mirza	Nayer od-Dowleh			Begum Khanum		
51	S	Jalal ed-Din Mirza	Ehtesham ol-Molk	1826		Humai Khanum		
52	S	Amanollah Mirza	Agha Lili					
53	S	Soltan Hossein Mirza				Allahqoz Khanum		
54	S	Hossein Qoli Mirza	Jahansouz Mirza	1830	1900	Begum Khanum		Amir Toman; died: 1900/1901
55	S	Haj Abbas Qoli Mirza				Gol Pirhan Khanum		
56	S	Noor-od-Dahr Mirza				Gol Pirhan Khanum		
57	S	Kamran Mirza				Naneh Khanum Barforoush		
58	S	Orangzeb Mirza		1830	1867	Naneh Khanum Barforoush		born: 1830/1831; died: 1867/1868
59	S	Mohammad Hadi Mirza		1832	1897	Moshtari Khanum		born in 1824 or 1832
60	D	Homayoon Soltan	Khanum Khanuman, Khan Baji	1786		Badr Jahan Khanum	Ebrahim Khan Zahir-o-Dowleh	
61	D	Begum Jan Khanum	Jan Baji	c. 1787	c. 1833	Badr Jahan Khanum	Mohammad-Qasem Zahir-o-Dowleh	mother of Malek Jahan Khanom and grandmother of Naser al-Din Shah; died before 1834.
62	D	Seyyedeh Begum Khanum	Hamdam Soltan	c. 1792	1833	Badr Jahan Khanum	Mohammad-Zaki Khan Noori	died of Cholera in Mecca
63	D	Tayghun Khanum		1793		Naneh Khanum Ostad		
64	D	Fakhr Jahan Khanum	Fakhr-od-Dowleh	1798	1858	Sonbol Baji	Mirza Mohammad Khan	Mirza Mohammad Khan was a son of Hossein Qoli Khan (Fath-Ali Shah's brother); She divorced him.
65	D	Shah Beigum Khanum	Zia os-Saltaneh	1799	1873	Maryam Khanum	Haji Mirza Masoud	After her father's death, she married Haji Mirza Masoud, the minister of foreign affairs.
66	D	Soltan Beigum Khanum			1826	Maryam Khanum	Mohammad Khan Qajar	She was born in or after 1799 and died childless. Her husband, Mohammad Khan Qajar, was a son of Mehdi-Qoli Khan Davallu, the general.
67	D	Khadijeh Soltan Begum	Esmat o-Dowleh				Mirza Ebrahim Khan Nazer	Ebrahim Khan was a son of Haji Mohammad Hossein Khan Sadr-e Esfahani. They had one daughter and three sons: Sadr ed-Dowleh, Assef ed-Dowleh and Mohammad Bagher Khan
68	D	Sarv Jahan Khanum				Fati Baji	Aga Khan I	Fati Baji was a servant of Sonbol Baji
69	D	Gowhar Malek Khanum	Shah Bibi			Asiya Khanum Devellu	1. Mohammad-Amin Khan Devellu; 2. Mirza Abol-Qasem Farahani; 3. Seyyed Sadr-od-Din Tabrizi	She married three times: Her first husband, Mohammad-Amin Khan Devellu, was the head of the corporal punishment unit in the Qajar court. After some time, she divorced him and married Mirza Abol-Qasem Farahani, who was the deputy prime minister. After his assassination, she married Seyyed Sadr-od-Din Tabrizi.
70	D	Ezzat Nesā Khanum				Naneh Khanum Ostad		
71	D	Gowhar Khanum				Gowhar Khanum		
72	D	Habbeh Nabat Khanum		c. 1804		Moshtari Khanum	Amir Kabir Mirza Mohammad Khan	Mohammad Khan was a son of Hossein-Qoli Khan (Fath-Ali Shah's brother). She was his second wife, i.e., after Fakhr Jahan Khanum; They too separated.
73	D	Pasha Khanum		c. 1806		Moshtari Khanum	Sohrab Khan Gorji	Sohrab Khan was Fath-Ali Shah's treasurer. She was his second wife.
74	D	Farzaneh Beigom Khanum		c. 1817		Moshtari Khanum	Hossein-Ali Khan Moayyer ol-Mamalek	Hossein-Ali Khan (1798-1858) was in the mint industry, i.e. coin manufacturer.
75	D	Mehr Jahan Khanum				Moshtari Khanum	Zeinol Abedin Khan Yuz Bashi	Zeinol Abedin Khan was a commander of 100 cavalrymen and son of Ghasem Hezar Jaribi (the head of servants).
76	D	Hosn Jahan Khanum	Valieh		1861	Sonbol Baji	Khosro Khan	Khosro Khan was the governor of Kordestan. After his death in 1834, his son Reza Qoli Khan became the governor at a young age. Due to lack of maturity for the role, she acted as Reza Qoli Khan's regent in governorship of Kordestan.
77	D	Tajli Begum Khanum				Sonbol Baji	Nasrollah Khan	Nasrollah Khan was a son of Ebrahim Khan Zahir-od-Dowleh.
78	D	Mahnoosh Lab Khanum	Eftekhar-os-Saltaneh			Nooshafarin Khanum	Mirza Nabi Khan Qazvini	died after 1834; Mirza Nabi Khan was a courtier.
79	D	Mah Taban Khanum	Qamar-os-Saltaneh			Nooshafarin Khanum	Mirza Hosein Khan Sepahsalar	married after 1834; Mirza Hosein Khan was a son of Mirza Nabi Khan Qazvini. He became Nasereddin Shah's prime minister.
80	D	Agha Beigom				Shah Navaz Khanum	Mirza Ali Hezar Jaribi Sadr-ol-Mamalek	
81	D	Khavar Soltan				Gol Pirhan Khanum		

== See also ==
- Samson Makintsev
- Tangeh Savashi near Tehran, where Fath-Ali Shah had a relief carved into the side of a mountain pass.
- Imperial Crown Jewels of Persia
- Naderi throne
- Shah Diamond
- Qara Bayat Amirdom

== Sources ==
- Amanat, Abbas (1997). Pivot of the Universe: Nasir Al-Din Shah Qajar and the Iranian Monarchy, 1831–1896. I.B.Tauris. ISBN 978-1845118280.
- Diba, Layla S. (1 January 2006). Introducing Fath 'Ali Shah: Production and Dispersal of the Shahanshahnama Manuscripts. Brill Publishers. doi:10.1163/9789004492554_018.
- Amanat, Abbas (1999). "Fatḥ-ʿAlī Shah Qājār". In Yarshater, Ehsan (ed.). Encyclopædia Iranica. Vol. IX/4: Fārs II–Fauna III. London and New York: Routledge & Kegan Paul. pp. 407–421. ISBN 978-0-933273-32-0.
- Amanat, Abbas; Vejdani, Farzin (2008). "Jalāl-al-Din Mirzā". Encyclopaedia Iranica, Vol. XIV, Fasc. 4. pp. 405–410.
- Azodi, Ahmad Mirza Azdo-Dowleh (1887). تاریخ عضدی [Azodi History] (in Persian). Maharat.
- Bamdad, Mehdi (1979). شرح حال رجال ایران در قرن ۱۲ و ۱۳ و ۱۴ هجری [Biographies of Iran's Elites in 1688-1979] (in Persian). Zavar.
- Bournoutian, George (2020). From the Kur to the Aras: A Military History of Russia's Move into the South Caucasus and the First Russo-Iranian War, 1801–1813. Leiden: Brill. ISBN 978-90-04-44515-4.
- Divanbeigi Shirazi, Seyyed Ahmad; Navaee, Abdolhossein (1987). حدیقة الشعراء (در شرح حال و آثار شاعران دوره قاجاریه از سال 1200 تا 1300 هجری قمری) [Garden of Poets (Biographies of Poets in the Qajar era from 1785 to 1883)] (in Persian). Zarrin.
- Khavari, Mirza Fazlollah Shirazi (1845). Tarikh Zol Qarnein (تاریخ ذوالقرنین) (in Persian). Ministry of Culture and Islamic Guidance of Iran.
- Mousavi, M. (2018). "Fatḥ-ʿAlī Shah". Christian-Muslim Relations. A Bibliographical History. Volume 12 Asia, Africa and the Americas (1700-1800). Brill. doi:10.1163/2451-9537_cmrii_COM_33271.
- Sepehr, Mohammad Taqi Lesanolmolk (1855). ناسخ التواریخ تاریخ قاجاریه [Qajar History] (in Persian). Asatir.
- Tapper, Richard (1997). Frontier Nomads of Iran: A Political and Social History of the Shahsevan. Cambridge University Press. ISBN 978-0-52158-336-7.

Fath-Ali Shah Qajar Qajar dynasty Born: 5 August 1772 Died: 23 October 1834
Iranian royalty
Preceded by Agha Mohammad Khan Qajar	Shah of Iran; 1797–1834	Succeeded by Mohammad Shah Qajar
