= Ebrahim Khan =

Qajar governor of Kerman

Ebrahim Khan ابراهیم خان ظهیرالدوله
- Born: 1770s Iran
- Died: 1824; Tehran, Iran
- Spouse: Homayn Soltan
- Dynasty: Qajar dynasty
- Father: Mahdi Qoli Khan Qajar
- Mother: Asia Khanum

Ebrahim Khan Zahir od-Dowleh (Persian: ابراهیم خان ظهیرالدوله) was an Iranian statesman from the Qajar dynasty. He is mostly known for being the governor of the Kerman province for 22 years (1803–1824).

== Life ==
Ebrahim Khan was from the Qawanlu (also spelled Qoyunlu) branch of the Qajar family; he was the son of Mehdi-Qoli Khan, who was the brother of the Qajar ruler Agha Mohammad Khan Qajar, and thus a paternal uncle of Fath-Ali Shah. Ebrahim Khan's mother was Asia Khanum, who was daughter of a certain Mohammad Khan Qawanlu. The date of Ebrahim Khan's birth is unknown, but he is known to have been a child when his father died during the siege of Astarabad in 1783 by the Zand ruler Karim Khan. After the early death of Ebrahim Khan's father, Agha Mohammad Khan married his mother, and then treated and raised Ebrahim Khan as one of his own sons along with his two nephews Fath-Ali Shah and Hosayn-Qoli Khan. In 1791, Ebrahim Khan married Fath-Ali Shah's eldest daughter Homayun Soltan. On 17 June 1797, Agha Mohammad Khan died and was succeeded by Fath-Ali Shah, who held Ebrahim Khan in high esteem and gave him the honorific title of "Zahir od-Dowleh" and "Ebrahim Khan-e Amu". Ebrahim was around this time appointed as the governor of Khorasan.

In 1803, Ebrahim Khan was appointed as the governor of Kerman, a region which had been subject to destruction by Agha Mohammad Khan and was troubled by the local rulers of the province. Ebrahim Khan greatly paid respect the province, and in the words of Mehrnoush Soroush, "undertook a comprehensive restoration plan and was remarkably successful in reconstructing socio-economic infrastructure and maintaining the political stability of Kerman and its surrounding regions."

He also requested Fath-Ali Shah to temporally free the province from tax in order to restore the economy of the province. Furthermore, Ebrahim Khan also successfully fought against the local rulers of the region, and thus secured the province from trouble, which made the province able to resume trade. However, Ebrahim Khan also needed great manpower in order to restore the economy of the province, but because of the great population loss of the province during the campaigns of Agha Mohammad Khan, Ebrahim Khan was forced to ask for help from the inhabitants of the provinces close to Kerman, and managed to make many resettle in Kerman.

Furthermore, he patronized Islamic schools and invited religious scholars from Khuzestan, Fars, and Khorasan. Some of these religious scholars were Shaikh Ne'mat-Allah Bahrayni, Shaikh Abd al-Hosayn Ahsa'i, Molla Ali A'ma, and Sayyed Kazem Rashti. Not only did he patronize religious scholars, but also did the same with poets, and himself wrote some poems under the pen name of Toghrol.

=== Death ===
In 1824, Ebrahim Khan appointed his eldest son Abbas-Qoli Mirza as his regent in Kerman and his other son Rostam Khan as his regent in Bam, and, like some other governors, went to Iranian capital of Tehran in order to participate in a certain event. During his stay in Tehran, he died of illness. According to the author of the Ma'ather-e Soltaniya, "he was a young, good-humored, kind person."

== Sources ==
- Momen, Moojan (1982). Studies in Bábí and Bahá'í History. Kalimat Press. pp. 1–337. ISBN 9781890688455.
- MacEoin, Denis (2009). The Messiah of Shiraz: Studies in Early and Middle Babism. Leiden and Boston: BRILL. pp. 1–738. ISBN 9789004170353.
- Soroush, Mehrnoush (2011). "ẒAHIR-AL-DAWLA, EBRĀHIM KHAN". Encyclopaedia Iranica.
