= Al-Atabat Al-Aliyat =

Najaf نَجَف an-Najaf اَلـنَّـجَـف
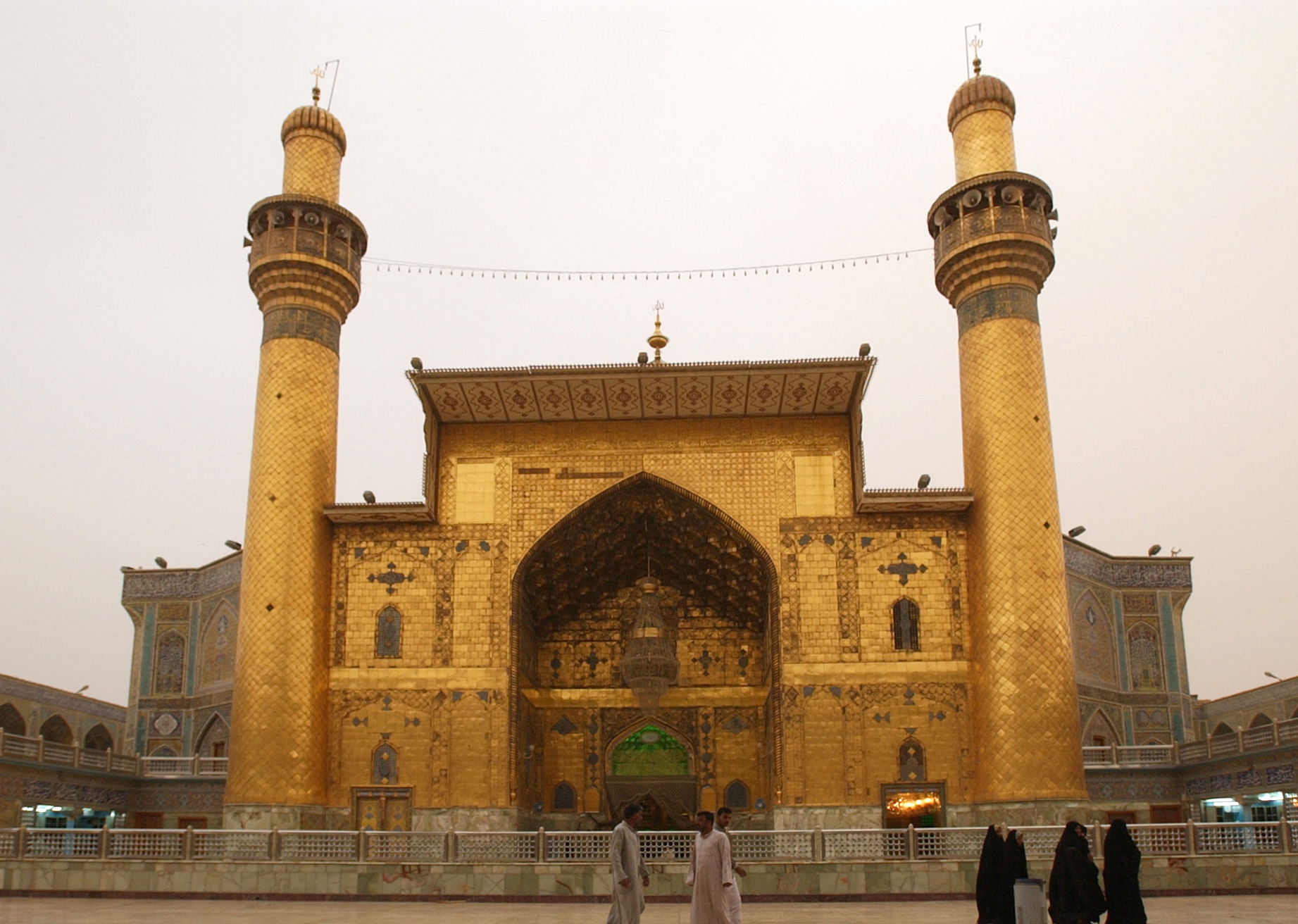
- Masjid al-Imam ‘Ali, one of the most important sites of Najaf

- Location of Najaf within Iraq
- Coordinates: 32°00′00″N 44°20′00″E
- Country: Iraq
- Province: Najaf Governorate

Al-Atabat Al-Aliyat (Arabic: العتبات العالیات lit. sublime thresholds), which is also known as Al-Atabat Al-Muqaddasa (literally: holy doorsteps) are the shrines of six Shia Imams which are in four cities of Iraq, namely Najaf, Karbala, Kadhimiya, and Samarra; and actually the whole of these Imams' shrines (graves) are called Atabat Aliyat. The mentioned cities have significance due to shrines of those six Shia Imams who have been buried there.

== Najaf ==
Najaf is a city in central Iraq about 160 km (roughly 100 miles) south of Baghdad. Its estimated population in 2013 was 1,000,000 people.

Najaf (city) is the capital of Najaf Governorate. It is widely considered the third holiest city of Shi'a Islam, the Shia world's spiritual capital and the center of Shi'a political power in Iraq. Ali ibn Abi Talib's shrine is there as a part of Atabat Aliyat.

== Karbala ==
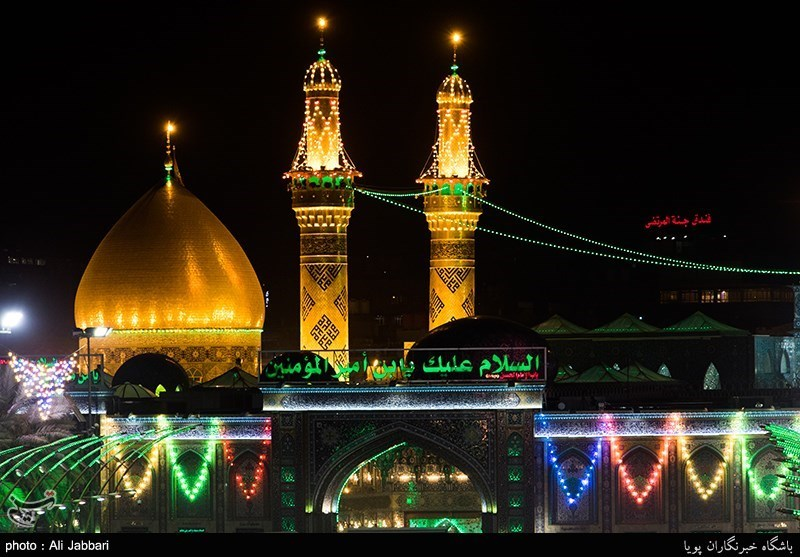
Karbala

Karbala is a city in Iraq, that is considered as the place of happening Ashura event. The most significant shrines/graves of Karbala are related to Husayn ibn Ali and Abbas ibn Ali's shrine. There are also the graves of Husayn's son (Ali Akbar) and his other companions in his shrine.

== Kadhimiya ==
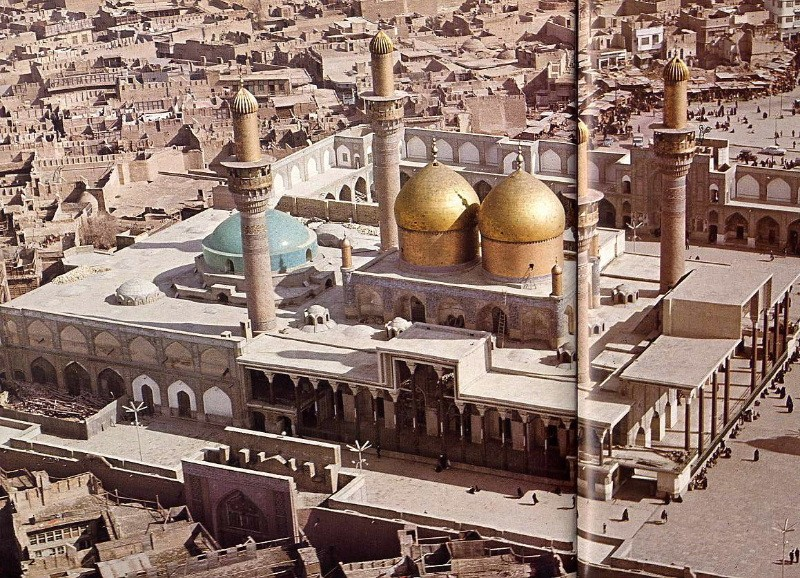
Kadhimiya

Kadhimiyyah or al-Kazimain is located tigris bank where is toward Baghdad as the capital of Iraq. There are the shrines of Musa al-Kadhim (the 7th Imam of Shia Islam) and Muhammad al-Jawad (as the 9th Imam of Shia Islam) in this city.

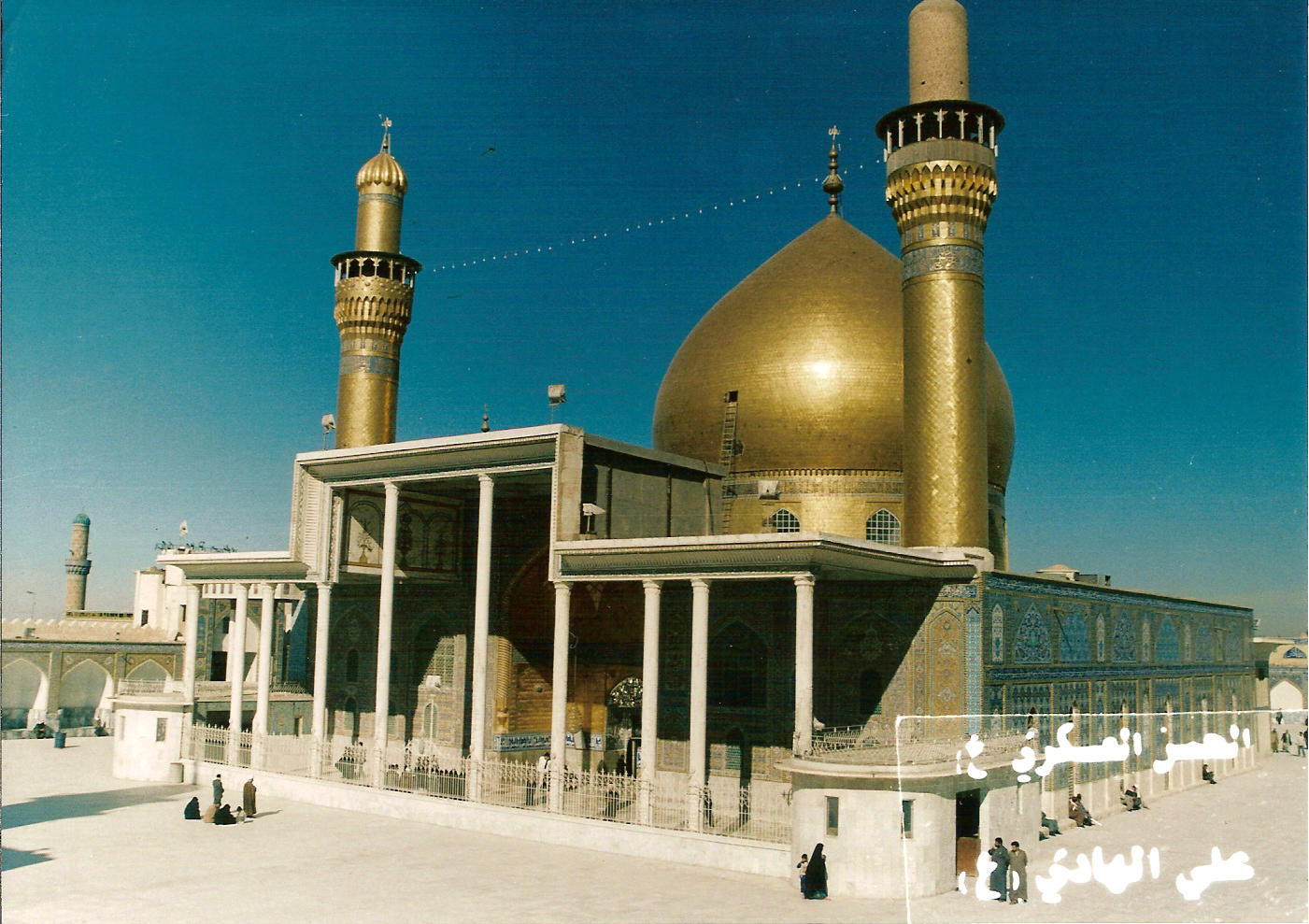
Samarra

== Samarra ==
Samarra is a city in Iraq where stands on the north of Baghdad. The tenth Imam of Shia (Al-Hadi) and the eleventh Imam of Shia (Hassan Askari) are buried there, and it is regarded as one of Atabat Aliyat destinations.

== See also ==
- Battle of Karbala
- Family tree of Muhammad#Family tree linking prophets to Imams
- List of casualties in Husayn's army at the Battle of Karbala
- Sayyid
- Arbaʽeen Pilgrimage
