= Jafar Qoli Khan Donboli =

Khan of Khoy & Khan of Tabriz

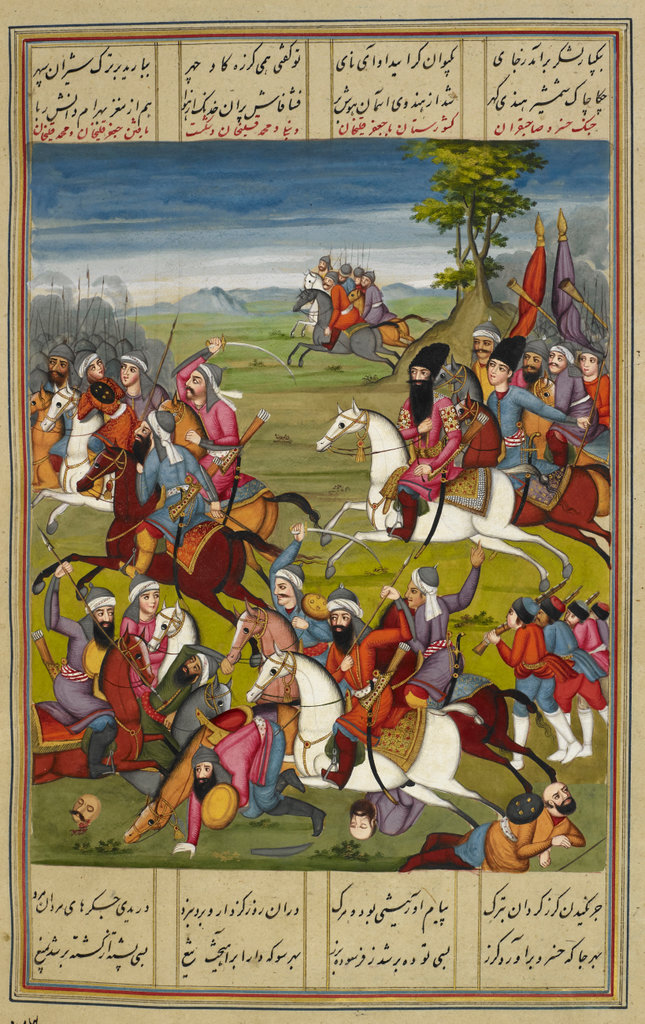
- Fath-Ali Shah's defeat of Jafar Qoli Khan Donboli and Mohammad Qoli Khan, folio from the Shahinshahnama of Fath-Ali Khan Saba, dated 1810

Khan of Khoy
- Reign: 1798–1799
- Predecessor: Hosayn Qoli Donboli
- Successor: Office abolished; Incorporated into Qajar Iran

Khan of Shaki
- Reign: 10 December 1806 – 3 September 1814
- Predecessor: Fath-Ali Khan
- Successor: Ismail Khan Donboli
- Died: 3 September 1814; Shaki, Shaki Khanate, Russian Empire
- Dynasty: Donboli
- Father: Sahbaz Khan Donboli

Jafar Qoli Khan Donboli (Persian: جعفرقلی خان دنبلی) was the last khan of the Khoy Khanate from 1798 to 1799 and penultimate Khan of Shaki from 1806 to 1814.

== Background ==
He was born to either Sahbaz Khan Donboli as their second son in Khoy. He was from Donboli, a Kurdish tribe. Ahmad Khan Donboli was murdered in 1786, and Jafar Qoli had to flee the scene.

== Life under Hosayn Qoli ==
His nephew Hosayn Qoli Donboli soon regained his throne in 1786 thanks to help from Mohammad Qoli Khan Afshar of Urmia Khanate, meanwhile his father's murderers were put to death by Jafar Qoli. Hosayn Qoli had to pay an annual tribute to Mohammad Qoli because of this. Soon later Askar Khan Afshar arrived in Khoy, asking for Hosayn Qoli's help to invade Urmia and rescue his brother Mirza Abolhasan. Using the opportunity to stop paying tributes, Hosayn Qoli agreed to the plan. Khoy army commanded by Jafar Qoli defeated the Urmia army near Aq Ziarat in 1788. However, Mirza Abolhasan was killed by Mohammad Qoli at the suggestion of Khodadad Khan Donboli, Khan of Tabriz, leaving the war inconclusive. Khodadad was killed by Sadeq Khan Shaqaqi the same year.

Meanwhile, Hosayn Qoli befriended Agha Mohammad Khan Qajar, receiving not only Khoy but Tabriz, Ardabil and other parts of Azerbaijan as governorate in 1791. However his marriage to Ibrahim Khalil Khan's daughter raised suspicion by Agha Mohammad, he was replaced by Jafar Qoli briefly. The situation changed in 1797 again when Hosayn Qoli came to be favored by Fath Ali Khan Qajar, Jafar Qoli became a rebel and besieged Khoy with help from Yazidi and Shaqaqi tribesmen. However the death of Hosaynqoli in 1798 forced him to assume the khanate and make peace with Fath Ali.

== Reign in Shaki ==
Jafar Qoli attacked Sadiq Khan in 1798, defeated him, plundered Sarab and forced him to flee to Mughan. During his reign, Donboli tribe numbered 12.000 families. Later he rose up against Fath Ali in 1799, but was defeated by an army sent against him under Abbas Mirza near Salmas. Jafarqoli had to flee to Erivan Khanate and submit to Russians. In June 1804, at the head of his cavalry, as part of the Russian troops, he participated in the siege of Erivan. In July of the same year, he accepted Russian citizenship. On 10 December 1806, Emperor Alexander I approved Jafar Qoli Khan as the new khan of Shaki and promoted him to the rank of lieutenant general. He was presented with the Imperial Certificate and a banner with the state emblem of Russia. A diamond feather, a saber decorated with precious stones and a gold medal sprinkled with diamonds were also awarded. During the Russian-Iranian war of 1804-1813, Jafar Quli Khan fought as a member of the Russian army and was awarded the Order of St. Anna, 1st degree.

He died on 3 September 1814 from malaria. The descendants of Jafar Qoli Khan bore the surname Khoyski.

== Family ==
He had at least three wives with numerous issues:

1. Sharafnisa begüm — sister or daughter of Ishak Pasha of Van Eyalet
  1. Ahmad Khan the Elder — married Shirin begüm (1794-?), daughter of Javad Khan of Ganja and Malaknisa Khanum, daughter of Muhammad Husayn Khan Mushtaq
  2. Ismail Khan Donboli (d. 24 July 1819) — succeeded Jafar Qoli as Khan of Shaki in 1814
  3. Ishaq Pasha — married Kichik Khanum with two issues, and died during his father's lifetime
  4. Abotorab (Abra) Khan (d. 1846) — married Azad or İzzet begüm (?-between 1839 and 1847), daughter of Ibrahim Khalil Khan of Karabakh
  5. Sara Begüm — married Kalbali Khan Khoyski, son of Ahmad Khan Donboli
2. Saltanat begüm — sister of Mohammad Khan of Erivan (1784-1804)
3. Gowhar agha Javanshir (1796-1888) — daughter of Ibrahim Khalil Khan of Karabakh

He is the ancestor of several officials of Azerbaijan Democratic Republic, such as Adil Khan Ziyadkhanov and Ismayil Khan Ziyadkhanov (both served as Deputy Minister of Foreign Affairs), Fatali Khan Khoyski (Prime Minister of Azerbaijan), Rustam Khan Khoyski (Minister of Social Security), Huseyngulu Khan Khoyski (Deputy of Ganja Governorate), Amiraslan Khan Khoyski (governor of Qazax) and poet Gamar Sheyda.

== Sources ==
- Bournoutian, George (2021). From the Kur to the Aras: A Military History of Russia's Move into the South Caucasus and the First Russo-Iranian War, 1801–1813. Brill. ISBN 978-90-04-44515-4.
- Dawud, Ali Al-e; Oberling, Pierre (1995). "Donbolī". In Yarshater, Ehsan (ed.). Encyclopædia Iranica. Vol. VII/5: Divorce IV–Drugs. London and New York: Routledge & Kegan Paul. pp. 492–495. ISBN 978-1-56859-023-3.
- Gledhill, Kevin (2022). "Khoy (Ḵoy)". In Yarshater, Ehsan (ed.). Encyclopædia Iranica (Online ed.). Encyclopædia Iranica Foundation.
