= Bahmani family =

Cadet branch of the Iranian Qajar dynasty

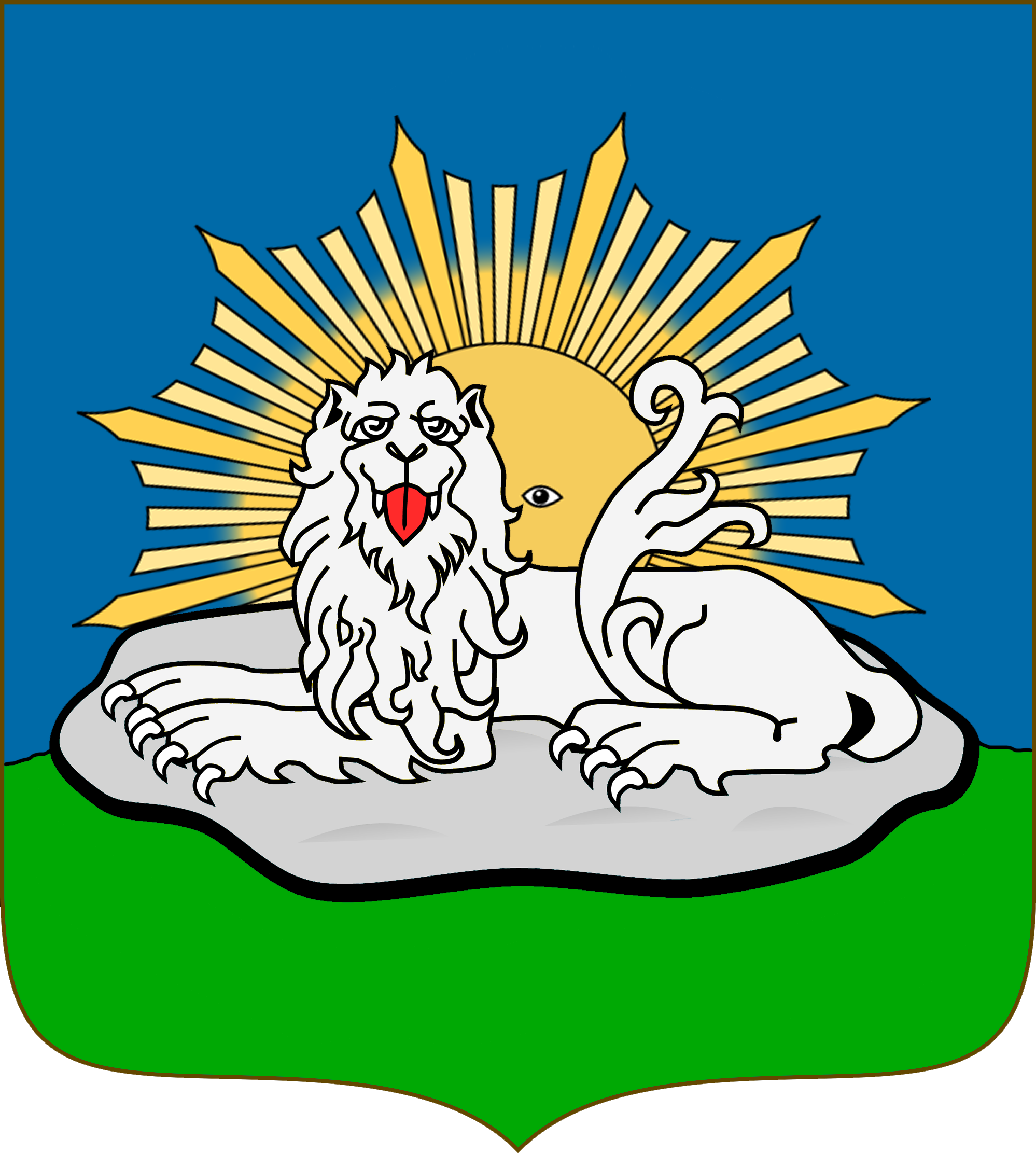
- Parent family: Qajar dynasty
- Current region: Azerbaijan; United States; Iran
- Founded: 1832
- Founder: Bahman Mirza Qajar
- Connected families: Nakhchivanski; Talishkhanovs; Badalbayli family Mehmandarov family Javanshir clan Shahtakhtinski; Ziyadkhanov family Akhundov family
- Heirlooms: Treasury of Bahman Mirza

The House of Bahmani (Persian: خاندان بهمنی, romanized: Khāndān-e Bahmanī), also called Bahmani-Qajar (Persian: بهمنی‌قاجار), is an aristocratic Iranian family belonging to one of the princely families of the Qajar dynasty, the ruling house that reigned Iran 1785–1925. The founder is Bahman Mirza Qajar (1810–1884), the younger brother of Mohammad Shah Qajar and formerly prince regent and governor of Azerbaijan 1841–1848.

During the last quarter of the 19th century, the family was divided into a Russian branch, serving the Tsar, and recognised in 1886 with the titles of Prince Persidskii and Princess Persidskaya styled "His Serene Highness" in the Russian Empire by the Tsar, as well as into a Persian branch in Tehran at the Shah's court, holding the traditional Persian title of shahzadeh ("prince"). Bahman Mirza and his sons used the more familiar style of navvab ("highness"). Many of Bahman Mirza's male offspring were high-ranking officers in the Imperial Russian Army and stayed in the Tsar's service until the October Revolution at Tiflis, Shusha, Ganja and Baku. Many of them served in the Azerbaijan Democratic Republic during the short independence from Russia 1918–1920. With the Soviets coming to power and annexing Azerbaijan, many of Bahman Mirza's sons were executed or fled to Iran.

== Historic background ==
The royal rule of succession of the Qajar dynasty is male primogeniture by a Qajar princess. This special addition means that not automatically the eldest son succeeded his father but the eldest son born by a Qajar princess. All other sons are legitimate but morganatic and have no right to succeed.

This fact caused in the first half of the 19th century troubles within the fruitful imperial family. The eldest princes, often powerful governors and their father's favorites did not automatically accept their younger brothers or nephews superior status.

Bahman Mirza was the 4th son of Crown Prince Abbas Mirza by his cousin and chief wife Na‘abat Khanom, daughter of Mohammad Khan Qajar Davalu. Abbas Mirza was the 4th son and designated heir apparent of Fath-Ali Shah by his chief wife and queen consort Asiya Khanom Devellu, daughter of Fath Ali Khan Qajar Davalu. When Abbas Mirza died in 1833 before Fath Ali Shah, his eldest son Mohammad Mirza became the new crown prince and Bahman Mirza was the next younger brother.

Mohammad Shah, suffering from grave illness, was a weak monarch, hence Bahman Mirza as well as the foreign powers Great Britain and Russia insisted in his regal rights although Mohammad Shah had already an infant son by a Qajar mother, who was proclaimed crown prince in 1835, had still a bad health but was meant to be next ruler as Naser al-Din Shah. Thus, Bahman Mirza wanted to execute the office of acting vicegerent of Azerbaijan, viceroy for his brother and regent for his infant nephew.

In 1847, Bahman Mirza fell out of royal favor due to political intrigues at court and went in 1848 into exile to Russia. He first moved to Tiflis and in 1853 to Karabakh. The family lived there at Shusha where they hold real estates and a large summer palace. Many family members served at the Russian imperial court of Sankt Peterburg and became popular figures in the later Republic of Azerbaijan. In 1872, one of Bahman Mirza's sons arranged with his cousin Naser al-Din Shah and the family was rehabilitated in Iran and invited to return to Tehran. Bahman Mirza refused to go back but some of his children did. Hence, the family was divided into a Russian branch, serving the Tsar, and recognised in 1886 with the titles of Prince Persidskii and Princess Persidskaya styled “His or Her Illustrious Highness“ in the Russian Empire by the Tsar. As well as into an Iranian branch in Tehran at the Shah's court, holding the traditional Persian title of shahzadeh (“prince”). Bahman Mirza used for himself and his mature sons the more familiar style of navvab (“highness”). The Bahmani children and grandchildren were sent to European schools and got the best education. And many of Bahman Mirza's male offspring were high-ranking officers in the Imperial Russian Army and stayed in the Tsar's service until the October Revolution at Tiflis, Shusha, Ganja and Baku. Many of them served in the Azerbaijan Democratic Republic during the short independence from Russia 1918–1920. With the Soviets coming to power and annexing Azerbaijan, many of Bahman Mirza's sons were executed or fled to Iran.

Bahman Mirza issued 61 children — 31 sons and 30 daughters, only 50 survived infancy. So he became the father of the Bahmani-Qajars with the lines of the Qajars of the Southern Caucasus named Bahmanov, Bahmanoglu and Ghajar as well as the Bahman and Bahmani family in Iran. While his daughters, who often had been taken part in many charity events married into most famous families of the South Caucasus like the Akhundov, Badalbeili, Vezirov, Tagiev, Shahtakhtinski, Beglarbegov, Mehmandarov, Abbasovo, Muradov and Mirzov families.

== Coat of arms ==
The family coat of arms based on the old Persian Lion and Sun emblem, the royal symbol since the Seljuq time in the 13th century. In 1785, Agha Mohammad Khan adopted the emblem and under Fath Ali Shah in 1803 it became symbol of the land as well as of royal house, with a crouching lion. In 1871 the current version was published.

Azure on a base Vert a lion guardant couchant Argent upon a rock Argent, all in front of a sun irradiated Or. The shield covered by a robe of estate in a form of a lion's skin Or, two paws visible; lined Argent and ensigned an ancient crown Or of seven visible points, with a cap Gules.

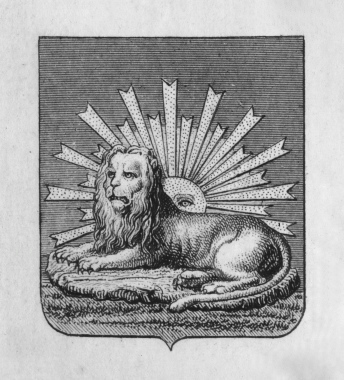
Shield with the Lion-Sun charge.

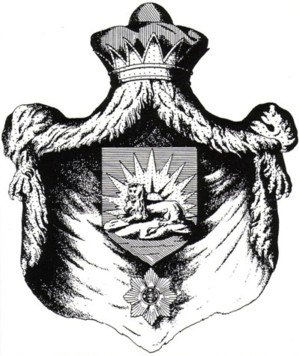
The Coat of Arms with mantle

== Genealogy ==
Field Marshal Prince Bahman Mirza Qajar was born 11 October 1810 at Tehran, and died 11 February 1884 at Shusha/Karabagh. He was the 4th son of Crown Prince Abbas Mirza "Nayeb os-Saltaneh" by Princess Naba'at (Jahan) Khanom Davalu, and younger full brother to Mohammad Shah Qajar. 1831–1834 he became Governor (hakem) of Ardabil, 1834 Governor of Tehran and Commander-in-Chief (sepah-salar), 1836–1841 Governor-General (beyglerbegi) of Borujerd, Lorestan and Hamadan, 1842–1847 Vicegerent (vali) of Azerbaijan and Governor of Tabriz.

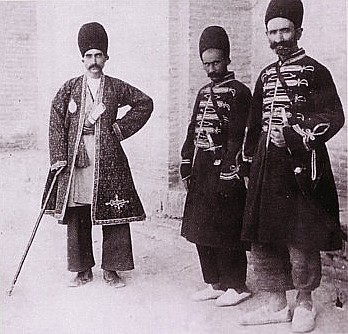
Prince Anoushiravan Mirza "Zia' od-Dowleh", governor of Tabriz with his guardsmen, 1881.

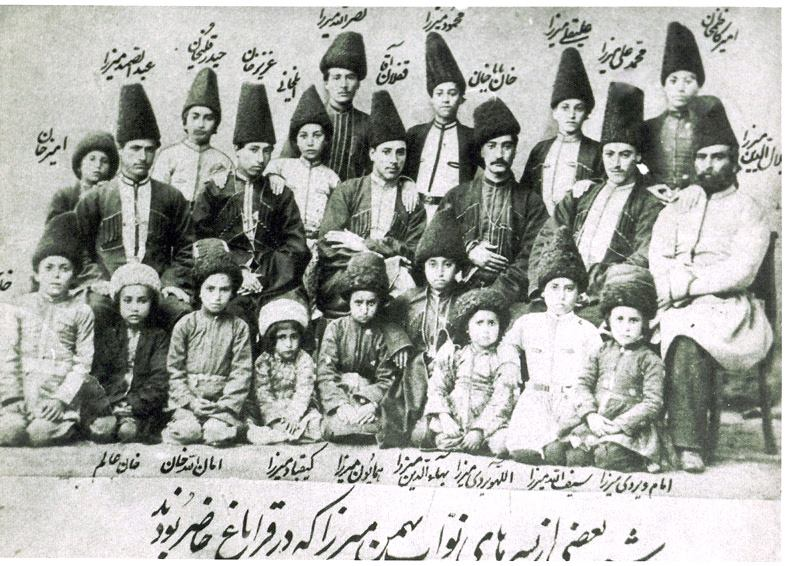
Bahman Mirza's senior sons at Shusha, Karabakh in 1869.

Bahman Mirza had 31 sons and 30 daughters. Some of them became ancestors of the Azerbaijani Qajar families: Persidsky, Bahmanov and Kadjar.

His 31 sons in order of seniority:

1. (by Malek Soltan Khanom) Prince Anoushiravan Mirza "Zia od-Dowleh" "Amir Touman" (b. 19 Aug 1833 in Ardabil, d. 23 Oct 1899 in Shusha, Karabagh), 1873 Governor of Turshiz, 1881–1882 Governor of Tabriz, 1884–1886 and 1898–1899 of Semnan, Damghan and Shahrud, 1888–1889 Governor von Borujerd and Lorestan. He married a. as his Galin Khanom Badie ol-Jamal Khanom, daughter of Mohammad Hassan Khan Sardar Iravani, b. he married a daughter of his maternal uncle Prince Amir Teymur Mirza Hessami-Qajar, son of Mohammad Taqi Mirza by the daughter of Hossein Khan Donboli, and issued:
  1. Princess Malekeh-Afagh Khanom (b. 1864 at Tabriz; d. 16 Oct 1918 at Teheran, bur. at the Shrine of Shah Abdol-Azim, Tehran), married ca. 1880 1rstly: Mirza Hossein (d. 1898 at Tehran) from the Behnam family, mostowfis of Azerbaijan; married 1898 2ndly: Amanollah Khan Zia' os-Soltan (d. 1931 at Hamburg) son of Safar Khan Donboli from the Khans of the Khoy Khanate. She had issued three sons and one daughter, mother of Ali Akbar Bahman and the Bahman Family.
  2. Princess Mah Manzar Khanom, married Mohammad Hossein Mirza Bahrami "Mo'ezz od-Dowleh", and had issued.
2. (by Malek Soltan Khanom) Prince Jalal od-Din Mirza (b. ca. 1836, d. 1870), honorary named Major-General in Persian army. He was Shafi Khan Qajar's father.
3. (by Malek Soltan Khanom) Prince Reza Qoli Mirza (b. 1837 in Iran; d. 1894 in St. Petersburg), General in Russian army. He had issued.
4. (by Shahzadeh Khanom) Prince Shahrokh Mirza (b. 15/09/1844 in Iran, d. 1915 in Baku), Colonel in Russian army. He had issued.
5. Prince Nasrollah Mirza (b. 1848), Colonel in Nizhny-Novgorod Dragoon regiment, returned to Iran. He had issued.
6. Prince Mohammad Ali Mirza "Sho’a os-Soltan" "Amir Touman" (b. 1849), Commander-in-Chief of the Persian Cossack division in Isfahan. He had issued.
7. (by Malek Jahan Khanom) Prince Khan Baba Khan Mirza (b. 1849; d. 1926), Colonel in Russian army. He had issued.
8. (by Mehr Farid Khanom) Prince Abdol Samed Mirza (b. 1851 at Tiflis; d. 1924 at Shusha), Colonel in Russian army. He had issued.
9. Prince Qoflan Agha Mirza (b. 1851).
10. Prince Aziz Khan Mirza (b. ca. 1851).
11. Prince Mahmoud Mirza (b. ca. 1853), General in Russian army. He had issued.
12. (by Mehr Farid Khanom) Prince Amir Kazem Mirza (b. 1853; d. 1920), Major-General in Russian army. He had issued.
13. (by Kuchek Barda Khanom) Prince Ali Qoli Mirza (b. 1854; d. 1905). He had issued.
14. Prince Baha od-Din Mirza (b. 20/7/1855).
15. Prince Heydar Qoli Mirza (b. 15/8/1855; d. 1918). He had issued.
16. (by Kuchek Barda Khanom) Prince Khan Jahan Mirza (b. ca. 1855), Colonel in Russian army.
17. (by Chichek Khanom) Prince Amanollah Mirza (b. 8/1/1857 in Shusha; d. 1937 in Tehran), Major-General in Russian army, Deputy-Commander in Azerbaijan army, returned to Iran and became instructor of the Persian army. He had issued.
18. Prince Ilkhani Mirza (b. 1858, d. 1901).
19. Prince Homayoun Mirza (b. 1860).
20. Prince Seyfollah Mirza (b. 6/3/1864; d. 1926), Colonel in Russian army. He had issued.
21. (by Mehr Farid Khanom) Prince Amirkhan Mirza (b. ca. 1864).
22. (by Kuchek Barda Khanom) Prince Imamverdi Mirza (b. ca. 1864), returned to Iran.
23. (by Kuchek Barda Khanom) Prince Khan Alam Mirza (b. ca. 1865). He had issued.
24. Prince Allahverdi Mirza (b. ca. 1866).
25. (by Kuchek Barda Khanom) Prince Keyqobad Mirza (1867–1923). He had issued, father of the Bahmanov family.
26. (by Chickek Khanom) Prince Qolam Shah Mirza (b. 1867; d. 1918).
27. (by Chichek Khanom) Prince Shah Qoli Mirza (b. 1871).
28. (by Chichek Khanom) Prince Mohammad Mirza a.k.a. Mamed Qoli Mirza (b. 1872; d. 1920), Major-General in Russian army. He had issued.
29. (by Kuchek Barda Khanom) Prince Ardashir Mirza (b. 1875).
30. Prince Seyf ol-Malek Mirza.
31. (by Khandan Khanom) Prince Sahebgharan Mirza, returned to Iran and became 1903 Chamberlain-in-Control of Muzaffar al-Din Shah. He had issued.

His daughters known by name in order of seniority:

1. (by Malek Soltan Khanom) Princess Mariyam Saltanat Khanom (b. 1836; d. 27/2/1866), married Begdad Bey Javanshir from the Khans of Kharabakh. She had issued one son, one daughter.
2. Princess Azari Homayoun Khanom "Shahzadeh Khanom" (b. ca. 1838), married 1861 Abol Fath Khan Ziyadkhanov (b. 1843) from the Qajar-Ziyadoghlu (Ziadlu) dynasty of Ganja. She had issued three sons and five daughters.
3. (by Shahzadeh Khanom) Princess Rowshandeh Soltan Khanom (b. ca. 1846), married Hajji Buyuk Murad Beyg Nuribekov (d. 1870). She had issued one son and one daughter.
4. Princess Qizikhanim Khanom "Tadj ol-Molouk" (b. 1847 in Tabriz), married Mohammad Qassem Agha Javanshir from the Khans of Kharabakh. She had issued.
5. Princess Sabiyeh Khanom, founder of the Nizamiyeh Pushkin Library in Ganja.
6. Princess Nawab Agha Khanom, married Ismail Khan.
7. Princess Malek-Sifagh Khanom.
8. (by Mehr Farid Khanom) Princess Zarri Khanom (b. 1864; d. 1943), married as his second wife, Karim Bey Mehmandarov (b. 1854; d. 1929). She had issued three sons and five daughters.
9. (by Mehr Farid Khanom) Princess Khorshid Khanom, married Zafar Ali Beyg Valibekov (b. 1861; d. 1902). She had issued one son and two daughters.
10. (by Mehr Farid Khanom) Princess Khanzadeh Khanom, married and had issued one daughter.
11. Princess Keykab Khanom.
12. (by Mehr Farid Khanom) Princess Abbaseh Khanom (b. 6/10/1865), married Reza Beyg Sadigbeyov, son of Sadegh Beyg. She had issued one son and three daughters.
13. Princess Noor Jahan Khanom (b. 1868; d. 1955), married 1890 Mostafa Bey Aghayev (d. 1921). She had issued one son and five daughters.
14. Princess Turan Khanom.
15. (by Kuchek Barda Khanom) Princess Ashraf Khanom, married Khahan Khan Nakchivanski (d. after 1920) from the Khans of Nakhichevan. She had issued.
16. (by Kuchek Barda Khanom) Princess Manzar Khanom, married Nasser Beyg Javanshir from the Khans of Kharabakh.
17. (by Kuchek Barda Khanom) Princess Bahdjat Khanom, married Nasser Beyg Javanshir from the Khans of Kharabakh. She had issued one daughter.
18. (by Kuchek Barda Khanom) Princess Noor al-Ain Khanom.
19. (by Kuchek Barda Khanom) Princess Firuzeh Khanom, married Feridoun Beyg. She had issued one daughter.
20. Princess Fakhr os-Soltan Khanom.
21. Princess Shahzdi Khanom, married Abol Fath Agha, son of Soleyman Agha, a descendant of the Sultans of Shamshadil, by his wife Saida Begum, a descendant of the Qajar-Ziyadoghlu (Ziadlu) dynasty of Ganja.

== Famous members ==
- Nizami Bahmanov
- Aleksander Reza Qoli Mirza Qajar
- Feyzullah Mirza Qajar
- Shafi Khan Qajar
- Ali Akbar Bahman

== Notes ==
- Eldar Ismayilov: A Persian Prince of the Qajar House in the Russian Empire, Moscow, 2009.
- Genghis Kadjar: The Kadjars, Baku, 2003.
- Mohammad Ali Bahmani-Qajar: Some Remarks about Prince Bahman Mirza Qajar, Tehran 2012.
- Arian K. Zarrinkafsch-Bahman, The Bahman-Qajar Ancestors
- Bahmani-Qajar (Kadjar)
