= Anoushiravan Mirza =

Iranian prince (1833–1899)

Anoushiravan Mirza Zia' od-Dowleh انوشیروان میرزا ضیاءالدوله
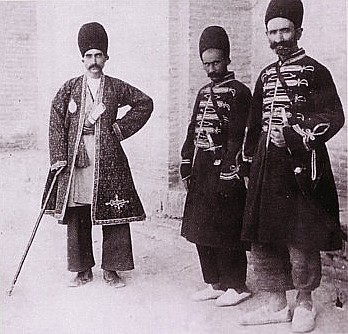
- Prince Anoushiravan Mirza (far left) with guard
- Born: 19 August 1833; Ardabil, Iran
- Died: 23 October 1899 (aged 66); Tabriz, Iran
- House: Bahmani
- Dynasty: Qajar
- Father: Bahman Mirza
- Mother: Malek Soltan Khanum
- Military career
- Service years: 1847–1899
- Rank: Brigardier General

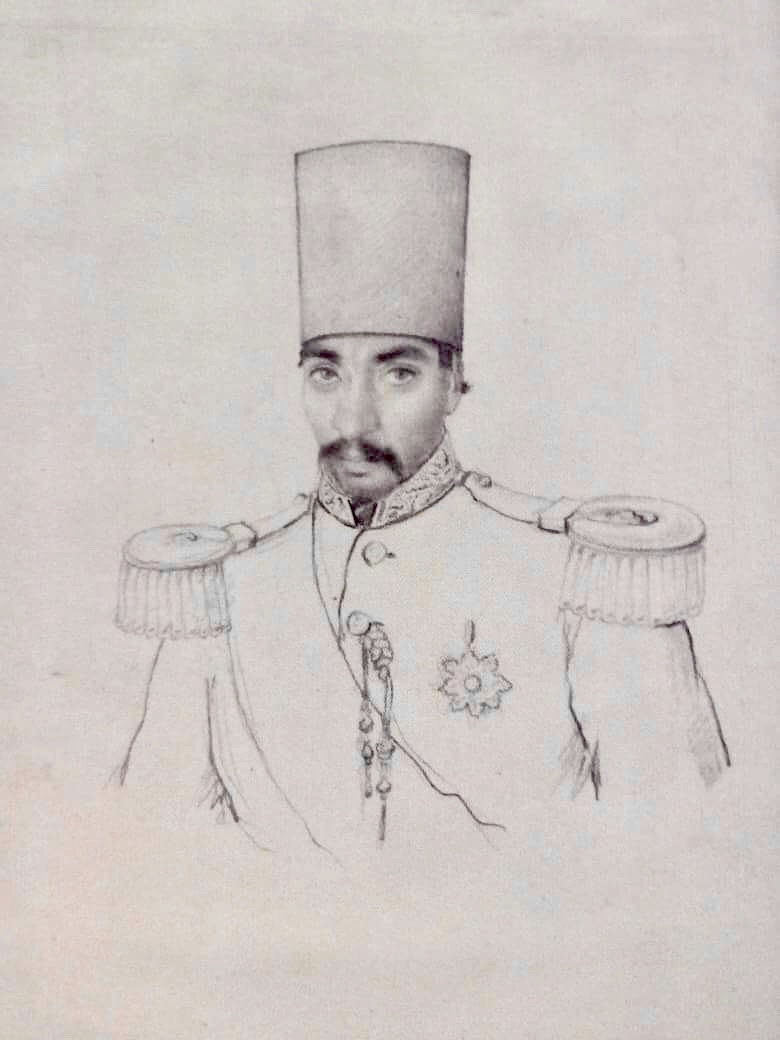
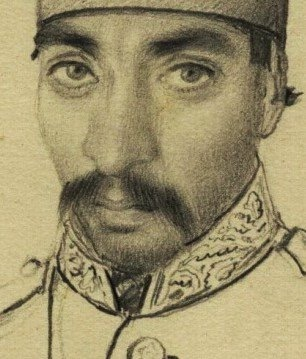
Prince Anoushiravan Mirza "Zia' od-Dowleh", drawing by Abu'l-Hasan Sani al-Mulk.

Prince Anoushiravan Mirza "Zia' od-Dowleh" "Amir Touman" (19 August 1833 – 23 October 1899) was an Iranian prince of the Qajar dynasty who served as a politician and governor.

== Life and career ==
Anoushiravan Mirza was born on 19 August 1833 in Ardabil, Iran, and died on 23 October 1899 in Tabriz after developing apoplexy and paralysis. He was at Shusha, Karabakh. He was the first-born and eldest son of Prince Bahman Mirza, the vali (governor-general) of Azerbaijan during the reign of Mohammad Shah Qajar. His mother was Bahman Mirza's first chief wife, Princess Malek Soltan Khanum daughter of Mohammad Taqi Mirza.

In 1848, Bahman Mirza fell out of favour at the court in Tehran and was exiled to Russia. His wives and children followed him to the Russian occupied Caucasus province of Karabakh. However, shortly after 1850, Anoushiravan Mirza moved back to Iran. In 1872, Bahman Mirza's cousin, Naser al-Din Shah Qajar, pardoned him. Therefore, Anoushiravan Mirza was finally rewarded with several governmental offices. In 1873, he became governor of Torshiz, 1878 governor of Talesh, later 1881–1882 governor of Tabriz, 1884–1886 and 1898–1899 of Semnan, Damghan and Shahrud, 1888–1889 governor of Borujerd and Lorestan. In 1891, he had the vizierate of the province of Kermanshah on behalf of the almighty governor and commander-in-chief of his time Hasan Ali Khan Garrusi. He also received the title of Zia' od-Dowleh (lit. 'Splendour of the State') - with which he became well-known - and the military rank of Amir Touman (lit. 'Commander of Ten Thousand', i.e. general) by Naser al-Din Shah.

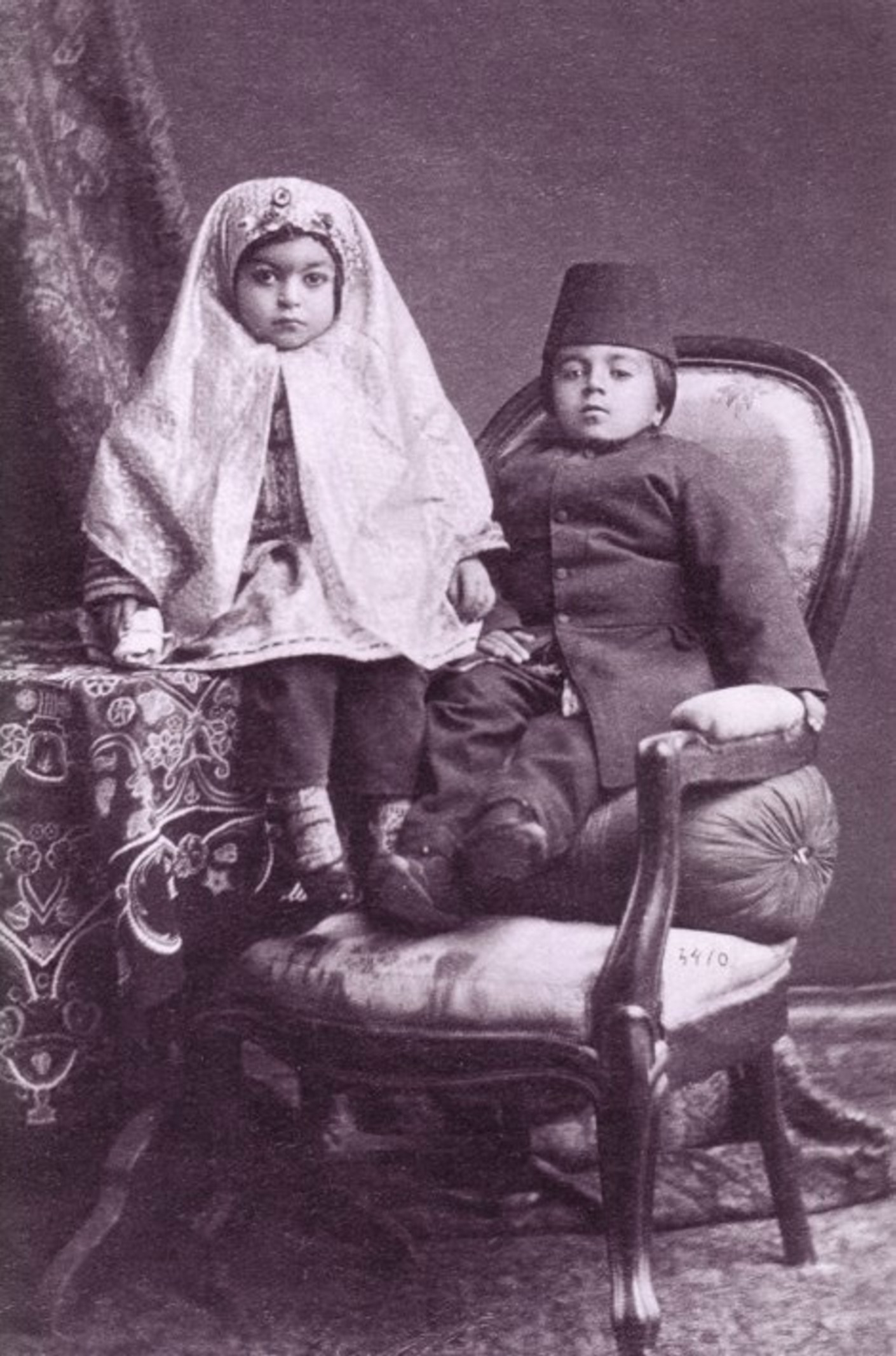
Anoushiravan Mirza's children: Princess Malekeh-Afagh Khanom and Prince Soltan Majid Mirza, Tiblis ca. 1870 by Dmitri Yermakov

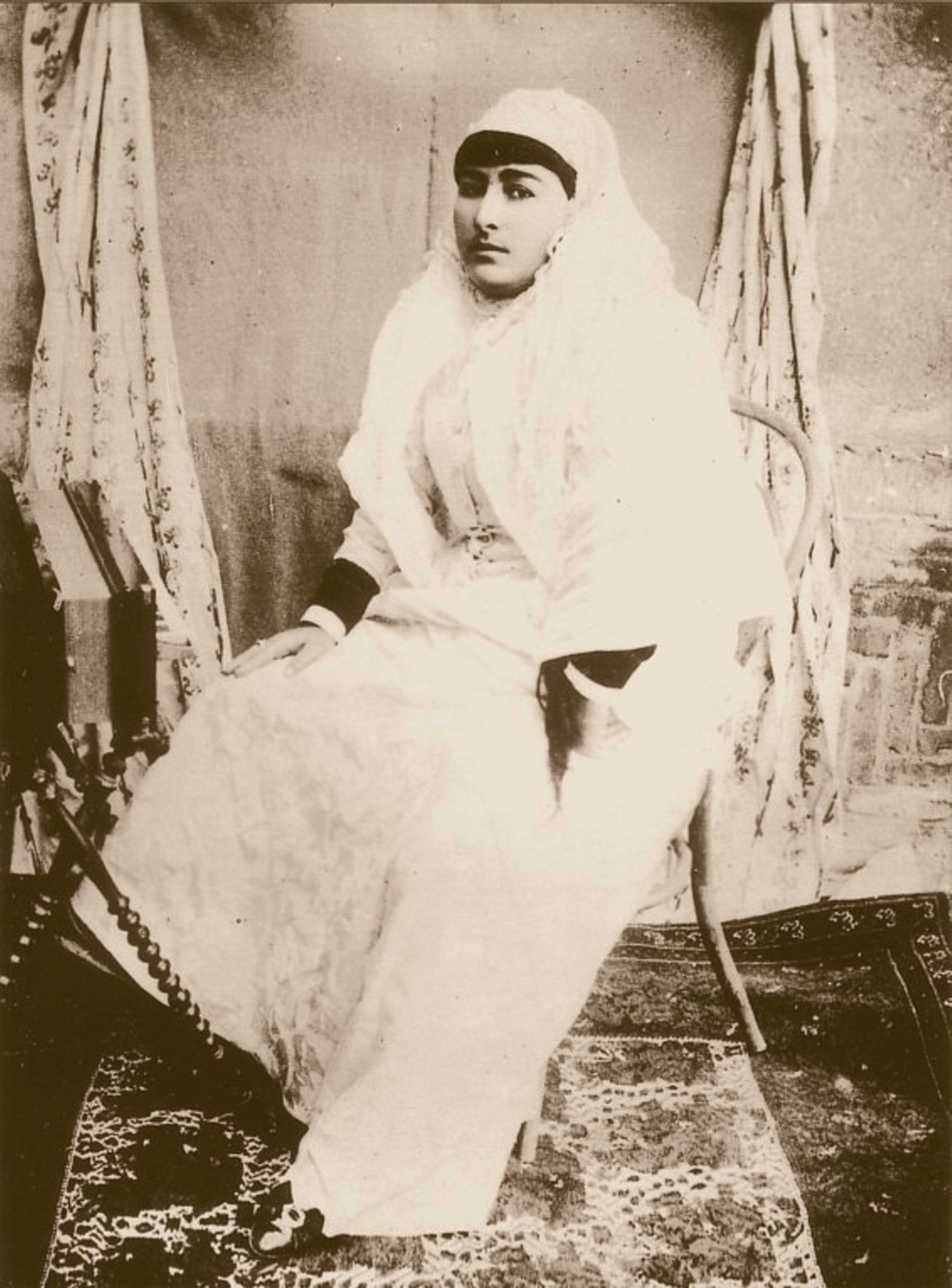
Princess Malekeh-Afagh Khanom by Antoin Sevruguin, ca. 1900

In 1887, Thomas Stevens wrote in his travel-diary Around the World on a Bicycle:

"Prince Anushirvan Mirza, Governor of Semnan, Damghan, and Shahrood, is the Shah's cousin, son of Baahman Mirza, uncle of the Shah, and formerly Governor of Tabreez. Baahman Mirza was discovered intriguing with the Russians, and, fearing the vengeance of the Shah, fled from the country; seeking an asylum among the Russians, he is now--if not dead--a refugee somewhere in the Caucasus. But the father's disgrace did not prejudice the Shah against his sons, and Prince Anushirvan and his sons are honored and trusted by the Shah as men capable of distinguishing between the friends and enemies of their country, and of conducting themselves accordingly. The Governor's palace is not far from the north gate of the city, and after the customary round of tea and kalians, without which nothing can be done in Persia, he walks outside with his staff to a piece of good road in order to see me ride to the best advantage. (As a specimen of Persian extravagance--to use a very mild term--it may be as well to mention here as anywhere, that the Governor telegraphed to his son, acting as his deputy at Shahrood, that he had ridden some miles with me out of the city!) During the evening one of the Governor's sons, Prince Sultan Madjid Mirza, comes in with a few leading dignitaries to spend an hour in chatting and smoking. This young prince proves one of the most intelligent Persians I have met in the country; besides being very well informed for a provincial Persian, he is bright and quick-witted..."

== Family and Offspring ==
In 1850, Prince Anoushiravan Mirza married his first and chief wife (Persian: Galin Khanum) his cousin Badie ol-Jamal Khanum, daughter of Mohammad Hassan Khan Iravani by Princess Mahrokhsar Khanom "Fakhr od-Dowleh" (full-sister of Bahman Mirza). Secondly he married the daughter of Prince Amir Teymur Mirza Hessami, son of Mohammad Taghi Mirza "Hessam os-Saltaneh". He issued two sons and two daughters:

- 1. Prince Soltan Ahmad Mirza, he had issued:
  - 1.1. Princess Benazir Khanom.
- 2. Prince Soltan Majid Mirza "Dar ol-Molk".
- 3. Princess Malekzadeh Khanom, she married Prince Shazdeh Mirza Bahrami "Sana' od-Dowleh" and issued:
  - 3.1. Princess Monavvareh Khanom, she had issued.
  - 3.2. Princess Moniere Khanom, she had issued.
- 4. Princess Malekeh Afagh Khanom Bahman, (b. 1864 in Tabriz, d. 26 Oct 1917 in Tehran), married ca. 1880 1rstly: Mirza Hossein Behnam; married 1898 2ndly: Amanollah Khan Zia' os-Soltan (d. 1931 in Hamburg) from the Donboli Khans of the Khoy Khanate. She had issued three sons and one daughter:
  - 4.1. Shahzadeh Ali Akbar Bahman (1880–1964), he had issued:
    - 4.1.1. Mehr-e Jahan Khanom Bahman.
  - 4.2. Ali Asghar Bahman, he had issued:
    - 4.2.1. Cyrus Bahman.
    - 4.2.2. Talieh ol-Afagh Khanom Bahman.
    - 4.2.3. Badie ol-Jamal Khanom II Bahman, who married into the Zarrinnaal family.
  - 4.3. Nosrat ol-Molouk Khanom Bahman (1899–1972), who married into the Zarrinnaal family and issued:
    - 4.3.1. Zarrin Rokh Zarrinkafsch-Bahman.
    - 4.3.2. Ali Zarrinpour Zarrinkafsch-Bahman.
    - 4.3.3. Abdol Hossein Amir Keywan Zarrinkafsch-Bahman.
    - 4.3.4. Abolreza Anoushiravan II (died 1939).
  - 4.4. Abolghassem Bahman (1902–1956).

== Sources ==
- Bahmani-Ghajar, Mohammad Ali (1998). Neveshtar-e Bahman Mirza. Tehran.
- Bamdad, Mehdi (1999). Sharh-e hal-e Rejal-e Iran, Vol. I. Tehran: Zavvar.
- Barjesteh van Waalwijk van Doorn (Khosrovani)/ Bahman Bayani, L.A. Ferydoun (2004). "The Fath Ali Shah Project", in: Qajar Studies. Journal of the International Qajar Studies Association, Volume IV. Rotterdam: Barjesteh van Waalwijk van Doorn.
- Ismayilov, Eldar (2009). A Persian Prince of the Qajar Royal House in the Russian Empire. Moskaw.
- Kadjar, Chingiz (2001). The Kadjars. Baku.
- Stevens, Thomas (1940). Around the World on a Bicycle. London.
