= Najaf Quli =

Najaf Quli (Azerbaijani: Nəcəfqulu; Persian: نجفقلی, romanized: Najafqoli) is a male given name built from quli.

== People ==
- Najaf Quli Khan
- Najaf-Qoli Khan Bakhtiari
- Najafqulu Khan I
- Najafqulu Khan II
- Najafqoli Khan Cherkes
- Najafgulu Ismayilov
- Najafgulu Rafiyev

== See also ==
- Najafqoli, Khuzestan
- Najaf Qoli, Lorestan
- Najaf Qoli Qeshlaqi, a village in Ardabil province
