= Ali Akbar Bahman =

Iranian diplomat (1883–1967)

- علی‌اکبر بهمن
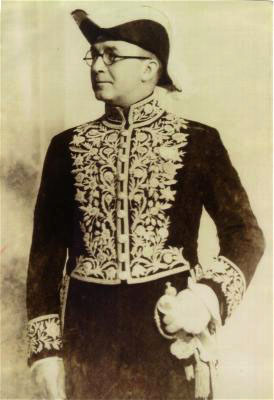
- Photograph of Ali Akbar Bahman, ca. 1930

Personal details
- Born: 1883 Tehran, Sublime State of Iran
- Died: 1967 (aged 83–84) Tehran, Imperial State of Iran
- Resting place: Shah Abdol-Azim Shrine
- Parent(s): Malekeh Afagh Khanom (mother); Mirza Hossein Behnam (father)

Ali Akbar Bahman (also Mirza Ali Akbar Khan; 1883 – 1967) was an Iranian diplomat and politician during the Qajar and Pahlavi eras.

== Family ==
Ali Akbar Bahman was a member of the famous Bahmani family. He was born in Tehran as Mirza Ali Akbar Khan in 1883, and died there in 1967. He descended from the family of Prince Bahman Mirza, son of Abbas Mirza. Bahman Mirza (1810–1884) was governor-general of Azerbaijan, and prince-regent for his ill brother Mohammad Shah Qajar and the infant crown prince Naser al-Din Mirza. After Bahman Mirza fell out of favour at court he went into exile to the Russian Caucasus.

His eldest son, Prince Anoushiravan Mirza (1833–1899), returned to Iran, and had a daughter called Princess Malekeh Afagh Khanom (1863 – 26 October 1917), Ali Akbar Bahman's mother. His father was Mirza Hossein Behnam from an aristocratic family from Tabriz, which served the royal house since the days of Fath-Ali Shah Qajar. Because of his father's early death in 1897 his mother married secondly Amanollah Khan Zia' os-Soltan from the Donboli family, her maternal cousin, who was a big landowner at Tabriz, and notable at court. His stepfather, a politician in the Iranian constitutional movement, encouraged young Ali Akbar in his career and introduced him to several political figures of that time like Yahya Dowlatabadi.

In 1931, when family names were mandated in Iran, Ali Akbar and his siblings Ali Asghar and Nosrat ol-Molouk Khanom named their family Bahman in honour of their grandfather Prince Bahman Mirza.

== Career ==
From noble birth with his mother a royal princess, the young Mirza Ali Akbar Khan had every chance to make a career at court. Thus, he was occupied in the administration service. His stepfather was a staunch opponent to absolutism and open to reforms, thus he supported the Constitutional Revolution of 1906. His companion, Yahya Dowlatabadi, a leading left-winged constitutional politician and reformist of the Iranian school system sent Mirza Ali Akbar Khan in 1907 to Russian Azerbaijan to teach at the Persian Sa'adat-School in Baku. There, a lot of Ali Akbar's relatives from his mother's family lived.

Following the Russian Revolution and the subsequent World War I, many Persians from the Caucasus tried to escape from the Red Army to Iran. With his family ties in Azerbaijan and Iran, Ali Akbar Bahman was able to help refugees cross the border. On 26 August 1919, Ali Akbar was appointed Envoy Extraordinary and Minister Plenipotentiary of Persia to Bucharest and then, in 1921, ambassador to Belgium. From 1934 to 1935, he was Iran's ambassador to Afghanistan and, in 1935, arranged the "Atabay Arbitration" (territorial exchanges between both countries in the Sistan-Zabulistan region).

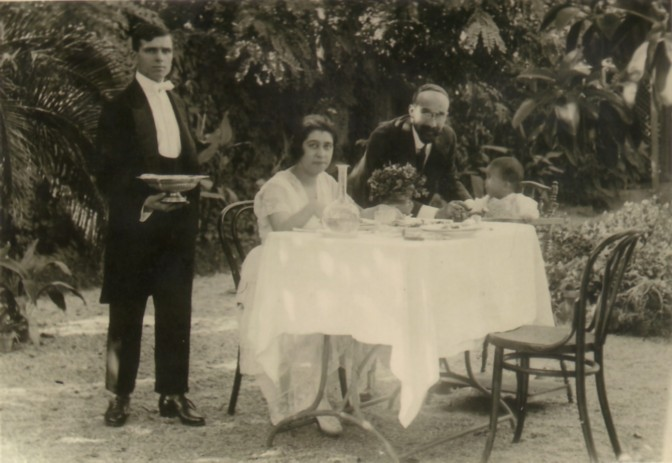
Ali Akbar Bahman with his wife and daughter as envoy to Bukarest, 1919.

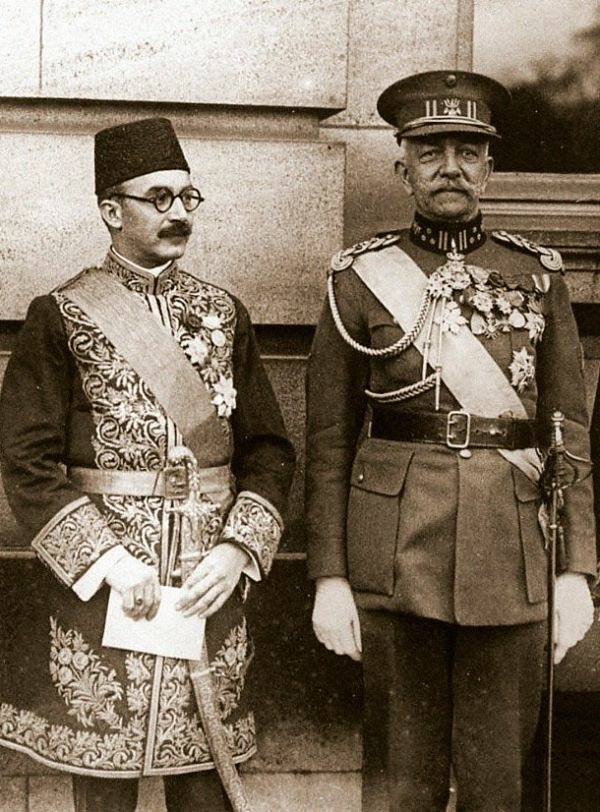
Ali Akbar Bahman, Persian Minister to Belgium with his letter of credentials in front of the Royal Palace at Brussels with General Albert Baron du Roy de Bliquy, Aide de Camp Honoraire of King Albert I of the Belges, 1921.

In 1935 he also became Minister of Transport and with seven other members of the cabinet responsible for the 1935 commemoration stamp set. Finally 1939–1942 he became ambassador to Egypt. There, he arranged the marriage of Mohammad Reza Pahlavi (at the time the Crown Prince of Iran) with Princess Fawzia, daughter of King Fuad I and sister of King Farouk on 16 March 1939 at Abdeen Palace in Cairo.

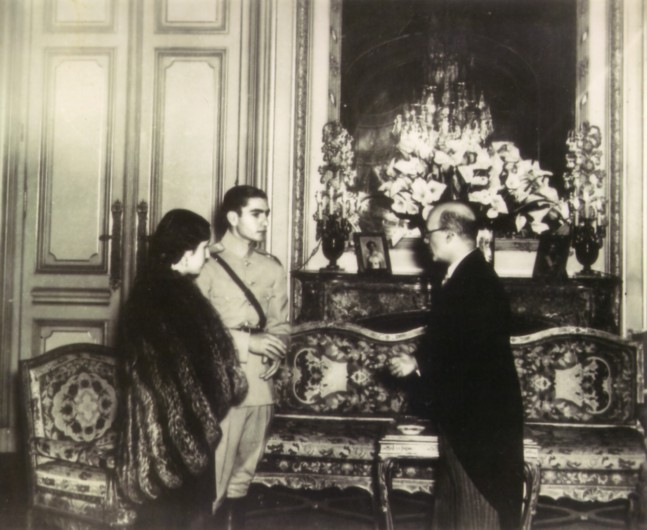
Ali Akbar Bahman as ambassador in Cairo receiving Mohammad Reza Pahlavi the crown prince of Iran and Princess Fowzieh bint Fouad of Egypt, March 1939.

Back in Iran from Egypt, where he also headed a gathering of Iranians at the embassy about Iranian Settlement in Egypt and participated in the Cairo Conference 1943, Ali Akbar Bahman became sometimes Minister for Trade 1944–1946. He bought the Gowharshad residence in Tehran and a huge garden area of Bagh-e Mostowfi, in the city's cosy north at the slopes of Alburz Mountains. Ali Akbar Bahman died in 1967 and was buried next to his mother's mausoleum at Shah Abdol-Azim Shrine, Tehran.

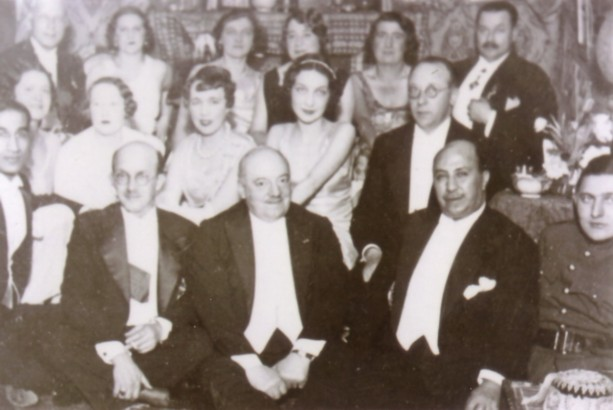
Ali Akbar Bahman at the Cairo Conference, 1943.

Ali Akbar Bahman married Zoleykha Khanom Gadjieva and issued one daughter, Mehr-e Jahan (Mehri) Khanom Bahman.

== Bibliography ==
- 'Aqeli, Baqer: "Ali Akbar Batman, in: Sharhe-e hal-e rejal-e siyassi va nezami-ye mo'asser-e Iran (Biography of the contemporary dignitaries of policy and military in Iran), Vol. I, Nashr-e goftar, Tehran 2001, pp. 325-326.
- Clayton, Sir Gilbert: An Arabian Dictionary, edit. by Robert O. Collins, University of California Press, Berkeley and Los Angeles 1969.
- Devos, Bianca; Werner, Christoph. Culture and Cultural Politics under Reza Shah: The Pahlavi State, New Bourgeoisie and the Creation of a Modern Society in Iran. Iranian Studies, Routledge, New York 2014.
- Kadjar, Soltan Ali Mirza: "Mohammad Ali Shah: The Man and the King", in: Qajar Studies, Vol VII, Barjesteh van Waalwijk van Doorn, Rotterdam 2007, pp. 177–195.
- Kasravi, Ahmad: Tarikh-e Mashruteh-ye Iran (History of the Constitutional Revolution in Iran), Vol. I, Amir Kabir, Tehran 2537 imperial calendar.
