= Sarab Khanate =

Kurdish khanate

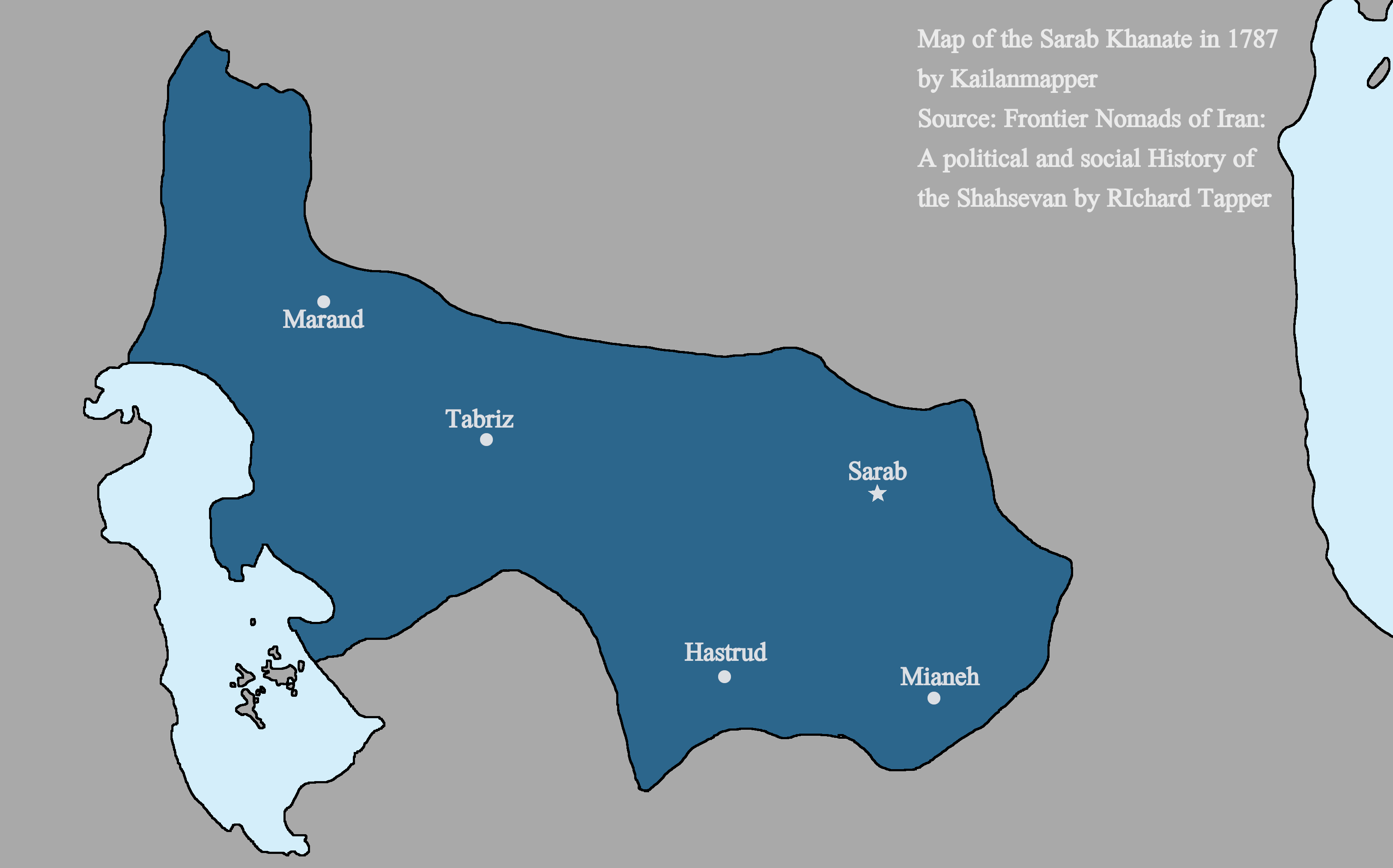
Map of the Sarab Khanate

The Sarab Khanate (Persian: خانات سراب) was a khanate centered around Sarab from 1747 and ruled by the Kurdish Shaqaqi tribe.

== History ==
=== Rise of the Khanate ===
With the collapse of the Safavid Empire in 1722, the Caucasian provinces were thrown into chaos. The Ottomans and Russians seized this opportunity to invade, with Peter the Great invading in the summer of 1722 and capturing Derbent. The Ottomans invaded in the summer of 1723, and had taken all of Persia's caucasian provinces by 1725. However, the tribal groups of Azerbaijan resisted heavily.

In the spring of 1726 the Shahsevan of Moghan and Shaqaqi of Meshkin rose against the Ottomans in anger at their occupation of Ardabil under the leadership of 'Abd ar-Razzaq Khan, the governor of Karadagh. In May, an Ottoman force left Ardabil under the command of 'Abd ar-Rahman Pasha and defeated the tribesmen in Arshaq. In October 1728, the governor of Diyarbakir defeated the Shaqaqi in Meshkin and took their women and children captive. The Ottomans eventually crushed the rebels by January 1729. However, the Safavid Restoration and Tahmasp Qoli Khan's campaign left them no room to consolidate their hold on Azerbaijan. By 1732 Moghan was back under Iranian control.

During the reign of the Afsharids, Nader Shah deported many of the Shaqaqi to Khorasan; however upon his assassination in June 1747, the Shaqaqi migrated back to Azerbaijan. Instead of resettling at Meshkin they chose to settle at Sarab and Mianeh, as during their absence Meshkin was taken by the Shahsevan.

=== Reign of Ali Khan Shaqaqi ===
The Khanate was founded by Ali Khan, the leader of the Kurdish Shaqaqi tribe, after 1747. In 1750, Ali Khan was defeated by Azad Khan Afghan and forced to submit. In the spring of 1762, Karim Khan Zand invaded Azerbaijan to force Fath-Ali Khan Afshar and his Urmia Khanate to submit. Ali Khan Shaqaqi submitted and supplied the Zand army. Karim Khan would capture Tabriz and capture Urmia on 20 February 1763 after a seven month siege. Under Ali Khan's rule, the khanate had an alliance with the neighboring Ardabil Khanate and the Karabakh Khanate.

=== Reign of Sadiq Khan Shaqaqi ===
When Ali Khan Shaqaqi died in 1786, he was succeeded by Sadiq Khan Shaqaqi. In 1787, Sadiq took Tabriz and killed the governor, Khoda-dad Khan Donboli. His followers also launched raids in Gilan. When Agha Mohammad Khan Qajar invaded Azerbaijan in early 1791, Sadiq retreated from Tabriz to defend Sarab, but he was defeated and the Iranian armies ravaged Sarab and the surrounding countryside. Sadiq was then taken hostage, along with some Shahsevan chiefs of Ardabil.

==== Revolt against Iran ====
When Agha Mohammad Shah invaded Karabakh in June 1797, he crossed the Aras River with Sadiq Khan Shaqaqi and entered Shusha, where the Qajar was assassinated on 16 June. Sadiq was suspected of being involved in the plot, as the assassins handed the crown jewels and royal insignia to him. The camp at the city was broken up and Sadiq quickly moved to cross the Aras River and secured his control over most of Iranian Azerbaijan. He attacked Qazvin with an army of 15,000 tribesmen. In the chaos that ensued, Baba Khan, the governor of Shiraz, marched to Tehran and secured the city. He marched against the Shaqaqis and forced him to retreat to Sarab, where Sadiq surrendered. He was pardoned and reappointed as governor of Sarab. Fath-Ali Shah Qajar married Sadeq Khan's daughter as his 13th wife. However, in 1798 he revolted again. The rebellion was suppressed and in 1800 he was taken to Tehran and imprisoned in the Golestan Palace. His brother San Khan succeeded him as governor of Sarab.

== Khans of Sarab ==
- Ali Khan Shaqaqi 1747–1786
- Sadiq Khan Shaqaqi 1786–1800
- San Khan 1800–?

== See also ==
- Khoy Khanate

== Sources ==
- Tapper, Richard (2010), "Shahsevan", Encyclopedia Iranica
- Tapper, Richard (1997), Frontier Nomads of Iran: A Political and Social History of the Shahsevan, Cambridge University Press, ISBN 9780521583367
