= Najafqulu Khan II =

- Khan of Tabriz
- Reign: 1784–1786
- Predecessor: Najafqulu Khan I
- Successor: Jafarqulu Khan Donboli
- Born: Khoy, Azerbaijan, Persia
- Died: Tabriz, Azerbaijan, Persia
- Dynasty: Afsharid dynasty
- Religion: Islam

Najafqulu Khan II was the Second khan of the Tabriz Khanate from 1784 to 1786.

| Preceded by Najafqulu Khan I | Khan of Tabriz; 1784–1786 | Succeeded by Jafarqulu Khan Donboli |
