= Hosayn Qoli Donboli =

Khan of Khoy

Khan of Khoy
- In office 1786–1798
- Monarch: Agha Mohammad Khan Qajar
- Preceded by: Ahmad Khan Donboli
- Succeeded by: Jafar Qoli Khan Donboli

Personal details
- Died: 1798
- Parent: Ahmad Khan Donboli (father)
- Tribe: Donboli

Hosayn Qoli Donboli (Persian: حسین‌قلی دنبلی) was the third khan of the Khoy Khanate from 1786 to 1798.

== Sources ==
- Bournoutian, George (2021). From the Kur to the Aras: A Military History of Russia's Move into the South Caucasus and the First Russo-Iranian War, 1801–1813. Brill. ISBN 978-90-04-44515-4.
- Dawud, Ali Al-e; Oberling, Pierre (1995). "Donbolī". In Yarshater, Ehsan (ed.). Encyclopædia Iranica. Vol. VII/5: Divorce IV–Drugs. London and New York: Routledge & Kegan Paul. pp. 492–495. ISBN 978-1-56859-023-3.
- Gledhill, Kevin (2022). "Khoy (Ḵoy)". In Yarshater, Ehsan (ed.). Encyclopædia Iranica (Online ed.). Encyclopædia Iranica Foundation.
