= Gamar Sheyda =

Azerbaijani poet (1881-1933)

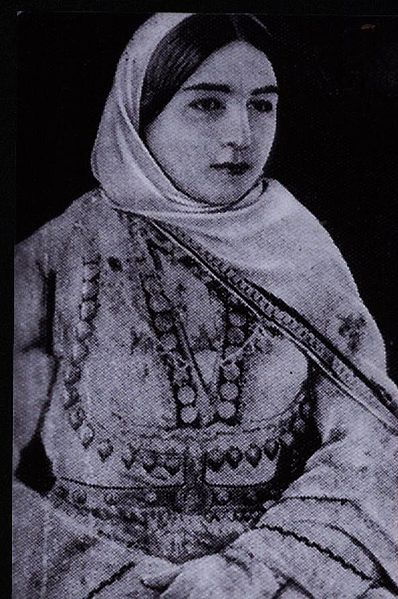
- Born: Qəmərnisə bəyim Ata xan qızı Əbraxanova; 1881; Shusha
- Died: April 15, 1933 (aged 51–52); Baku
- Occupations: Poet; playwright

Gamar Sheyda (Azerbaijani: Qəmər bəyim Şeyda, Russian: Гамэр-бейим Шейда) (1881–1933) was a poet and playwright from Azerbaijan.

== Biography ==
Gamar Sheyda was born in Shusha in 1881 as Gamarnisa to Ata Khan Abrakhanov (1827-1885) and Boyuk Khanum Javanshir (? - c.1910). Ata Khan died when his daughter was young and she was brought up by her older brother, Mohammed, who organised a teacher for his sister at home, and then later encouraged her to go to Shusha School for secondary education. As a teenager, she was presented to the poet Khurshidbanu Natavan at a Majlisi-uns (poetic assembly), who recognised her talent and gave her they nickname "Sheyda" which she adopted. Natavan's poetry was a strong influence on Sheyda.

Sheyda was married to Sadig bey Vazirov. They had six children: two sons - Bahadur bey and Nadir bey; four daughters - Leyla khanum, Sanuber khanum, Hamida khanum and Antiga khanum.

Sheyda died in Baku in 1933. It is reported that at her death Sheyda left many manuscripts, however only a few have survived.

== Writing ==
Sheyda was a poet and was particularly well-known for writing ghazals. She was part of a wide poetic network in Azerbaijan and exchanged idea and poems with the writer Ziba Ardabili.

Sheyda also wrote plays and the manuscript of the "Flood of Oppression" (Azerbaijani: Zülmün Daşqını), written in 1918, is kept at the Institute of Manuscripts of the Azerbaijan National Academy of Sciences, as well as a copy of her ghazal Agan Jany.

== Legacy ==
Sheyda and other female poets from the Majilisi-uns group were chosen as inspiration for a project celebrating women from Azerbaijan in 2018. This exhibition was organised as part of the programme celebrating the centenary of the Republic of Azerbaijan.

== Ancestry ==
Ancestors of Gamar beyim Sheyda

16. Sahbaz Khan Donboli
8. Jafar Qoli Khan Donboli
4. Abra Khan (d. 1846)
18. Pasha of Bayezid
9. Sharafnisa Begüm
2. Ata Khan Abrakhanov (1827-1885)
20. Panah Ali Khan
10. Ibrahim Khalil Khan
5. Azad Begüm (d. 1847)
11. A daughter of Mirza Rabi
1. Gamar Sheyda
24. Ibrahim Khalil Khan
12. Muhammadqasim agha Javanshir (1786-1844)
6. Najafqoli agha Javanshir
3. Boyuk Khanum Javanshir (? - c.1910)
