= Gövhər ağa =

Gövhər ağa (c. 1790 – 1888) was one of the wives of Jafar Qoli Khan Donboli, khan of the Khoy Khanate and Khan of Shaki.

She was born to Ibrahim Khalil Khan. She was given by her father in marriage in 1806, after which her brother was given an office by her husband. They had no children. She maintained a secret love correspondence with her husband's young male secretary, Mirza Ali. When their correspondence was discovered, he was executed. When she was widowed in 1814 she returned to live with her brother. She remarried, to Khankishi Bey. She was renowned for her reputed beauty, and the subject of many poems. As a widow she became a well-known philanthropist.
