= Sohrab Khan Gorji =

Sohrab Khan Gorji may refer to:

- Sohrab Khan Gorji (Georgian general), 18th-century Georgian noble and a general of the Georgian army
- Sohrab Khan Gorji (Iranian commander), 19th-century Iranian commander and chief of staff in the Qajar era
- Sohrab Khan Gorji (Iranian treasurer), 19th-century Iranian courtier, treasurer, and chief of customs in the Qajar era
