= Ahmad Khan Donboli =

Khoy Khanate from 1763 to 1786

Khan of Khoy
- In office 1763–1786
- Monarch: Karim Khan Zand
- Preceded by: Shahbaz Khan Donboli
- Succeeded by: Hosayn Qoli Donboli

Personal details
- Died: 1786
- Children: Hosayn Qoli Donboli
- Tribe: Donboli

Ahmad Khan Donboli (Persian: احمد خان دنبلی) was the second khan of the Khoy Khanate from 1763 to 1786.

== Sources ==
- Bournoutian, George (2021). From the Kur to the Aras: A Military History of Russia's Move into the South Caucasus and the First Russo-Iranian War, 1801–1813. Brill. ISBN 978-90-04-44515-4.
- Dawud, Ali Al-e; Oberling, Pierre (1995). "Donbolī". In Yarshater, Ehsan (ed.). Encyclopædia Iranica. Vol. VII/5: Divorce IV–Drugs. London and New York: Routledge & Kegan Paul. pp. 492–495. ISBN 978-1-56859-023-3.
- Gledhill, Kevin (2022). "Khoy (Ḵoy)". In Yarshater, Ehsan (ed.). Encyclopædia Iranica (Online ed.). Encyclopædia Iranica Foundation.

Preceded by Shahbaz Khan Donboli	Khan of Khoy; 1763–1786	Succeeded by Hosayn Qoli Donboli
