= Najafqulu Khan I =

- Khan of Tabriz
- Reign: 1747–1784
- Successor: Najafqulu Khan II
- Born: c. 1696; Abiward, Greater Khorasan, Persia
- Died: 1748; Tabriz, Azerbaijan, Persia
- Dynasty: Afsharid dynasty
- Religion: Shia Islam

Najafqulu Khan I (c. 1696–1748) was the first khan of the Tabriz Khanate from 1747 to 1784.

Preceded by	Khan of Tabriz; 1747–1784	Succeeded by Najafqulu Khan II
