= Ali Khan Shaqaqi =

- Khan of Sarab
- Reign: 1747 – 1786
- Successor: Sadiq Khan Shaqaqi
- Religion: Islam

Ali Khan Shaqaqi was the first khan of the Sarab Khanate from 1747 to 1786.

| Preceded by | Khan of Sarab; 1747—1786 | Succeeded by Sadiq Khan Shaqaqi |
