= Mohammad Taqi Mirza =

Iranian prince of the Qajar dynasty (1791–1853)

- Hessam os-Saltaneh
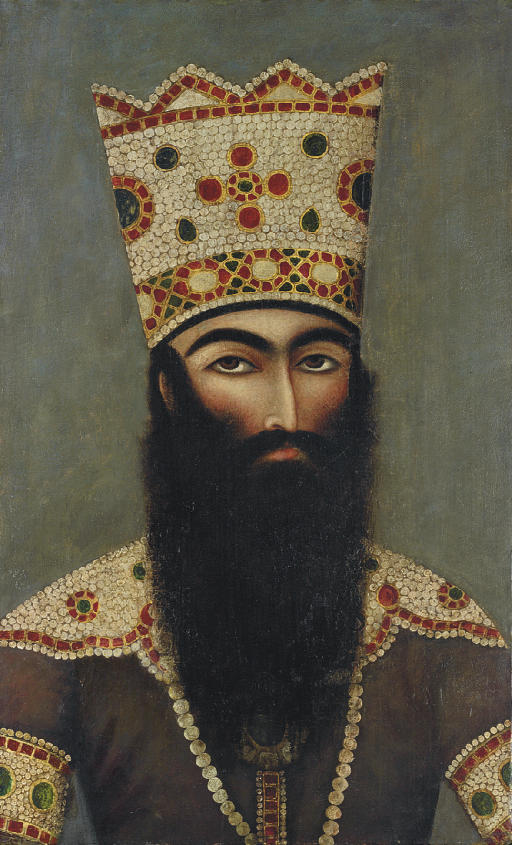
- Portrait by Mihr 'Ali, c. 1815

Governor of Kermanshah
- Tenure: 1826–1829
- Predecessor: Mohammad-Hossein Mirza
- Successor: Tahmasp Mirza

Governor of Borujerd
- Tenure: 1831–1834
- Born: 5 October 1791; Tehran
- Died: 1853 (aged 61–62)
- Dynasty: Qajar
- Father: Fath Ali Shah Qajar
- Mother: Zeynab Khanom
- Religion: Twelver Shia Islam

Mohammad Taqi Mirza Hessam os-Saltaneh (Persian: محمدتقی‌میرزا حسام‌السلطنه; 5 October 1791 – 1853) was an Iranian prince of the Qajar dynasty, son of Fath-Ali Shah Qajar. He was Governor-General (beglerbegi) of Kermanshah and of Borujerd.

== Life ==
Mohammad Taqi Mirza was born on 5 October 1791 in Tehran as Fath-Ali Shah's 7th son by the latter's temporary (sighe) wife Zeynab Khanom, daughter of Ali Mardan Khan Bakhtiari, supreme chief of the Chahar Lang division of the Bakhtiari tribe. Thus, he was one of the shah's twelve senior sons attending the official receptions at court depicted in several portraits. His only full sister was Princess Maryam Khanom (Fath-Ali Shah's 5th daughter).

In 1818, he commanded the attack on the Castle of Shirvan and his father, the shah, entitled him Hessam os-Saltaneh (lit. 'Saber of the Sultanate'). After his eldest brother Mohammad-Ali Mirza Dowlatshah, the governor-general of Kermanshah, died from cholera in 1823, Mohammad Taqi Mirza was made governor of that province in 1826–1829. In 1831–1834, he was made governor of Boroujerd. At his father's death in 1834, he was with some brothers imprisoned in the Ardabil citadel by the prime minister to avoid any attempts against the succession of the princes' nephew Mohammad Shah Qajar. He was released in 1848 by the next Qajar ruler Naser al-Din Shah. Mohammad Taqi Mirza was also a poet under the pen name "Shokat".

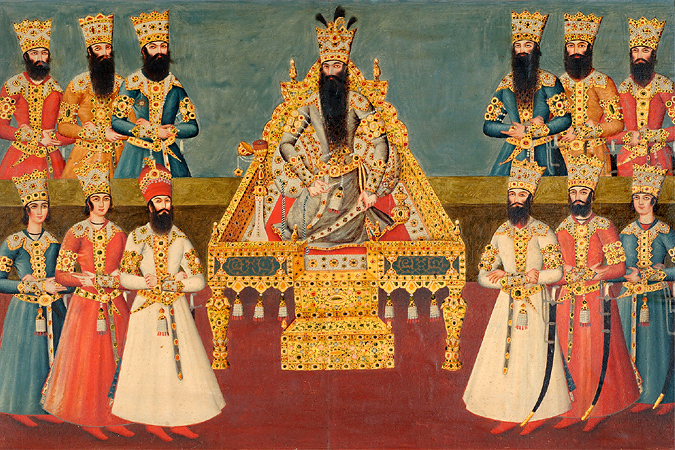
Fath-Ali Shah enthroned on the Peacock Throne with his twelve senior sons. At the shah's left hand side, upper row, third person is Mohammad Taqi Mirza.

== Family ==
=== Marriages ===
Mohammad Taqi Mirza married five wives:

- His first wife was the daughter of Hajji Mirza Ebrahim Khan "Mirza Shafi", sometimes prime minister to Fath-Ali Shah.
- His chief and most prominent wife according to tribal customs of the Qajar house (Galin Khanom) was a daughter of Hossein Qoli Khan Donboli, the Khan of Khoy Khanate.
- A Turkmen lady
- Daughter of Mirza Ahmad Khalifeh Soltani.
- Khorshid Khanum, the daughter of Sohrab Khan Gorji (Georgian general)

=== Offspring ===
==== Sons ====
- Abolfath Mirza
- Shoja ol-Molk Mirza
- Aurangzeb Mirza "Zibul 'Ulama"
- Abusaid Mirza
- Tahmoures Mirza
- Amir Teymur Mirza, his daughter married her cousin Prince Anoushiravan Mirza "Zia' od-Dowleh" eldest son of Bahman Mirza.
- Mohammad Safi Mirza
- Alamgir Mirza
- Jalal od-Din Mirza
- Sanjar Mirza
- Darab Mirza
- Amir Sheikh Mirza
- Eshaq Mirza
- Kamran Mirza
- Habib Allah Mirza ( ? – oct. 1908, assassinated in Sari by Khalatbari rebels)
- Amir Hossein Mirza
- Mohammad Hashem Mirza (Moeen-O-Tolieh; c.1846–c.1919); mother: Khorshid Khanum
- Abolhassan Mirza (Sheikh Reis Qajar; 1848–1921); mother: Khorshid Khanum
- Haidar Mirza
- Ali Morad Mirza

==== Daughters ====
- Jahan Soltan Khanom, married her paternal cousin Prince Badi os-Zaman Mirza and had issued.
- Malek Soltan Khanom, married her paternal cousin Prince Bahman Mirza son of crown prince Abbas Mirza and had issued.

== Sources ==
- Azod al-Dawleh, Soltan Ahmad Mirza (2014). Tarikh-e Azodi: Life at the Court of the Early Qajar Shahs, transl. by M. Eskandari-Qajar. Washington DC: Mage Publishers.
- Barjesteh van Waalwijk van Doorn, Fereydoun (2004). Qajar Studies - Journal of the International Qajar Studies Association, Vol IV: "The Fath Ali Shah Project", pp. 165-213. Rotterdam: Barjesteh van Waalwijk van Doorn.
- Eskandari-Qajar, Manouchehr M. (2008). Qajar Studies - Journal of the International Qajar Studies Association, Vol VIII: "The Message of the Negarestan Mural of Fath Ali Shah and His Sons: Snapshot of Court Protocol or Determination of Dynastic Succession", pp 17-41. Rotterdam: Barjesteh van Waalwijk van Doorn.
- Sheikh-O-Raees Qajar, Abol-Hassan Mirza (1894). منتخب النفیس [The Valuable Selection] (in Persian). Matba Naseri.
