= Mohammad Hassan Khan Iravani =

Iranian political figure (d. 1855)

Mohammad Hassan Khan Sardar Iravani (Persian: محمدحسن خان سردار ایروانی; died 30 August 1855), originally Mohammad Hassan Khan Qajar-Ziyadlu 'Sardar-e Iravan', was a Qajar notable and political figure in 19th century Iran during the reigns of Mohammad Shah Qajar and Naser al-Din Shah Qajar.

== Life ==
Born as the eldest son and heir of the formerly hereditary ruler of the khanate of Iravan, Mohammad Khan Qajar-Ziyadlu, from a cadet branch of the Qajar dynasty of Iran, Mohammad Hassan Khan moved from the Caucasus to Tehran, was married there to Princess Mahrokhsar Khanom "Fakhr od-Dowleh", daughter of Crown Prince Abbas Mirza and sister of the future Mohammad Shah, and got important governmental posts.

== Offspring ==
- Abdulah Khan Iravani
- Yusef Khan Sartip
- Abdol Hossein Khan "Fakhr ol-Molk"
- Abol Fath Khan "Sarem od-Dowleh"
- Badie ol-Jamal Khanom I, married her maternal cousin Anoushiravan Mirza, eldest son of Bahman Mirza.

== Sources ==
- The Qajar dynasty pages: Children of Nasser-ed-Din Shah Qajar (Kadjar).
- Bamdad, Mehdi (1999). Sharh-e hal-e Rejal-e Iran. Tehran: Zavvar.
- Barjesteh van Waalwijk van Doorn (Khosrovani)/ Bahman Bayani, L.A. Ferydoun (2004). "The Fath Ali Shah Project", in: Qajar Studies. Journal of the International Qajar Studies Association, Volume IV. Rotterdam: Barjesteh van Waalwijk van Doorn.
- The Treasure Map to the Forgotten Epoch of the Iravan Khanate
