= Tabriz Khanate =

Historic Khanate, located in Iranian Azerbaijan

Tabriz Khanate خانات تبریز
- 1757–1799
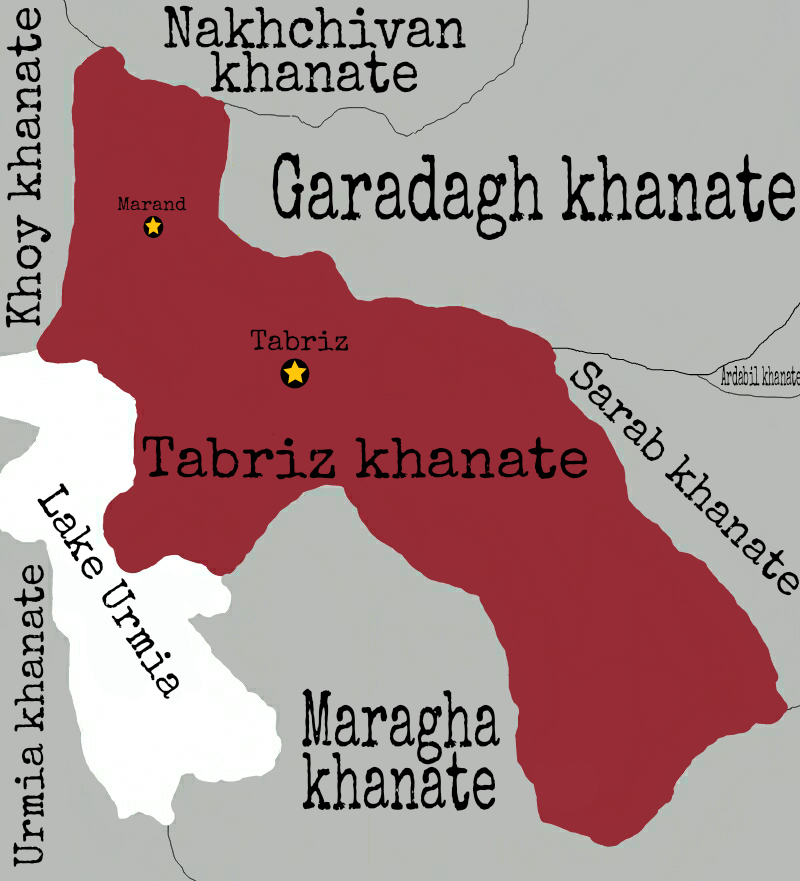
- Status: Khanate
- Capital: Tabriz
- Common languages: Persian; Azerbaijani
- Religion: Shia Islam
- History
  - Established: 1757
  - Independence from Azad Khan Afghan: 1757
  - Disestablished: 1799
Preceded by	Succeeded by
Afsharid Iran	Qajar Iran
- Today part of: Iran

The Tabriz Khanate (Persian: خانات تبریز) was one of the Khanates of Azerbaijan from 1757 to 1799, centered around Tabriz and led by members of the Turkified Kurdish Donboli tribe.

== History ==
=== Founding ===
Until the end of the Safavid era, the city of Tabriz and the surrounding regions belonged to Iran and was the capital of the province (beglarbegi) of Azerbaijan. The first khan of Tabriz, Najaf Qoli Khan, had entered the service of Nader Shah after he took Khoy from the Ottomans in 1734. He would accompany many of Nader Shah's later expeditions.

After Nader Shah's death, his empire was divided among his heirs, former Afsharid generals, and local militias and tribes. With the war of succession between the Qajar and Zand princes for the throne of Iran, the Donboli lords of Khoy and Salmas established their rule in Tabriz and extended their influence over the whole province. Azad Khan Afghan, a Pashtun warlord got Azerbaijan. Tabriz became the capital of Najaf Qoli Khan's kingdom with Fath-Ali Khan Afshar as his deputy. Najaf Qoli Khan kept his rank as Amir al-Omara.

=== Zand era ===
Najaf Qoli Khan and the Donbolis in general defected to Mohammad Hasan Khan Qajar during his invasion of Azerbaijan in 1757, and as a result they were able to put Tabriz under their control. Later they pledged allegiance to Karim Khan Zand during his invasion in 1763. In 1769, Najaf Qoli Khan was appointed governor of Tabriz by Karim Khan Zand. He kept Zand's control over Azerbaijan unusually firm.

After Karim Khan Zand's death in 1779, Sadiq Khan Shaqaqi and his Sarab Khanate, conquered Tabriz in 1787 and killed Khodadad Khan. Agha Mohammad Khan Qajar's invasion of Azerbaijan in 1791, destroyed the Sarab Khanate, who gave Tabriz back to the Donbolis. In 1796, Agha Mohammad Khan was proclaimed as shahanshah and emperor of all of Iran. Upon his death in 1797, Sadiq Khan Shaqaqi revolted against the new Iranian ruler, Fath-Ali, and attempted to seize the lands of the Donboli, but was repulsed.

=== Fall of the Khanate ===
He was pardoned but revolted again in 1798 when Jafar Khan Donboli was appointed governor of Tabriz. They eventually allied themselves against the Qajars along with the Afshars of Urmia. Fath-Ali Khan Qajar heard of the news in Dh'ul Qadah 1212 (April–May 1798) and made a farman to discourage the elites of Tabriz from supporting the alliance. Iranian forces eventually moved into Azerbaijan, captured Urmia on 20 June and on 1 July moved towards Salmas and Khoy and deposed Jafar Qoli Khan. By then, Fath-Ali Shah had enough of Sadiq, and had him walled up and killed in the Golestan Palace in 1800.

When Hossein Qoli Khan died in 1799, Jafar returned to Khoy with the support of the elders and asked Fath-Ali Shah to confirm his position as governor of Khoy. Fath-Ali Shah refused and sent his son Abbas Mirza to deal with the Donbolis. In June Abbas Mirza entered Tabriz, and finally defeated the Donboli army on 17 September and entered Khoy, effectively ending the Donbolis as a major political force in the region. In 1809 the Khanate of Tabriz was incorporated into the new established regency (velayat) of the Qajar crown prince, who hold traditionally the post of vicegerent (vali) of Azerbaijan with his seat of power at Tabriz.

== Khans of Tabriz ==
- Najaf Qoli Khan I (son of Shahbaz Khan I), *1713, †1785, succeeded his father 1731 in Churs, 1731–1785 ruler of Churs and Salmas, succeeded his brother Morteza Qoli Khan II 1747 as head of the Donboli tribe, 1757–1785 ruler in Azerbaijan, 1769–1785 governor of Tabriz, 1st Khan of Tabriz
- Khodadad Khan (his son), †1787 (killed by Sadegh Khan Shaqqaqi), succeeded his father 1785 in Tabriz, 1785–1787 governor of Tabriz, 2nd Khan of Tabriz
- Hossein Qoli Khan (nephew of Najaf Qoli Khan), *1756, †1798, 1786–1793 and 1797–1798 governor of Khoy, 4th Khan of Khoy, 1787 incorporated Tabriz in his domains as 3rd Khan of Tabriz.
- Jafar Qoli Khan Donboli (brother of Hossein Qoli Khan), opposed his brother 1793–1797 and 1799 in his brother's domains, 4th Khan of Tabriz.
- Najaf Qoli Khan II (grandson of Khodadad Khan), 1809 governor and ruling Khan of Tabriz. After him, Tabriz became the seat of the Iranian crown prince of the Qajar dynasty who also acted as the governor of Azerbaijan.
