= Khoy Khanate =

Kurdish khanate, located in Iranian Azerbaijan

The Khoy Khanate (Persian: خانات خوی, romanized: Khānāt-e Khoy), also known as the Principality of Donboli (Persian: شاهزاده‌نشین دنبلی, romanized: Shāhzādeneshīn-e Donbolī), was a hereditary Kurdish khanate around Khoy and Salmas in Iran ruled by the Donboli tribe from 1210 until 1799. The khanate has been described as the most powerful khanate in the region during the second half of the 18th century. The official religion of this principality was originally Yezidism, until some rulers eventually converted to Islam. The principality has its origins under the Ayyubid dynasty and was ultimately dissolved in 1799 by Abbas Mirza. During this period, the status of principality oscillated between autonomous and independent.

== History ==
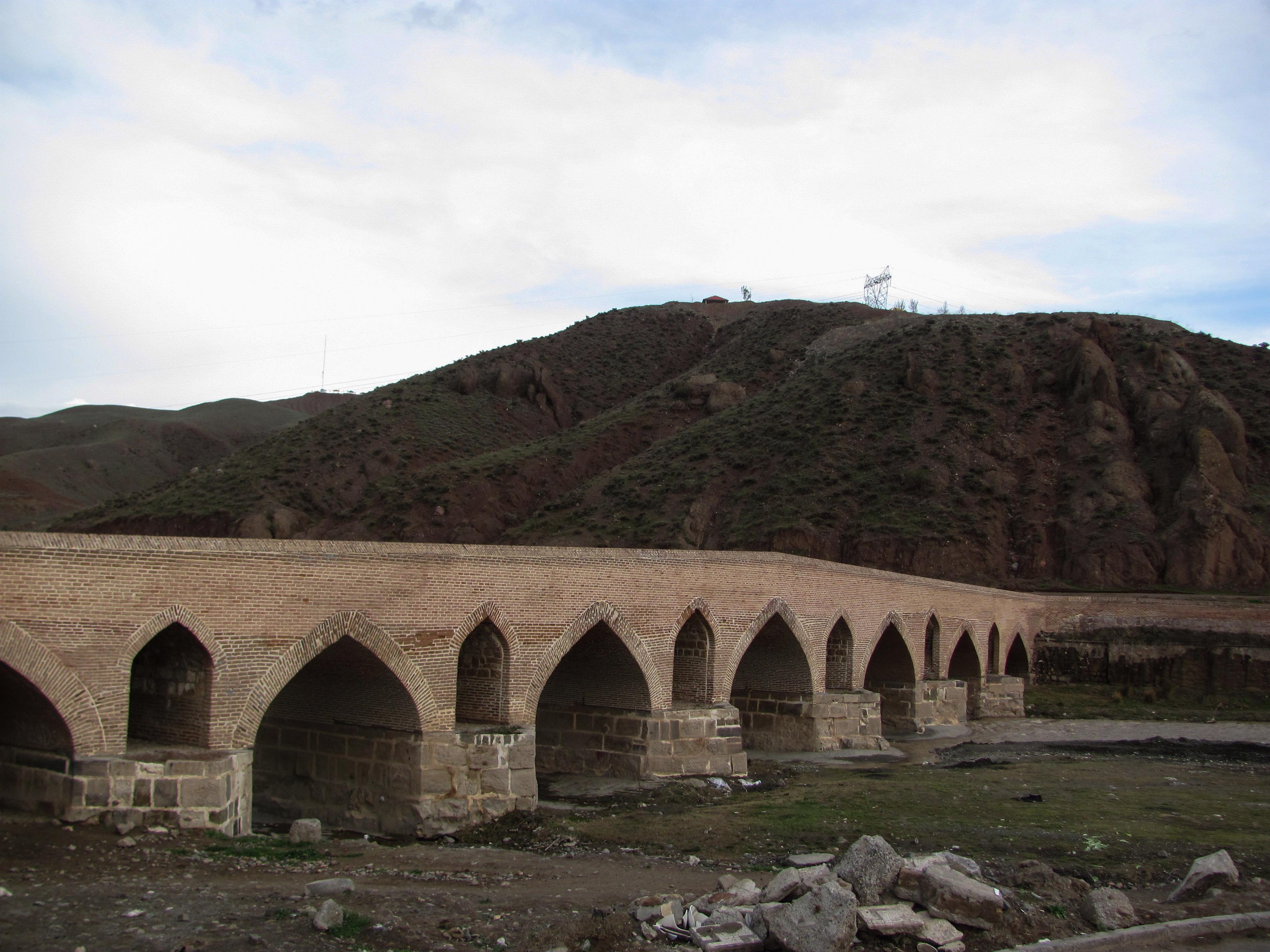
Khatun Bridge south of Khoy was built by Ahmad Khan Domboli in around 1756-1786.

=== Origins and Under the Safavids ===
The principality under Emir Ibrahim Donboli (d. 1320) had good relations with Ghazan of the Ilkhanate and supposedly saved the Ilkhanate from destruction. Nonetheless, the successor of Ibrahim Donboli, Cemşid Dunbulî (d. 1341), died fighting the Mongolians. The successor Emir Behlül Dunbulî (d. 1359) ended the wars with the Mongolians. He subsequently died in Hakkâri.

The leader of the Donboli tribe before the conquest of the region by the Aq Qoyunlu was Isa Beg. Under the administration of Aq Qoyunlu, Shaikh Ahmad Beg, a descendant of Isa Beg conquered territory around Hakkâri. When the Safavids captured the area, Haji Beg, the grandson of Shaikh Ahmad Beg was chosen as governor of Sokmanabad which now included Khoy (Shah Tahmasp merged Khoy and Sokmanabad into one district). Haji Beg was also entrusted with the defence of the Safavid frontier in Van before he was assassinated in 1548 by the Governor of Van. This event worsened the relations between the principality and Shah Tahmasp I who sent a force to subdue the Kurds and 400 Donboli members were massacred by the Qizilbash. The tribe consequently fled to the Ottoman Empire where they united under Mansur Beg, nephew of Haji Beg. About 400 Donboli members were killed and the massacres were perpetrated by the Qizilbash. The fear of growing Donboli influence in Kurdistan was another reason for the massacre. A nephew of Haji Beg fled to Qotur (then part of the Ottoman Empire) where he gathered the remnants of the tribe.

In the subsequent period from the late 16th century to early 17th century, Khoy was not under the rule of the Donboli. However, by the beginning of the 17th century, the principality changed their allegiance again and joined the Safavids and one Donboli, Jamshid Soltan was appointed mayor of Marand after the Safavid capture of Tabriz in 1603. Other Donboli appointments were Salman Soltan who was given the governorship of Salmas and Churs and Maqsud Soltan was given Barkosat. The city of Khoy returned to the Donbolis by the 1620s, since it was stated in a document from 1628 that the ruler of Khoy was a Salman Khan Donboli. Military assistance to the Shah was a condition for the handover. Afterwards, the descendants of Haji Beg would rule Khoy hereditarily and continuously under the title khan until the early 19th century. When Khoy was returned to the Donboli, the city was in ruins from military conflict with the Ottomans and had to receive a certain amount of tax revenues taken from the districts of Sharur and Dere-Alkis 'for foods'.

=== Afsharids and Zands ===
When Khoy was captured by Nader Shah from the Ottomans in 1737, the Donboli tribe under Najaf Qoli Khan entered the service of the Shah and also accompanied him in his military campaigns to India, Georgia and Dagestan. In 1743-1744, a powerful uprising took place in Khoy which received support from the local rayah, due to increased taxes by Nader Shah. However, the riots were ultimately suppressed by the Shah who sent in nomadic tribes from Shirvan, Ganja, and Yerevan.

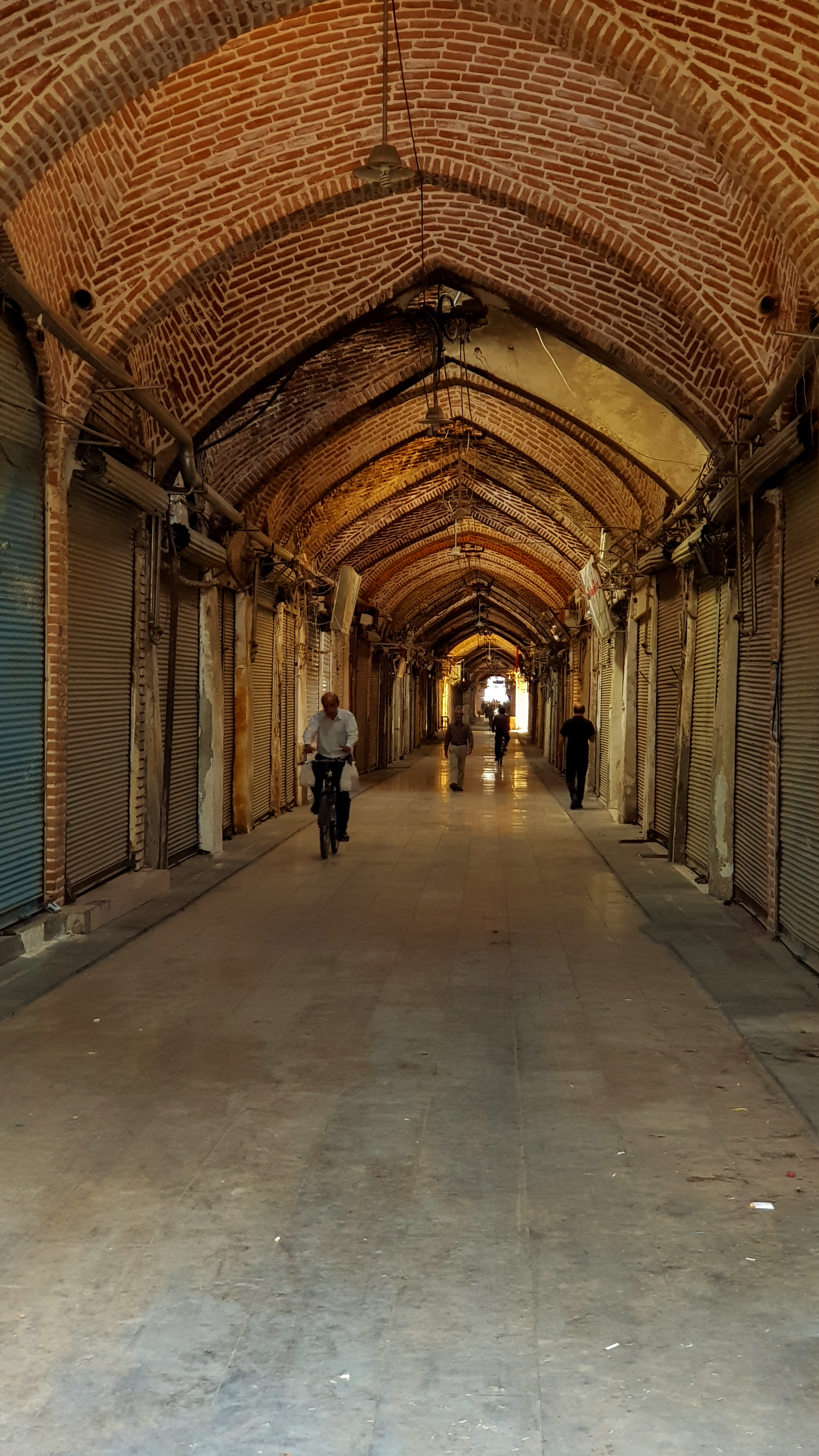
The old bazaar of Khoy was built by Ahmad Khan Donboli and served as the regional commercial center during the era.

According to British diplomat Harford Jones-Brydges, who was in Iran in the early 19th century, Jafar Qoli Kahn Donboli fought and defeated the Zand army in 1789 led by Lotf Ali Khan near Shiraz, imprisoning and killing about 18,000 soldiers. However, the castle of Shiraz was not taken and Ali Khan himself was unharmed. Jones-Brydges adds that Agha Mohammad Khan Qajar wished to 'reduce Azerbaijan' and therefore gave his ally Hosayn Qoli Donboli the possession of Tabriz Khanate in 1791.

=== Decline and Fall ===
In 1797 Agha Mohammad Khan Qajar was assassinated. As a result, revolts popped up all over the country. One of these rebels was Sadiq Khan Shaqaqi, who revolted with a 15,000 man army. He was able to take over much of Azerbaijan and besieged Qazvin. However, he was subsequently defeated at Qazvin and kicked out of Azerbaijan by the Donboli. In the Spring of 1798 Sadiq Khan Shaqaqi revolted again and attacked the Donbolis (due to Jafar Qoli Khan Donboli being appointed governor of Tabriz) but he was repulsed. Later though he was able to convince the Afshars of Urmia and the Donbolis to rebel. Fath-Ali Shah Qajar heard of the news in Dh'ul Qadah 1212 (April–May 1798) and made a farman to discourage the elites of Tabriz from supporting the alliance. Iranian forces eventually moved into Azerbaijan, captured Urmia on June 20, and on July 1 moved towards Salmas and Khoy and deposed Jafar Qoli Khan. Hosayn Qoli Donboli was placed on the throne in replacement of his brother. After Fath-Ali Shah left for Tehran in the autumn of 1798, Jafar Qoli Khan attempted to retake the throne from his brother but was repulsed.

In the Spring of 1799 Hosayn Qoli Donboli died of unknown causes and Jafar Qoli Khan was invited back and became the new Khan of Khoy. He requested confirmation from Fath-Ali Shah but the Shahanshah refused and sent Abbas Mirza to defeat the Donbolis. In June 1799 Abbas entered Tabriz and on September 17 the Donbolis were defeated near Khoy, effectively ending the khanate. Mahmud Khan was appointed as governor but not long after he was deposed and the khanate was annexed.

Jafar Qoli Khan Donboli fled to Maku and then to the Ottoman Empire. Later he switched alliances to the Russian Empire and was given Shaki Khanate in 1806. Jafar Qoli Khan had taken part in the Siege of Erivan in 1804 on the Russian side and received a dagger as a gift which he sought to erect in Khoy.

== Patronage ==
Numerous secretaries, accountants, and government officials emerged under the Khoy Khanate, with many later becoming prominent figures under the Qajar dynasty. Among them were: Mirza Hasan Sheikh ol-Islam, Aqa Ibrahim Sheikh ol-Islam, Mirza Mohammad Reza Hindi, Mirza Mohammad Ali Isfahani, Harif Jandaqi Khoyi, Mehr Ali Khoyi, Barfi Khoyi, Mahjur Khoyi, Shurida Khoyi, Saghar Tabrizi, Ta'ib Khoyi, Mirza Mahdi Munshi, Mazhar Khoyi, Aqa Mir Yaqub Kuh-Kamari, Haji Mir Habib Hashemi, Haji Mirza Ebrahim Donboli, the Fani family of Zunuz, and Fana'i Khoyi.

== Line of Khans of Khoy ==
- Sahbaz Khan Donboli I (descendant of Hajji Beg), died 1731, 1st Khan of Khoy
- Najaf Qoli Khan I (his son), born 1713, †1785, r. 1731–1785, 1734 entered service of Nader Shah Afshar and became chief musketeer, took part in campaign to India, entitled amir ol-'omara (lit. "commander of commanders"), 1742-1785 beglerbegi (governor-general) of Tabriz, 1769 governor of Khoy, 2nd Khan of Khoy
- Sahbaz Khan Donboli II (his nephew), †1773, 1744 joined his uncle and entered service of Nader Shah Afshar, 1750 allied with Azad Khan Afghan, 1757 allied with Mohammad Hassan Khan Qajar (father of Agha Mohammad Khan), 1762 allied with Karim Khan Zand, 1747–1763 governor of Khoy and Salmas, 3rd Khan of Khoy
- Ahmad Khan Donboli (his brother), *1735, †1786, 1763–1786 governor of Khoy, 4th Khan of Khoy
- Hosayn Qoli Donboli (his son), *1756, †1798, 1786–1793 and 1798-1799 governor of Khoy, 1791 allied with Agha Mohammad Khan and his Qajar dynasty, became governor of Tabriz, Khoy and Ardabil, 1792 entitled amir ol-'omara ("chief commander") and beglerbegi ("governor-general") of Azerbaijan, 1793 fell out of favor but was in 1798 reinstated by Fath Ali Shah Qajar in all posts, 5th Khan of Khoy
- Jafar Qoli Khan Donboli (his brother), †1814, 1793–1797 and 1798–1799 governor of Khoy, migrated 1800 to Russia and became 1806-1814 governor of Shekki, 6th Khan of Khoy. His grandchild, Fatali Khan Khoyski, became in 1918 the first prime minister of the Azerbaijan Democratic Republic
- Mohammad Sadeq Khan (son of Hossein Qoli Khan), amir ol-'omara, 1798–1813 governor of Azerbaijan, 7th Khan of Khoy.

== See also ==
- Tabriz Khanate
- Donboli (tribe)
- Fatali Khan Khoyski
- Rustam Khan Khoyski
- Amanollah Khan Zia' os-Soltan

== Bibliography ==
- Başçı, Veysel (2019), "Dunbulî Beyliği Tarihi ve Tarihi Kronikleri [XIII-XVIII. YY.]", Kadim Akademi SBD (in Turkish), 3 (2): 63–114
- Mirjafari, Hossein; Hadian, Koroush (2009). "The position of the Donboli Family in Iran's history from Safavid to Qajar". Historical Researches (in Persian). 1 (3): 1–18.
- Oberling, Pierre (1995), "DONBOLĪ", Encyclopedia Iranica, vol. VII
- Petrushevsky, Ilya Pavlovich (1949), Очерки по истории феодальных отношений в Азербайджане и Армении в XVI-начале XIX вв (in Russian), Saint Petersburg State University
