= Sohrab Khan Gorji (Georgian general) =

18th-century Georgian general

- ზურაბ (in Georgian)
- Born: Zurab c. 1755; Georgia, Persia (unofficially autonomous Georgia)
- Died: c. 1833; Persia
- Other name: سهراب خان (in Persian)
- Children: Khorshid Khanum
- Relatives: Georgian nobles; Maternal grandfather of Prince Abol-Hassan Mirza Sheikh-O-Raees Qajar
- Military career
- Allegiance: autonomous Georgia (until 1795); Qajar Iran (after 1795)
- Service years: before 1795
- Rank: General

Sohrab Khan Gorji (c. 1755 – c. 1833) was a Georgian noble and a general who served in the Georgian army prior to being captured in 1795 by the Persian army under the command of Agha Mohammad Khan Qajar. Sohrab Khan was brought to Tehran on 26 April 1796. He was the maternal grandfather of Prince Abol-Hassan Mirza Sheikh-O-Raees Qajar.

== Biography ==
Sohrab was a Georgian noble and a general who served in the Georgian army prior to 1795.

=== Battle of Tbilisi (1795) ===
In 1795, Agha Mohammad Khan attacked Tbilisi in order to respond to separatism of Irakli Khan, governor of Georgia, who brought Georgia under protection of the Russian government. Agha Mohammad Khan conquered Tbilisi. He spent 9 days in Tbilisi and took around 15,000 of their men, women, old, young, and infants as captives. Then, he went to Ganja and Shirvan (in today's country of Azerbaijan) and conquered them. He spent the winter in Mughan Plain, Iran. At the end of the season, Agha Mohammad Shah moved toward Tehran and arrived there on 26 April 1796 together with the captives.

Sohrab was one of the captives of the battle of Tbilisi in 1795 and was brought to Tehran together with other captives. Whether Sohrab was a combatant or civilian at the time of his capture in the 1795 battle is unclear.

=== Tehran ===
Sohrab arrived in Tehran on 26 April 1796. His title, khan, suggests that he was greatly honoured in the Qajar government. However, it is unclear whether he assumed any position in the Persian government.

=== Family ===
Sohrab's daughter, Khorshid Khanum resided in Tabriz and married FathAli Shah's 7th son, Mohammad Taqi Mirza (1791–1861). Khorshid Khanum had two sons: Prince Mohammad Hashem Mirza and Prince Abol-Hassan Mirza Sheikh-O-Raees (1848–1921)

In 1894, the Iranian poet and Sohrab's grandson writes (in Persian):
" سهراب خان از نجبا و امرای گرجستان و از جمله اسرای زمان شاهنشاه سعید شهید مرحوم آقا محمّدخان [بود] ."
Translation: Sohrab Khan [was] one of the nobles and generals of Georgia; he [was] one of the captives of the time of the prosperous martyred king of kings, Agha Mohammad Khan.

=== Children ===
- Khorshid Khanum (c. 1827 – c. 1874); married to Mohammad Taqi Mirza (1791–1861) when he was 54, i.e. in 1845; children:
  - Prince Mohammad Hashem Mirza Moeen-O-Tolieh (c. 1846 – c. 1919)
  - Prince Abol-Hassan Mirza Sheikh-O-Raees Qajar (1848–1921)

== Alternate Names and Titles ==
Sohrab's alternate names and titles include: Zurab, Zorab, Zourab, and Zohrab; (Georgian: ზურაბ); (Persian: (سهراب), (زوراب), (سهراب خان), (سهرابخان), (سهراب خان گرجی)).
