= Najaf Qoli, Lorestan =

Najaf Qoli نجفقلي
- Village
- Location within Iran
- Coordinates: 33°50′14″N 48°13′36″E
- Country: Iran
- Province: Lorestan
- County: Selseleh
- Bakhsh: Central
- Rural District: Doab

Population (2006)
  - Total: 67
- Time zone: UTC+3:30 (IRST)
  - Summer (DST): UTC+4:30 (IRDT)

Najaf Qoli (Persian: نجفقلي, also Romanized as Najaf Qolī; also known as Najaf Golī and Najafī) is a village in Doab Rural District, in the Central District of Selseleh County, Lorestan Province, Iran. At the 2006 census, its population was 67, in 13 families.
