= Shaqaqi (tribe) =

Kurdish tribe

Languages
- Azerbaijani

Religion
- Shia Islam

Shaqaqi (Kurdish: شەقاقی ,Şeqaqî, Persian: شقاقی) is a Kurdish tribe in Iran. Its branches nowadays live in East Azerbaijan, Razavi Khorasan and North Khorasan provinces of Iran. They mainly speak Azerbaijani language and are Shiite Muslims. Albeit sharing similar names, today they differ from the Shekak tribe, who are Sunni and speak Kurmanji.

== History ==
The Shaqaqi tribe has been described as brave warriors and they trained officers of soldiers of the Qajar dynasty since the reign of Agha Mohammad Khan Qajar.

== See also ==
- Sarab Khanate
