= Shahbaz Khan Donboli =

Sahbaz Khan Donboli
- Khan of Khoy
- Reign: 1747 – 1763
- Successor: Ahmad Khan Donboli
- Born: c. 1699; Khoy, Iranian Azerbaijan, Persia
- Died: 1767; Khoy, Iranian Azerbaijan, Persia
- Dynasty: Afsharid dynasty
- Military career
- Conflicts: List of Battles: Zand campaigns in Kurdistan and Luristan; Battle of Qara Chaman (POW)

Sahbaz Khan Donboli (Persian: شهباز خان دنبلی) was the first khan of the Khoy Khanate from 1747 to 1763

| Preceded by | Khan of Khoy; 1747 - 1763 | Succeeded by Ahmad Khan Donboli |
