= Sadeq Khan Shaqaqi =

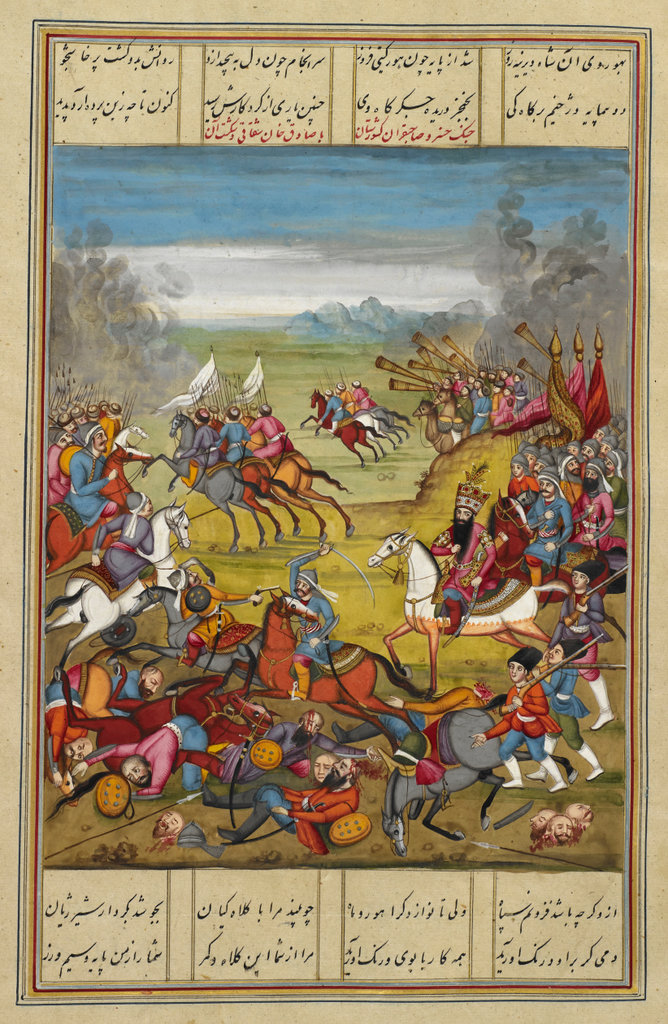
- Fath ‘Ali Shah's defeat of Sadeq Khan Shaqaqi, folio from the Shahanshahnameh of Fath 'Ali Khan Saba, dated 1810

Khan of Sarab
- Reign: 1786–1800
- Predecessor: Ali Khan Shaqaqi
- Died: 1800
- Father: Ali Khan Shaqaqi
- Religion: Shia Islam

Sadeq Khan Shaqaqi (Persian: صادق خان شقاقی) was the chief of the Shaqaqi tribe and khan of Sarab from 1786 to 1800. He was the eldest son and successor of Ali Khan Shaqaqi.

The Shaqaqi were Kurds who had become Turkified and converted to Shia Islam. They originally populated the Ardabil region, using Meshginshahr as their headquarters. After Nader Qoli Beg arrived to Azerbaijan in 1730, however, they were deported to Khorasan. They eventually returned to Azerbaijan, this time establishing themselves in Sarab and Miyaneh.

Sadeq Khan may have taken advantage on the hate of the would-be assassins of Agha Mohammad Khan Qajar (r. 1789–1797), the Qajar shah of Iran. Following the latter's assassination in June 1797, Sadeq Khan emptied the royal tent, taking Agha Mohammad Khan's prized possessions with him, including the Kayanian crown. Sadeq Khan quickly crossed the Aras, where he assembled his Shaqaqi forces and attacked the Qajar forces, which scattered towards the capital Tehran. Sadeq Khan soon established his rule in most of Azerbaijan, planning to put his dynasty on the Iranian throne. He gave the governorship of Tabriz and Qaradagh to his two brothers, and at the head of 15,000 tribesmen marched towards Qazvin, where some of his family members were kept.

== Sources ==
- Amanat, Abbas (2017). Iran: A Modern History. Yale University Press. ISBN 978-0300112542.
- Tapper, Richard (1997). Frontier Nomads of Iran: A Political and Social History of the Shahsevan. Cambridge University Press. ISBN 978-0-52158-336-7.

Preceded by Ali Khan Shaqaqi	Khan of Sarab; 1786–1800	Succeeded by
