= Afshars of Urmia =

Location of Urmia in present-day Iran

The Afshars of Urmia (also spelled Urmiya; Persian: افشارهای ارومیه) are a branch of the Afshar tribe centered in the Iranian city of Urmia. From 1624/25 to 1820/21, the governorship of Urmia was mainly in the hands of the Urmia Afshars. After that, only a few them served as its governor, the last one being Imam Quli Khan, who became governor in 1879/80.

Many of the Afshar governors of Urmia bore the prominent title of beglarbegi, i.e. governor-general.

== History ==
Fath-Ali Khan Afshar was in power from 1747 to 1748, and again from 1757 until 1762. Shortly after coming to power, he was expelled by Mehdi Khan Afshar, who was then appointed governor by Ebrahim Shah. However, Mehdi Khan Afshar was then overthrown by Azad Khan Afghan, and Fath 'Ali Khan became his deputy. In the aftermath of Nader Shah's death, the khans of Urmia were able to expand to control practically all the lands of Azerbaijan.

After the fall of Azad Khan Afghan, the people of Tabriz invited Fath 'Ali Khan to become the new ruler. In 1759, Fath 'Ali Khan marched onto Karabakh Khanate, which resulted in 6 months long siege and ultimately, Panah Ali Khan, khan of Karabakh Khanate, accepting to be the dependency of Fath-Ali. Panah Ali Khan's son Ibrahim Khalil Khan was taken hostage after the siege.

In 1761 Karim Khan Zand and Panah Ali Khan's combined forces marched onto Urmia, which resulted in Fath-Ali retreating to the city of Urmia. In May 1762, Karim Khan Zand struck again by capturing the city of Maragha and later sieging the city of Urmia for 9 months, which resulted in it being captured. Fath-Ali was hanged in Shiraz in 1763.

After Fath-'Ali Khan's death, Rustam Khan Afshar succeeded him. In 1768, he was succeeded by Reza Qoli Khan Afshar. In 1772 he was succeeded by Imam Qoli Khan Afshar. After the death of Karim Khan Zand in 1779, Imam Qoli Khan Afshar expanded Urmia once again. It is said that he received taxes from Savojbulagh, Senneh, Maragheh, Tabriz, and Khoy. However, eventually in 1783 the Zand leader 'Ali Morad Khan Zand sent an army to defeat Imam Qoli Khan Afshar. He succeeded in killing the khan and installing Amir Aslam Khan Afshar on the throne as a Zand puppet, but a few months later Mohammad Qoli Khan Afshar overthrew him with the support of the Afshar chieftains.

Eventually in 1824 the governor of Urmia was extinguished as the Afshars lost control of the governorship, but the Afshars continued to play an important role in the politics of Urmia.

== List of governors of Urmia from 1624/25 to 1879/80 ==
The governors of Urmia from 1624/25 to 1879/80 were the following;

Date	Governor	Origin	Sovereign
1624/25	Kalb Ali Khan	Imanlu subgroup of the Afshar tribe	Shah Abbas I (r. 1588–1629)
1633/34	Ganj Ali Khan	Imanlu subgroup of the Afshar tribe	Shah Safi (r. 1629–1642)
?	Muhammad Isa Khan	Imanlu subgroup of the Afshar tribe	Shah Abbas II (r. 1642–1666)
?	Muhammad Ali Khan	Afshar tribe. Possibly Imanlu	Shah Abbas II (r. 1642–1666)
?	Shah Virdi Khan	Imanlu subgroup of the Afshar tribe	Shah Abbas II (r. 1642–1666)
?	Ganj Ali Khan II	Imanlu subgroup of the Afshar tribe	Shah Abbas II (r. 1642–1666)
?	Muhammad Isa Khan II	Afshar tribe. Possibly Imanlu	Unknown
1656	Silspur Khan Jalali	Emigrant from the Ottoman Empire	Unknown
1677/78	Imam Virdi Khan	Afshar tribe	Shah Suleiman (r. 1666–1694)
?	Fazl Ali Khan	Imanlu subgroup of the Afshar tribe	Shah Suleiman (r. 1666–1694)
?	Subhan Virdi Khan	Afshar tribe	Shah Suleiman (r. 1666–1694)
?	Jani Khan	Unknown	Shah Suleiman (r. 1666–1694)
1695	Aghzivar Khan	Shamlu tribe	Soltan Hoseyn (r. 1694–1722)
1696	Fazl Ali Khan	Unknown	Soltan Hoseyn (r. 1694–1722)
1707/08	Khudadad Khan	Qasimlu subgroup of the Afshar tribe	Soltan Hoseyn (r. 1694–1722)
1722	Muhammad Qasim Khan	Qasimlu subgroup of the Afshar tribe	Soltan Hoseyn (r. 1694–1722)
1725	Yusuf Pasha	Unknown	Ahmed III (r. 1703–1730)
?	Farrukh Pasha	Unknown	Ahmed III (r. 1703–1730)
1730	Paru Khan	Afshar tribe	Tahmasp Qoli Khan (later known as Nader Shah)
1734	Ashur Khan	From Khorasan. Papalu subgroup of Afshar tribe	Tahmasp Qoli Khan
?	Baktash Khan	From Khorasan. Qirqlu subgroup of the Afshar tribe	Tahmasp Qoli Khan
1735/36	Muhammad Isa Khan	Khudadad Khan family from the Qasimlu subgroup of the Afshar tribe	Tahmasp Qoli Khan
?	Muhammad Qasim Khan	Afshar tribe	Tahmasp Qoli Khan
1736	Muhammad Karim Khan	Qasimlu subgroup of the Afshar tribe	Nader Shah (r. 1736–1747)
1745/46	Fath-Ali Khan Afshar	Arashlu subgroup of the Afshar tribe	Nader Shah (r. 1736–1747)
c. 1747	Mahdi Khan Afshar	Qasimlu subgroup of the Afshar tribe	None
?	Fath-Ali Khan Afshar	Arashlu subgroup of the Afshar tribe	Mahdi Khan Afshar
?	Naqi Khan	Qasimlu subgroup of the Afshar tribe	Mahdi Khan Afshar
1750	Azad Khan Afghan	Pashtun	None
1759	Fath-Ali Khan Afshar	Arashlu subgroup of the Afshar tribe	None
1763	Rustam Khan	Qasimlu subgroup of the Afshar tribe	Karim Khan Zand (r. 1751–1779)
1768/69	Riza Quli Khan	Qasimlu subgroup of the Afshar tribe	Karim Khan Zand (r. 1751–1779)
1772/73	Imam Quli Khan	Qasimlu subgroup of the Afshar tribe	Karim Khan Zand (r. 1751–1779)
1783	Amir Aslan Khan	Sayin-Qalah subgroup of the Afshar tribe	Ali-Morad Khan Zand (r. 1781–1785)
1784	Muhammad Quli Khan	Qasimlu subgroup of the Afshar tribe	Ali-Morad Khan Zand (r. 1781–1785)
1790	Qasim Khan	Khudadad Khan family from the Qasimlu subgroup of the Afshar tribe	Agha Mohammad Khan Qajar (r. 1789–1797)
1792/93	Muhammad Quli Khan	Khudadad Khan family from the Qasimlu subgroup of the Afshar tribe	Agha Mohammad Khan Qajar (r. 1789–1797)
1798	Husayn Quli Khan	Khudadad Khan family from the Qasimlu subgroup of the Afshar tribe	Fath-Ali Shah Qajar (r. 1797–1834)
1820/21	Najaf Quli Khan	Khudadad Khan family from the Qasimlu subgroup of the Afshar tribe	Abbas Mirza
1823/24	Malik Qasim Mirza	Prince of the Qajar dynasty	Abbas Mirza
1828	Ibrahim Khan Sardar	Qajar tribe	Abbas Mirza
1832	Jahangir Mirza	Prince of the Qajar dynasty	Abbas Mirza
1834	Haydar Ali Khan	From the city of Shiraz	Mohammad Shah Qajar (r. 1834–1848)

== Sources ==
- Bournoutian, George (2021). From the Kur to the Aras: A Military History of Russia's Move into the South Caucasus and the First Russo-Iranian War, 1801–1813. Brill. ISBN 978-9004445154.
- Bulookbashi, Ali A.; Negahban, Farzin (2008). "Afshār". In Madelung, Wilferd; Daftary, Farhad (eds.). Encyclopaedia Islamica Online. Brill Online. ISSN 1875-9831.
- Kondo, Nobuaki (1999). "Qizilbash Afterwards: The Afshars in Urmiya from the Seventeenth to the Nineteenth Century". Iranian Studies. 32 (4): 537–556. doi:10.1080/00210869908701968. JSTOR 4311300. (registration required)
- Oberling, P. (1984). "Afšār". In Yarshater, Ehsan (ed.). Encyclopædia Iranica. Vol. I/6: Afghanistan–Ahriman. London and New York: Routledge & Kegan Paul. pp. 582–586. ISBN 978-0-71009-095-9.
- Tapper, Richard (1997). Frontier Nomads of Iran: A Political and Social History of the Shahsevan. Cambridge University Press. ISBN 978-0-52158-336-7.
