= Donboli tribe =

Major Kurdish tribe

The Donboli (Kurdish: دونبللی ,دنبلى, Donbolī) are a Turkic-speaking, Kurdish tribe who live around Khoy and Salmas in northwestern Iran. They are currently adherents of Shia Islam, but before that they were reportedly and some still are Yazidis for a long time.

According to Sharafkhan Bidlisi (died 1603/04), the Donboli was known as "Donbol-e Bokht" since the "most authentic" theory said that they originated in Bohtan, an area in what is now southeast Turkey between Siirt and Cizre. It appears that one Isa Beg, whose heirs were referred to as the "Isa Begi", was its first leader. A few years before to the formation of the Aq Qoyunlu in 1378, the Isa Begi ruled the district of Sokmanabad (modern-day Zarabad). One of Isa Beg's descendants, Shaikh Ahmad Beg rose to prominence in the Aq Qoyunlu government and took control of both the Hakkari territory southeast of Lake Van and the castle of Bay, which was held by the Donboli for a considerable amount of time. The Safavid shah (king) of Iran, Tahmasp I (r. 1524–1576) had Sokmanabad and Khoy merged into a single district and entrusted it to Shaikh Ahmad Beg's grandson Haji Beg as its governor, who was given the title of haji soltan. Haji Beg was also given the responsibility of guarding the realm's borders.

It seems that certain families in southeast Anatolia stayed behind when the Donboli northwestern Iran. Sharafkhan Bidlisi and Carsten Niebuhr (died 1815) both made reference to this group, with the latter reporting that it was situated south of Diyarbakr and that its number of tents was approximately 500. A community of Donboli Kurds—possibly not Turkicized—existed in the Safavid Erivan province in the 18th century.

Today, the Donboli no longer have their tribal identity and become sedentary.

== Sources ==
- Bournoutian, George (2021). From the Kur to the Aras: A Military History of Russia's Move into the South Caucasus and the First Russo-Iranian War, 1801–1813. Brill. ISBN 978-90-04-44515-4.
- Dawud, Ali Al-e; Oberling, Pierre (1995). "Donbolī". In Yarshater, Ehsan (ed.). Encyclopædia Iranica. Vol. VII/5: Divorce IV–Drugs. London and New York: Routledge & Kegan Paul. pp. 445–465. ISBN 978-1-56859-023-3.
- Gledhill, Kevin (2022). "Khoy (Ḵoy)". In Yarshater, Ehsan (ed.). Encyclopædia Iranica (Online ed.). Encyclopædia Iranica Foundation.
- Oberling, Pierre (2004). "Kurdish tribes". Encyclopaedia Iranica.
- Perry, John R. (1979). Karim Khan Zand: A History of Iran, 1747–1779. University of Chicago Press. ISBN 978-0226660981.
