= Fall of Isfahan (1750) =

1750 Siege

Siege of Isfahan (1750)
- Part of Zand campaigns in Kurdistan and Luristan
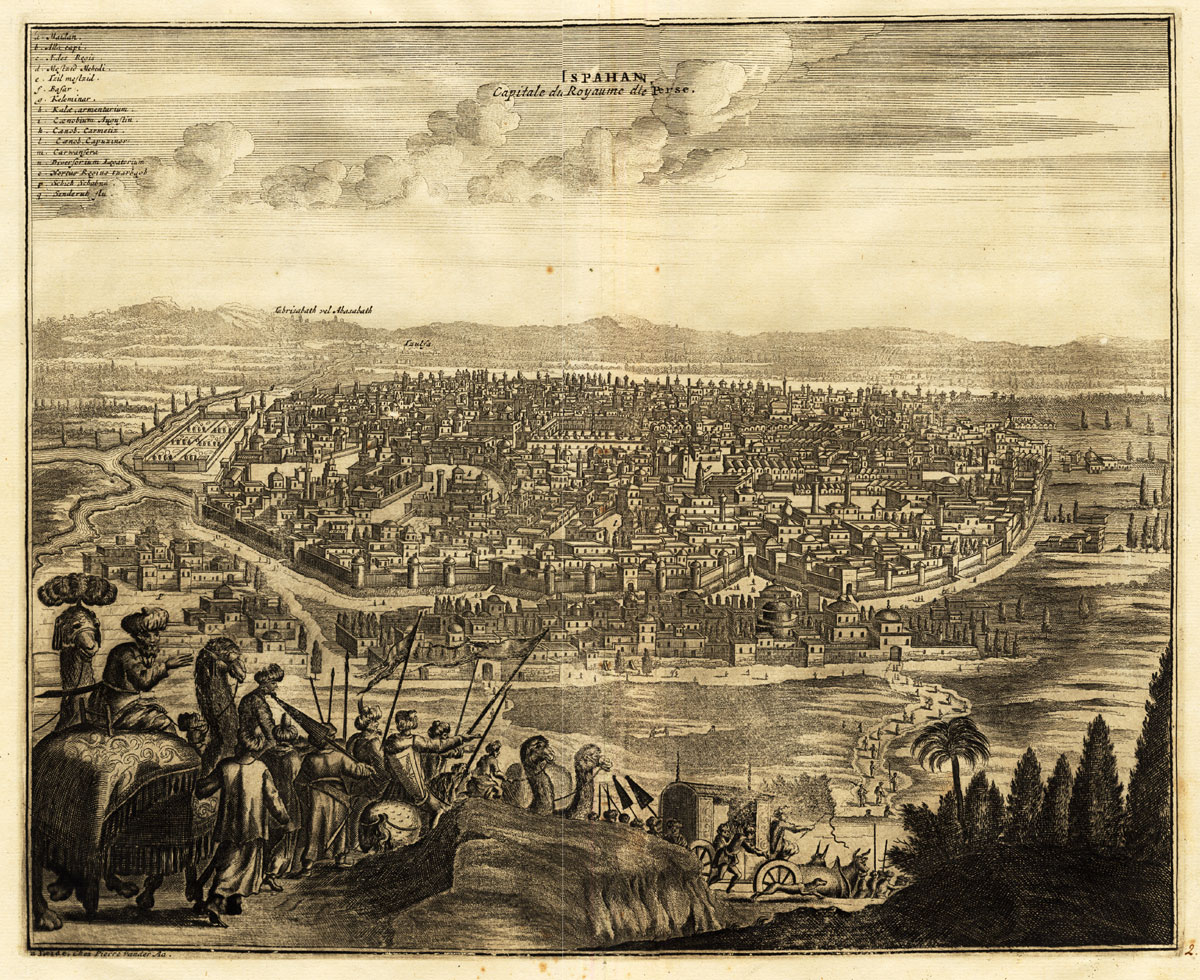
- 'Isfahan, capital of the Kingdom of Persia', by Pieter van der Aa.
Date	Late May - 31 May 1750
Location	Isfahan, Iran
Result	Coalition victory
Territorial changes	Isfahan and surrounding areas conquered by Bakhtiari tribesmen

Belligerents
Coalition: Chahar Lang Bakhtiari; Forces of Zakariya Khan; Zands	Army of Isfahan; Afsharids

Commanders and leaders
Ali Mardan Khan; Karim Khan Zand; Zakariya Khan; Shahbaz	Abu'l Fath Khan (surrendered); Salim Khan Qirqlu (surrendered)

Strength
20,000 under Ali Mardan; 12,000 under Karim Khan; 2,000 Qaraguzlu under Shahbaz	Qahriz: 15,000; Isfahan: 50,000

The Siege of Isfahan began took place in the summer of 1750 when the combined forces of Ali Mardan Khan, Karim Khan Zand, and Zakariya Khan besieged the city from the Afsharid remnants present there.

The Afsharids were defeated in a series of pitched battles prior to the siege, allowing the coalition armies to march up to the city of Isfahan, which was bombarded for several days. Several breaches were made, and the Afsharid forces ultimately were forced to relinquish control of the city.

== Background ==
After Nader Shah's death, various Zagros tribes began their migration back to Western Iran. This influx of tribesmen resulted in a power vacuum that was headed by multiple consequential tribal chieftains. The main outpost still controlled by the decaying Afsharids formed by the late Nader was Isfahan, which was targetted by Ali Mardan Khan Bakhtiari, chief of the Chahar Lang branch of the Bakhtiari tribe. He took over the mountains in the region of Chaharmahal and Bakhtiari and seized Golpeyagan from Karim Khan Zand, who had partnered with Zakariya Khan. Ali Mardan was defeated near Murchakhor by the Afsharid defenders in Isfahan in Spring 1750 and appealed for help from Karim. He occupied Gaz and pillaged Julfa but his army was severely outnumbered, and the Afsharid host of 50,000 consisted largely of Haft Lang Bakhtiari and were led by Abu'l Fath-Khan, who had been assigned as commandant by Ebrahim Mirza Afshar.

== Battle of Qahriz ==
In May 1750, Karim, Ali Mardan and Zakariya made a three-fold alliance with support of 2,000 Qaraguzlu from Shahbaz, a warlord near Hamadan and gathered 20,000; they faced a detachment of Afshars under Salim Khan Qirqlu numbering 15,000 and defeated them at Qahriz. He escaped to Qazvin but was cornered and forced to change allegiances by Zand forces.

== Siege ==
The coalition besieged Isfahan and bombarded it for several days; this in conjunction with the defeat in a pitched battle and the lack of support from Mashhad weakened the resolve of the defenders that began dissipating. Within a few days the coalition's attacks became more successful and on 31 May, 1750 the Zands entered Julfa via the Khwaju Bridge, while Ali Mardan successfully breached the main gate. Abu'l Fath-Khan attempted to flee into the citadel but was convinced to surrender and was spared.

== Aftermath ==
Ali Mardan took charge of political affairs in the city. He rapaciously taxed the oppressed Christian Armenians of Julfa and forced Father Louis Bazin, former physician of Nader Shah to concede two silver candlesticks. On 12 June, 1750, he presented in front of the town Torab Khan, to be coronated as Ismail III, which he was on 29 June.

Ali Mardan took the title of vakil ol-dawla (Note: "Deputy of the state") but was later defeated and ousted by Karim, who took Isfahan and Ismail for himself. Abol-Fath Khan was allowed to remain governor of Isfahan.
