= Shehni =

Iranian ethnic group

Shehni (Persian: شهنی) is a Bakhtiari clan that consists of multiple sub-clans. The Shehni clan is itself a part of the Haft Lang branch of the Bakhtiari tribe in Iran.

== Subclans ==
List of Shehni sub-clans:

- Belel
- Bahadorvand
- Tajdinvand
- Shahsevand
- Khaje
- Sheykh
- Sheykhvand
- Barvand
- Charm
- Arzanivand
- Kashani
- Ghanbarvand
