= Siege of Kermanshah =

Siege lasting 1752-1753

- Part of Zand campaigns in Western Iran
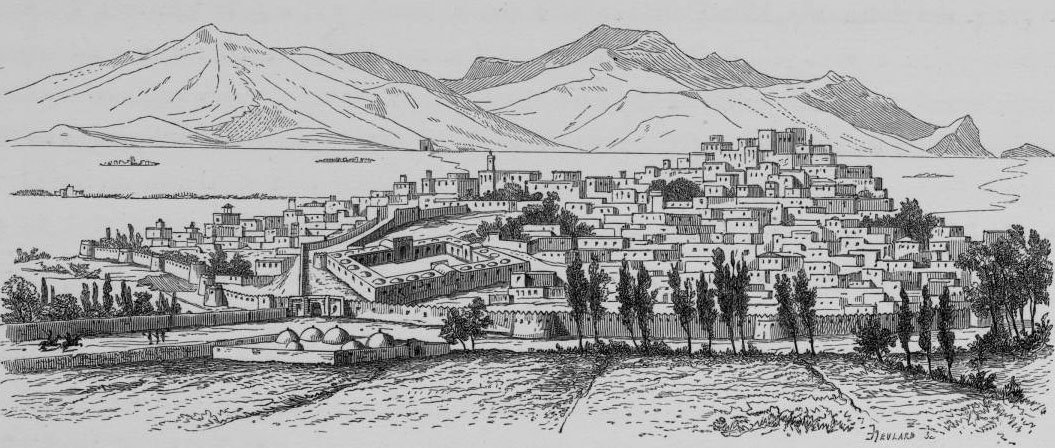
- Kermanshah by Pascal Coste, 1840
Date	1752-May/June 1753
Location	Kermanshah, Iran 34.316667°N 47.068611°E
Result	Zand victory
Territorial changes	Kermanshah occupied by the Zands

Belligerents
Garrison of Kermanshah; Supported by: Haft Lang Bakhtiari; Feyli Lurs	Zand Iran

Commanders and leaders
'Abd ol-'Ali Khan Mishmast (surrendered); Mirza Mohammad Taqi Golestaneh (surrendered); Ali Mardan Khan; Esma'il Khan Feyli; Soltan Hoseyn II	Karim Khan Zand; Mohammad Khan Zand; Sadeq Khan Zand; Shaykh Ali Khan Zand; Najaf Qoli Khan

Strength
6,000+: 4 mortars	1752: 18-19,000+: 8 mortars; 1753: 42,000+

Casualties and losses
Heavy: Entire garrison surrendered; Ali Mardan's force destroyed	Unknown

The Siege of Kermanshah was a siege engagement fought between 1752-53 between the forces of Karim Khan Zand, ruler of Zand Iran and the garrison of Kermanshah, aided by various nearby tribes. The goal of the Zands was to seize the crucial armament depot and to consolidate their rule over Lorestan, where they were native to, and it was a landmark moment in Karim Khan's campaigns to subdue western Persia.

== Background ==
In May 1752, Karim Khan Zand decisively defeated Ali Mardan Khan at the Battle of Nahavand, paving the way for him to begin besieging the fortress of Kermanshah which had been scrutinized by the Zands and protected by Ali Mardan. Kermanshah had at least 6,000 cavalry in its garrison. Early in these efforts however, the Zand effort was cut short by the Qajars under Mohammad Hasan Khan Qajar; Karim repelled them and pursued them to Astarabad, where he was defeated and suffered heavy losses. The Kurdish tribes of Kalhor and Zangana were triggered by Ali Mardan Khan and his heavy demands on them, which were made even more burdensome by their reluctance to accept his suzerainty and Bakhtiari control in general. The Kalhor and Zangana sent pleas to Karim Khan shortly before the siege.

== Mohammad Khan Zand's strategy ==
The Zands continued their efforts; a force of about 2,000 under Mohammad Khan Zand had been deployed to watch the qal'a and allied with local Kalhor and Zangana tribesmen led by Najaf Qoli Khan to raid the city, cutting it off from supplies and attacking Kermanshahi foraging parties. Kermanshah was commanded by 'Abd ol-'Ali and Mohammad Taqi, and the former led 200 that fended off Najaf Qoli on 16 November, 1752 and sent them to their base in Harunabad. Najaf Qoli requested support from Mohammad Khan Zand, who possessed about 10,000. He made preparations to escalate the siege and sent Sadeq Khan Zand forward with a detachment of 1,000.

The Zands blocked all four sides of the fort, placing 3-4,000 on three of them and concentrating 14,000. They spread out in the advance to avoid artillery casualties, but at the gates they had to retreat in close range of 3 mortars with 80lb capacity each. Mohammad Khan Zand attempted to dig trenches around the city in zigzag formations, but despite pelleting the city with musket fire was unable to inflict heavy casualties. Two arsenal workers asked for aid from Ali Mardan Khan Bakhtiari, who was hiding out in the mountains. A Zand contingent led by Kamar Khan simultaneously repelled a sortie from 70 defenders of the garrison.

A counter-volley led by 'Abd ol-'Ali also yielded few results. Mohammad Khan Zand recalibrated again and organized a battery near the Qara Su with 8 mortars of 400lbs capacity to bombard the qal'a, building a trench there and killing 24 defenders in the subsequent bombardment. The defenders responded with a clever ambush where 250 dressed in Afghan attire fell upon the Qara Su trench, destroying the mortars and forcing the defenders, who believed them to be the forces of Azad Khan Afghan, to flee.

== Stalemate ==
Mohammad Khan Zand sent ultimatums requesting the beleaguered garrison's surrender, but little was accomplished over 5 months of static fighting. A brief interruption took place when an arsenal worker in Kermanshah lit a fuse to a cache of powder skins buried under a few cannonballs, causing a massive explosion that destroyed three towers and the walls in between. Despite this, no assault took place as Mohammad Khan Zand was shocked at the treachery; he had the arsenal worker beaten and imprisoned when he arrived at the Zand encampments expecting a reward.

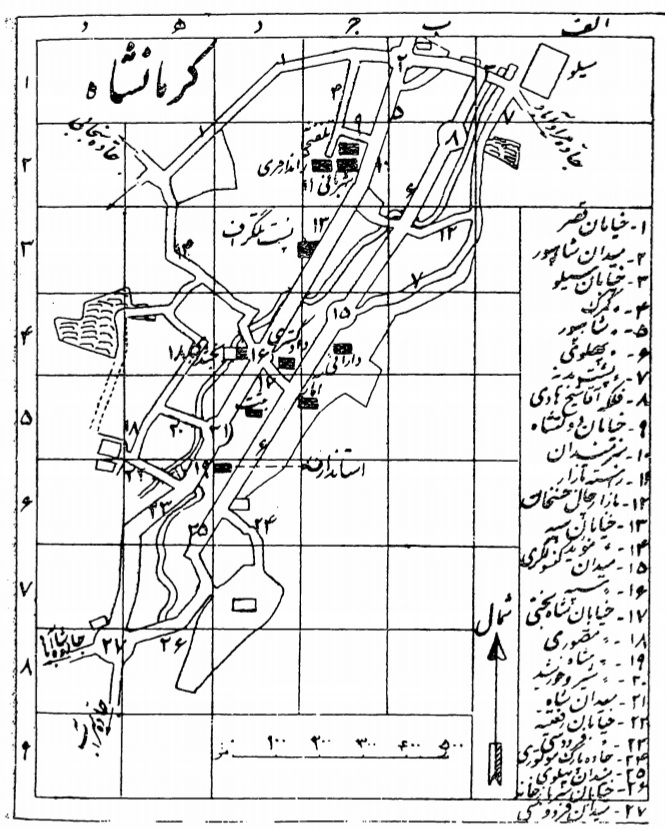
Map of Kermanshah (1330)

The garrison's supplies dwindled but correspondence was maintained with Ali Mardan Khan, who sought to double down on his efforts to relieve Kermanshah, and had entered Lorestan where he was recruiting warriors.

== Fall ==
=== Intervention of Ali Mardan ===
Ali Mardan raised a force with the help of Mostafa Khan Bigdeli Shamlu, former ambassador of Nader Shah that resided in Baghdad, the Ottoman commander in the city named Soleyman Pasha and his lieutenant Esma'il Khan Feyli. The intent was to defeat Karim and take Isfahan, an effort legitimized by using the faux prince Soltan Hoseyn II who claimed to be a son of the Soltan Hoseyn that ruled the Safavid dynasty from 1694-1722. However, the pretender proved both incompetent and impolite and soldiers were denied from seeing him after the army set march toward Kermanshah in Spring 1753.

=== Surrender ===
As a result, a mutiny broke out that caused the force to falter. Karim gathered an army of 42,000 in May, 1753 and easily defeated this rabble; he dispatched an ultimatum upon arrival for the surrender of Kermanshah. 'Abd ol-'Ali and Mohammad Taqi sent their envoy, the writer Abu'l-Hasan Golestana to certify their surrender. The defenders were given generous terms, being spared along with their commanders. 'Abd ol-'Ali moved to isfahan afterwards and Mohammad Taqi remained in Kermanshah, but he was replaced as governor of both the town and qal'a by Ali Mardan Khan Zand

== Aftermath ==
The successful siege of Kermanshah gave the Zands access to an important military depot of Western Iran, and a subsequent engagement where Ali's rabble army was destroyed marked the last of Karim Khan Zand and Ali Mardan Khan's battles. However, the Zands sustained a heavy defeat the same year when Azad Khan Afghan invaded, capturing territory as far south as Shiraz and briefly establishing himself as the pre-eminent power in Persia before his eventual defeat by the Qajars.

== Notes ==
- Ali Mardan Khan Bakhtiari blinded Soltan Hoseyn II and sent him to live in the Shia shrines of Iraq afterwards.

- Abu'l Hasan Golestana (writer and diplomat mentioned in the surrender section) wrote the primary source for the annals of the Zand dynasty.
