= Movri (tribe) =

Movri Tribe
طایفه موری
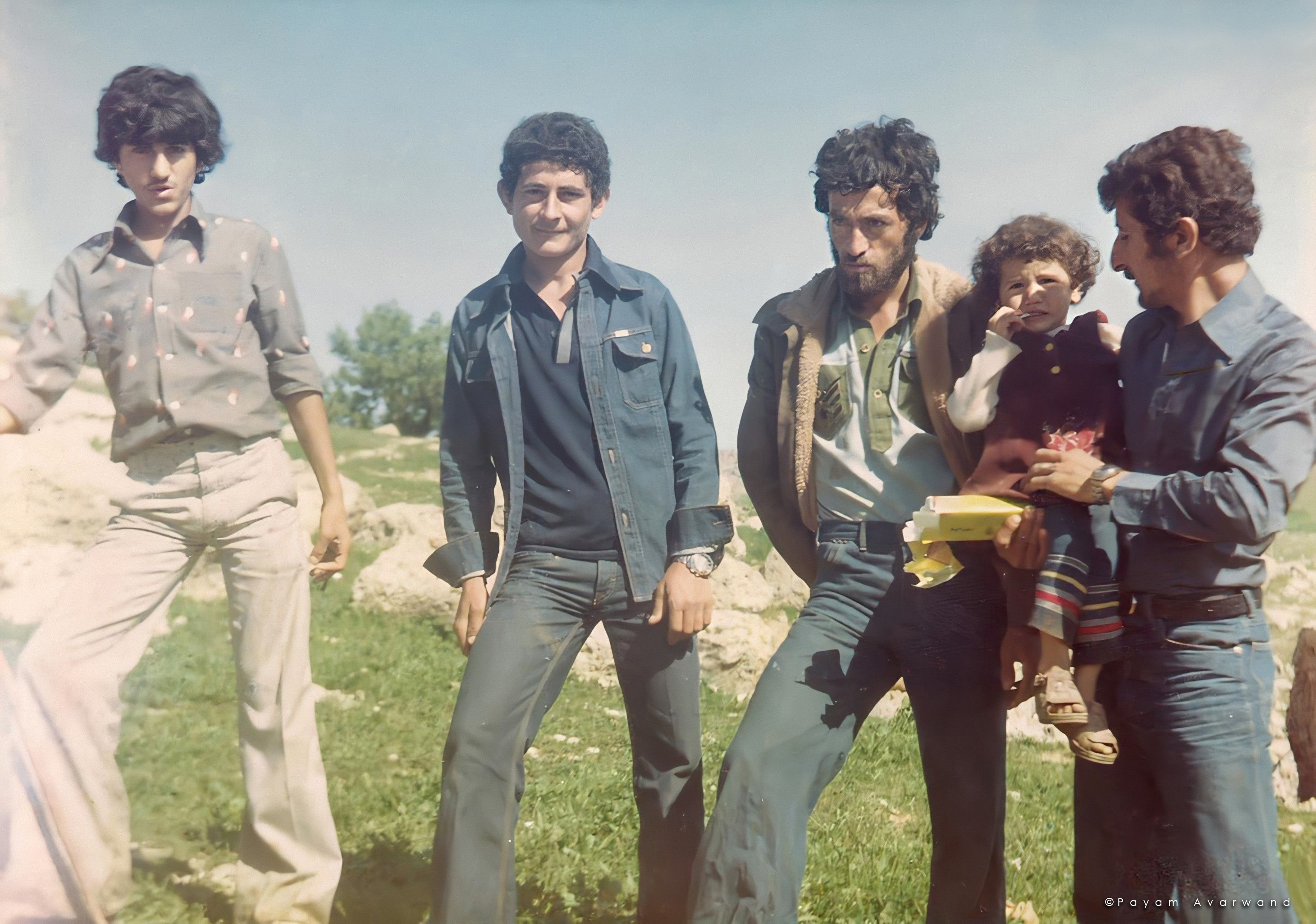

Total population
- Unknown (one of the larger Bakhtiari clans)

Regions with significant populations
- Iran: Chaharmahal and Bakhtiari, Khuzestan, Isfahan; Afghanistan: Herat, Balkh, Samangan

Languages
- Bakhtiari dialect

Religion
- Officially Shia Islam

The Movri (Persian: طایفه موری) is one of the major and well-known Iranian tribes of the Bakhtiari people, part of the Haft Lang branch, and one of the seven main clans of Duraki Bab. The tribe's name is an eponym, drawn from its ancestor, "Movri".

== Distribution ==
The primary homeland of the Movri tribe in Iran was in the Upper Bazoft area of Koohrang in Chaharmahal and Bakhtiari Province. Historical events, including the discovery of oil in the 20th century, led some Movri groups to migrate to Masjed Soleyman, Andika, Izeh, Shushtar, other areas of Khuzestan Province, and even Isfahan.

Earlier, during the reign of Nader Shah, many Bakhtiari migrated to Kandahar; about 500 of them were from the Movri clan. They settled in Afghanistan, gradually adopting Dari Persian with a Herati dialect. Like their relatives in western Iran, they maintained a nomadic lifestyle.

== Social structure ==
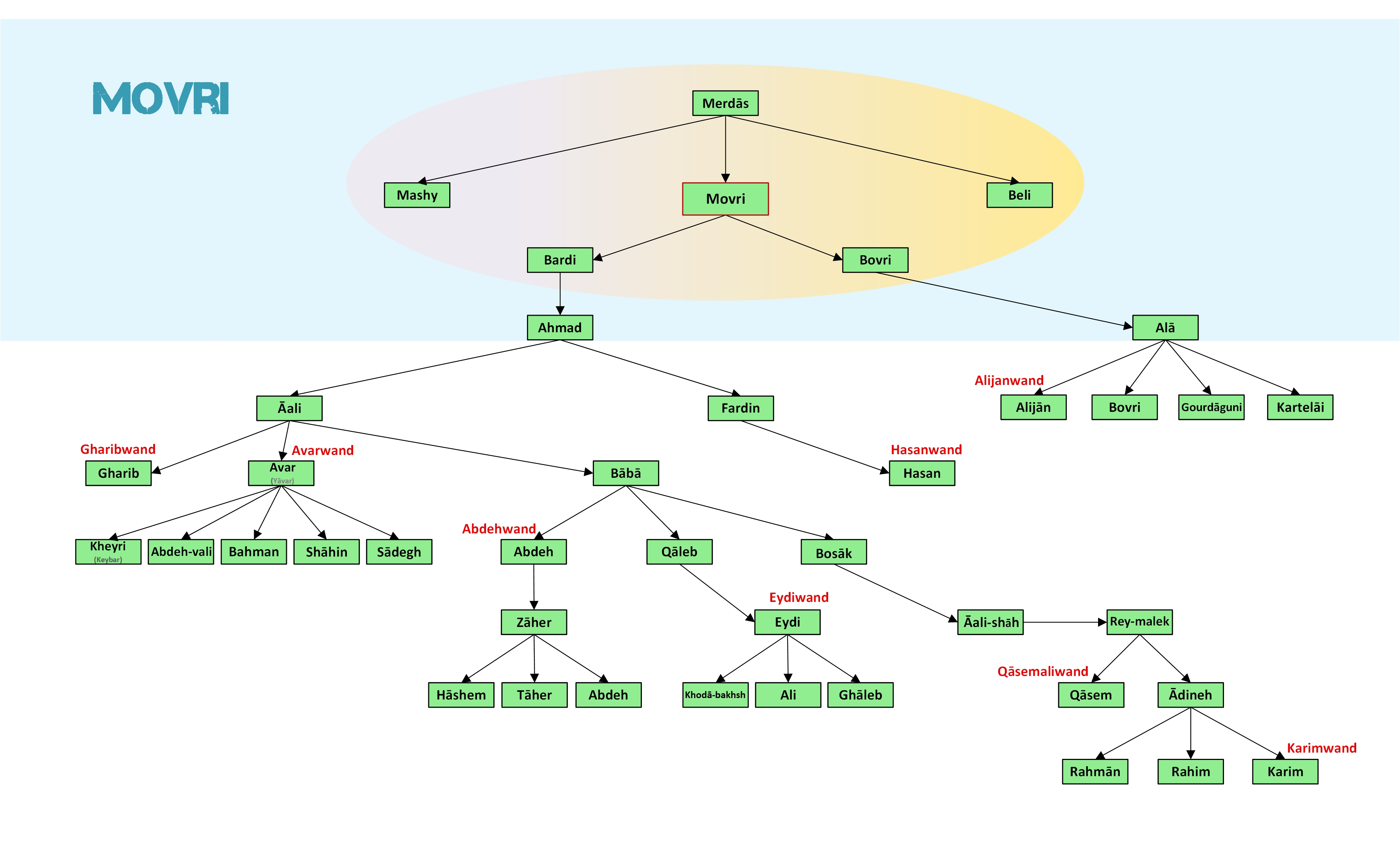
Genealogy of the Movri clan ancestors

The Movri tribe, like other Bakhtiari clans, is organized into hierarchical units such as families, sub-tribes, lineages, and clans. Notable lineages include:

- Ali-Janwand
- Gharibwand
- Gourdaguni
- Avarwand
- Hasanwand
- Abdeh-wand
- Eydiwand
- Qasem-Aliwand
- Karimwand
- Mohammadwand
- Kartalai
- Bovri
- ...

== Lifestyle ==
Today, some Movri families continue a nomadic lifestyle. They spend summers in mountainous areas such as Bazoft and winters in warmer regions including Andika, Masjed Soleyman, Shushtar, and Izeh. Seasonal migration can cover distances up to 300 kilometers.

== Culture and heritage ==
Movri people, like other Bakhtiari tribes, maintain traditional culture, music, ritual dances such as Choobazi, and traditional Bakhtiari clothing. Historically, the use of Sang-Shir (stone markers) on the graves of elders denoted social status.

== Historical role ==
The Bakhtiari, especially the Haft Lang branch that includes the Movri clan, were active in the Persian Constitutional Revolution. Leaders from various Bakhtiari clans, including Movri, participated, including cavalry units accompanying Ali-Qoli Khan Sardār Asad on the march to Tehran.
