= Mohammad Khan Zand (general) =

18th century Persian commander

- محمد خان زند
- Died: Summer 1758; Mazandaran
- Cause of death: Execution
- Relatives: Karim Khan Zand, Shaykh Ali Khan Zand
- Military career
- Allegiance: Zand Iran
- Service years: 1747-1756
- Rank: General
- Conflicts: Siege of Kermanshah; Battle of Kazzaz

Mohammad Khan Zand (Persian: محمد خان زند) was an important 18th century Persian commander of the Zand dynasty and cousin of Karim Khan Zand. He was highly successful until his capture and execution by the Qajars.

== Career ==
During the Zand remigration from Khorasan and back to Pari & Kamazan, Mohammad Khan Zand accompanied his brother Shaykh Ali Khan and Karim. He was later invested as protector of the Western Zagros territories around 1751/1752.

During the Nahavand campaign of Ali Mardan Khan during which he was defeated by Karim, Mohammad Khan Zand was sent to attack Ali Mardan near Kermanshah via Hamadan and impetuously attacked his encampment with a contingent of 70 cavalry was driven off. He was then defeated near Hajjiabad and had to fall back to the main force near Isfahan.

During the successful Siege of Kermanshah, Mohammad Khan Zand commanded the Zand force. He attempted to encircle the city and utilized shock attacks, but was ultimately unsuccessful until Ali Mardan Khan's defeat that demoralized the defenders and brought the fortress to fall. Mohammad Khan's success was reverted after he, along with many other commanders failed to coordinate when Karim Khan Zand engaged Azad Khan Afghan out of hubris. Azad penetrated into Western Iran and took Kermanshah, Isfahan, Deh Pari, Qomeshah and Shiraz. Mohammad deserted and resorted to guerilla operations in the Zagros. When Azad Khan Afghan took Deh Pari, he tricked Shaykh Ali and Mohammad Khan into leaving, and the two were captured.

Mohammad Khan and Shaykh Ali then somehow shook off their chains and released the others, with the officers Shokr 'Ali and Safar 'Ali Khan killing 'Alam Khan with a pistol. They then took 70 mules and escaped before they could be caught, reaching Borujerd where they met Karim Khan and regrouped, motivating more people from other tribes like the Kurds, Qaraguzlu, Khodabandalu and Feyli Lurs to join the army.

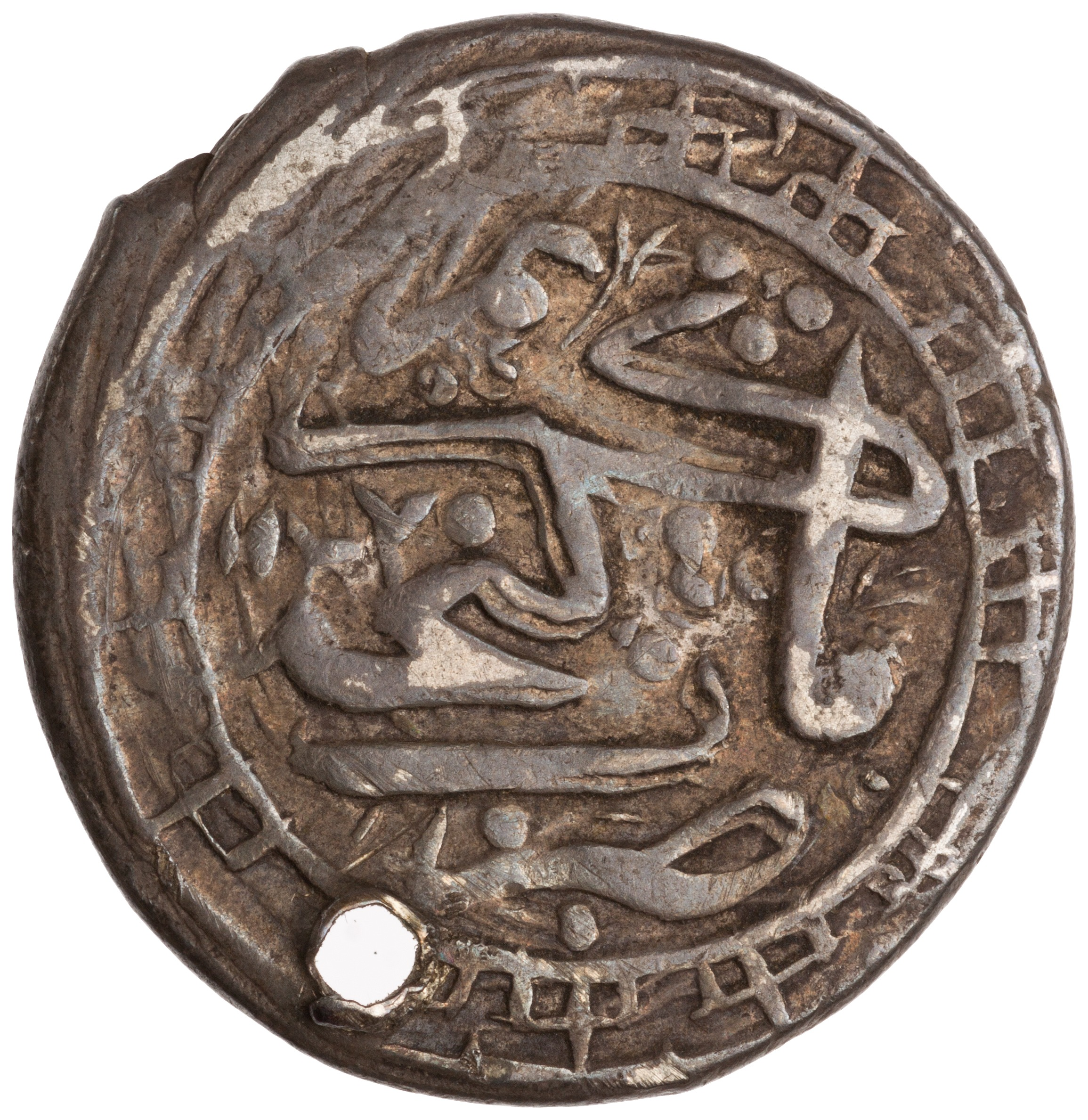
Coin of Karim Khan Zand minted in Ganja (obverse)

A force under 'Abdollah Khan Afghan failed to dislodge them at Khorramabad, but they were soon forced to flee in Spring of 1754 when Fath-Ali Khan was sent after them and most of Karim's allies left. Kamar Khan, Karim and some other Zands in the small band left held Fath-Ali off while Karim fled from Do-ab to Chamchamal then to Fars, splitting up with Mohammad Khan and Sheykh Ali.

Mohammad and Shaykh coordinated their efforts in killing Ali Mardan Khan in Spring 1754 in a surprise attack after he forced them to join his camp and established an army of 10,000 consisting of Vand, Zangana and Kalhor tribesmen. This force was bolstered by an additional 25,000 Laks after Haydar Khan Zangana agreed to collaborate with Mohammad Khan; using this force they recaptured Kermanshah and demolished the remaining fortifications there.

Mohammad Khan cleared Western Iran of the last Afghan forces and intercepted a loot train commanded by Shahbaz Khan Donboli that was headed for Urmiya. In the Winter of 1754/55 he attacked the fortress of Valashgerd under the command of Mehr Ali Khan Tekkelu's brothers, 'Abd ol-Ghaffar Aqasi Soltan and 'Abdol-Jabbar Soltan. He filled the moat with straws and hurdles, scaled the walls with ladders and took the fort with heavy casualties. He demolished the fortress and killed the garrison members, suddenly moving south to Khuzestan and pillaging the area before marching in the direction of Fars to regroup with Karim.

When Mohammad Hasan Khan Qajar pinned Azad Khan down and allowed the Zands to recapture large amounts of territory, Mohammad Khan defeated Fath-Ali Khan Afshar and nearly recaptured Hamadan in 1755. However, the Zands were soon subject to the invasion of the Qajars under Mohammad Hasan Khan Qajar, and Shaykh Ali and Mohammad Khan were caught outnumbered and defeated. Mohammad Khan was captured at the Battle of Kazzaz when his horse was shot under him.

Mohammad Khan was taken into captivity with four other Zand officers, and Mohammad was executed in Summer 1758 after he failed to escape captivity in Mazandaran.

== See also ==
- Karim Khan Zand
- Mohammad Hasan Khan Qajar
- Battle of Kazzaz
- Siege of Kermanshah
- Zand campaigns in Kurdistan and Luristan

== Sources ==
- Perry, John R. (1 December 2012). Karim Khan Zand. University of Chicago Press. ISBN 9781780741994.
