= Kuhgilu (tribe) =

Lur tribe in Iran

کهگیلو
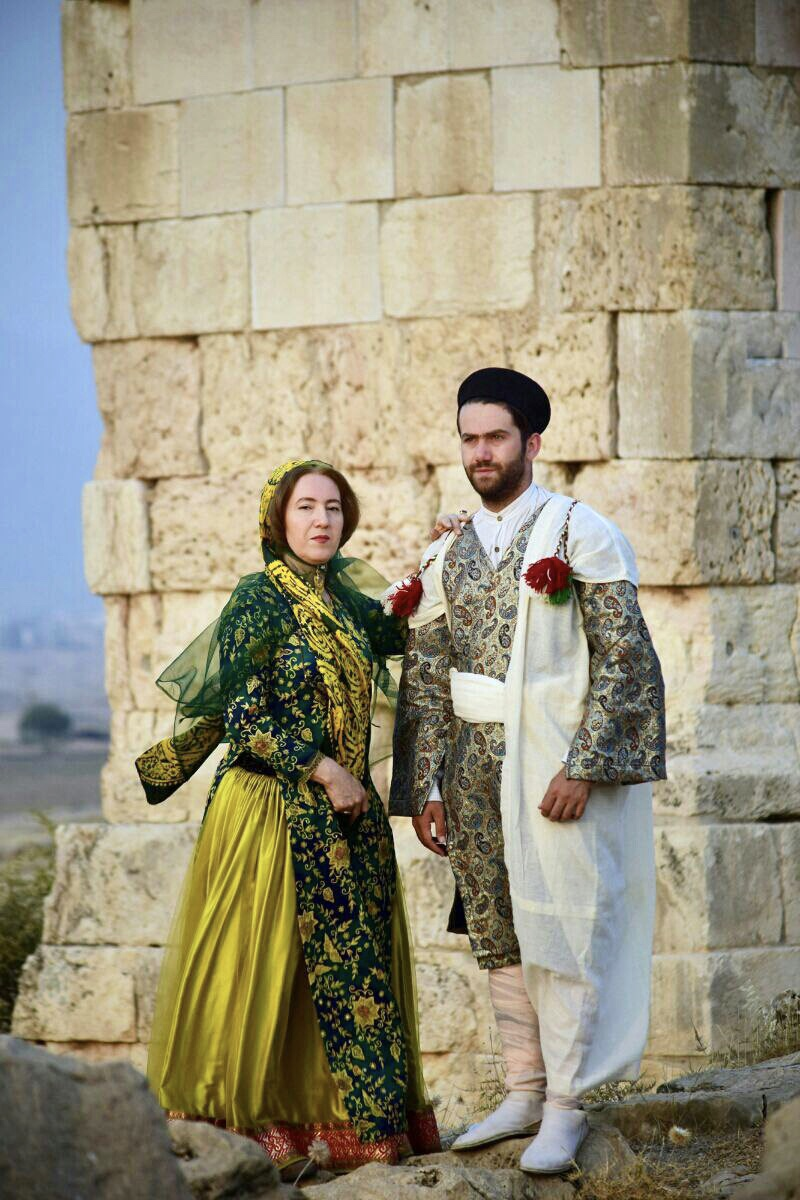
- Kuhgilu tribespeople in traditional clothing

Regions with significant populations
- Mainly Kohgiluyeh and Boyer-Ahmad province, parts of Khuzestan province, Fars province, Bushehr province, and Isfahan province

Languages
- Southern Luri, Persian

Religion
- Predominantly Shia Islam

Related ethnic groups
- Other Lur tribes

The Kuhgilu, Kuhgilu'i, Kuhgiluyeh, or Kuhgiluya and Boir Ahmadi, are a collection of Lur tribes from the historic region of Kuhgilu in Iran. They mainly live in Kohgiluyeh and Boyer-Ahmad province, as well as parts of Khuzestan, Fars, Bushehr, and Isfahan provinces. They make up one of the main subdivisions of Lurs. The tribes speak various dialects of Southern Luri.

== History ==
The region of Kuhgilu was historically part of Lur-e-Bozorg. After the Safavid era, Lur-e-Bozorg was divided into the regions of Bakhtiari and Kuhgilu. Later, in the 18th century, the Mamasani occupied Shulestan, creating a third Lur territory known as Mamasani, located between Kuhgilu and Shiraz. Mamasani was located to the east of Kuhgilu, and both regions were historically part of Fars province. The region of Kuhgilu stretched from Basht to Behbahan, the traditional center of the tribes of Kuhgilu. To the south, the tribes or Kuhgilu extended as far as the Persian Gulf.

Vladimir Minorsky described the Kuhgilu as Lurs with a considerable Turkic element, and wrote that the Lurs consisted of the Bakhtiari, Mamasani, Kuhgilu, and Lur proper. He added that the Kuhgilu comprised the tribes of Aqajari, Bavi, and Jaki, and that the three-fold division of the Kuhgilu was typical for many other Lur tribes. The Aqajari were diversely of Turkic and Lur origins, while the Bavi were said to be of Arab origin (although there was a mountain with the same name near Khorramabad), and the Jaki were of Lur origin. Others included the Mamasani as part of the Kuhgilu. In the 1960s, the inhabitants of the Kohgiluyeh and Boyerahmad province were divided into three tribal groups, the Jaki, Bavi, and Aqajari. The tribes still existing in the province in the early 1980s were listed as the Boyerahmadi, Cherami, Bavi (Babu'i), Doshmanziari, Tayyebi, and Bahma'i. The tribes spoke their own dialects of Southern Luri. Among the dialects, the Boyerahmadi dialect was spoken around Yasuj, the Kohgiluyeh dialect was spoken around Dehdasht, and the Liravi dialect was spoken around northern Bushehr province.

John W. Limbert linked the Kuhgilu to the historic tribe of Jiloya, mentioned by Istakhri as one of the five tribes of the Kurds of Fars, while clarifying that they were not Kurds but Lurs who spoke southwestern Iranian dialects, and that there was no basic distinction between the northwestern Kurdish dialects and the southwestern Luri dialects before the 20th century. The dynasty known as the Giluwayhids historically controlled the entrance to the Kuhgilu region and were described as being rivals of the ruling Tahirids.

In 1757, Karim Khan Zand began a campaign to impose his authority in Behbahan. He blockaded and sacked the city, and then besieged Jayezan for eight months until it fell. Much of the Kuhgilu were pacified in 1757. When Karim Khan was visiting Azerbaijan in 1760, one of his governors over the Kuhgilu Lurs had revolted, and was later captured, but the Kuhgilu region remained outside of Zand control until spring 1765 when Karim Khan returned from Khuzestan and all tribes submitted to him except the Liravi. The Liravi desperately protected their two fortresses near Behbehan, which fell to the Zands after high casualties on both sides. The Zands did not give any leniency to the Liravi, killing the prisoners and building towers out of their skulls. In Tarikh-i Gitigusha, the historian Nami Isfahani frequently condemned specific Zand dynasty figures for causing anarchy and instability, although he also criticized the Kuhgilu Lurs, calling them "savage-natured, beast-dispositioned, and fox-like deceivers," who deserved their punishment from Karim Khan.

Around 1966, they were rapidly integrated into the economic, administrative, educational and media networks of the state, which came with an influx of non-Lurs to the region and a loss of some cultural traditions.

== Tribes ==
The numerous Kuhgilu tribes were generally divided into three main groups, the Jaki, Bavi, and Aqajari.

=== Jaki ===
The Jaki were divided into the Chaharbonicha and the Liravi. The former consisted of the Boyerahmadi, Cherami, Doshmanziari, and Nu'i, while the latter consisted of the Liravi of the plain and the Liravi of the mountain. The Liravi of the mountain included the tribes of Bahma'i, Tayyebi, Shir Ali, and Yusufi.

=== Boyerahmadi ===
The Boyerahmadi tribe itself pronounced the name as "Beiramad". Some local linguists suggested that "Beiramad" was unrelated to the name of Ahmad, despite its official recognition as such. The Boyerahmadi were historically the largest tribe, and consisted of the tribes of Tamoradi, Qaid Givi, Gudarzi, Aqa'i (including Narmabi, Zengeva'i, and Babakhani), Dashtemawri (including Owlad-e Mirza-Ali, Shaykh, and Tas-Ahmadi), and around 15 tribes of sayyid origin, including the Sadat-e Imamzadeh-Ali, Sadat-e Mahmudi, and Sadat-e Reza Tawfiq. Other important ones were the Jalili, Negintaji, and Sistakhi. Additionally, there were around forty smaller tribes, two thirds of which were named after their native region, like the Chitabi tribe named after the village of Chitab. The Boyerahmadi tribes, in a partially overlapping manner, were divided across three political entities, Boyerahmadi Garmsir, Boyerahmadi Sardsir-e Olya, and Boyerahmadi Sardsir-e Sofla. There were around 70 Boyerahmadi tribes. The Aqajari which remained nomadic were later absorbed by the Boyerahmadi, in which they became known as the Aqa'i tribe, and consisted of the tribes of Jama Bozorgi, Tileku, Jaghata'i, Begdeli, Afshar, Lor Zaban, She'ri, Aqbaghi, Bashiri, Daylami, Gashtil, and Davudi. Some retained Turkic, but most spoke Luri and Persian.

=== Cheram ===
The Cheram or Chorum tribe, in the 1890s, consisted of the tribes of Begler (the tribe of the Cheram chief), Bonari, Parukhuri (or Parvkhuri), Tarmuni, Hosam-Bahauddini, Dilgun, Shaykh Golbar, Goshtasb, Kamankeshi, and Masih-Shahi. Their names also suggested diverse Turkic and Lur origins.

=== Bahma'i ===
The Bahma'i tribe was divided into the Sardsiri, traditionally centered around Dishmuk, and the Garmsiri, traditionally centered around Qal'a-ye A'la. After a leadership dispute, the Bahma'i were divided into the tribes of Bahma'i Ahmadi and the Bahma'i Mohammadi.

=== Bavi ===
The Bavi or Babu'i tribe, which spoke Luri, was commonly claimed to be an offshoot of the Arab Bawiya tribe of Khuzestan, although Minorsky suggested a connection with the mountain south of Khorramabad named Bavi. The Bavi were relatively smaller than the other tribes of Kuhgilu. Kayhan wrote that the Bavi tribe consisted of the tribes of as Ali-Shahi, Gashin, Musa'i, Bar-Aftabi, and Qal'ayi.

=== Doshmanziari ===
The Doshmanziari tribe of the Kuhgilu tribes was distinct from the Doshmanziari tribe historically associated with the Mamasani. The Doshmanziari of Kuhgilu was one of the four components of the Chaharbonicha tribal confederation, alongside the Boyerahmadi, Cheram, and Nu'i (Novi). The Doshmanziari was divided into four tribes, the Elyasi, Bavardinari, Sadat, and Novi. The Elyasi included the clans of Shir-Mohammadi, Ra'is, Goshtasbi, Khwaja, Koli, and Shah-Hosayni, the Bavardinari included the clans of Qalandari, Buyri, Shaykh-Ali, and Soltan-Ali, the Sadat included the clans of Sadat-e Esmaili, Sadat-e Abbasi, Sadat-e Mashhadi, Sadat-e Kordli, and Sadat-e 'Ala'i.
