= Bahma'i (tribe) =

Lur tribe from southern Iran

بهمئی
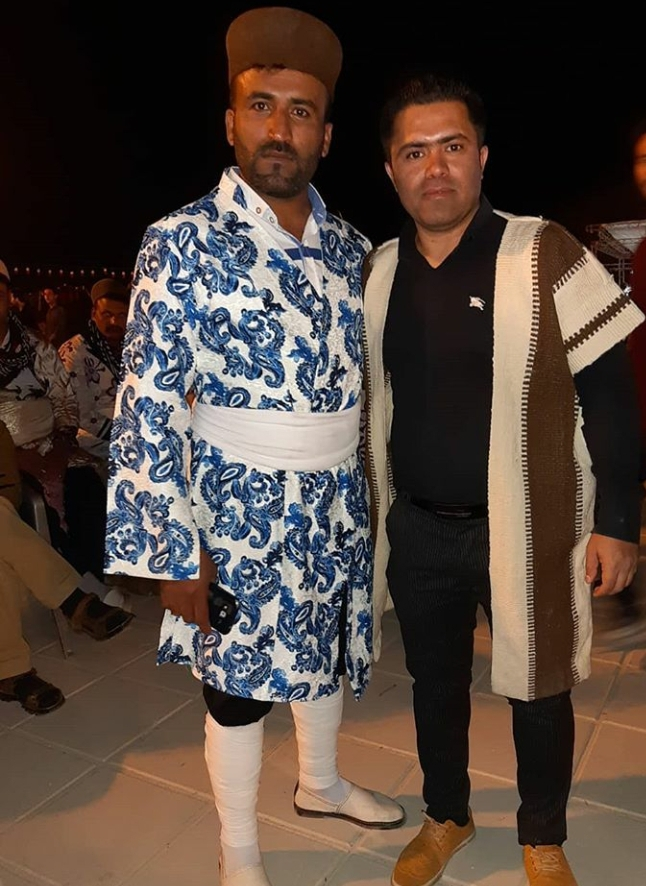
- Bahma'i tribesmen in traditional clothing

Total population
- 500,000

Regions with significant populations
- Iran

Languages
- Southern Luri, Persian

Religion
- Shia Islam

Related ethnic groups
- Other Lurs

The Bahma'i (Persian: بهمئی) are a Lur tribe and one of the main tribes of Kuhgilu. The Bahma'i live primarily in southwestern Iran, mainly across the provinces of Khuzestan and Kohgiluyeh and Boyer-Ahmad. The Bahma'i traditionally speak the Bahma'i dialect of Southern Luri, and Persian.

== History ==
The Bahma'i belonged to the Kuhgilu Lurs and traditionally lived around the Behbahan region and were historically one of the largest and most powerful tribes until the second half of the 19th century. Layard and C. A. de Bode both visited the Bahma'i at the same time in 1840, and were both impressed by the refractoriness and energy of the Bahma'i tribal raiders. Their population at that time was estimated between 2,000 and 3,000 families. The Bahma'i were considered part of the Liravi-yi Kuh section of the Liravi tribe, which itself was part of the Jaki tribe of Kuhgilu.

The last significant leader of the Bahma'i was Khalil Khan, who lived in and ruled directly from the fortress of Qaḷʿa-ye Aʿlā, located 53 km northwest of Behbahan). During his lifetime, his eldest son Jafar Khan built the two strongholds of Qaḷʿa-ye Aʿlā and Dīšmūk, located 20 km east of Qaḷʿa-ye Aʿlā, and since then, the Bahma'i were divided between the Garmsiri, centered at Qaḷʿa-ye ʿAlā, and the Sardsiri, centered at Dīšmūk. After the death of Khalil Khan in the late 19th century, there was a struggle for the succession between his sons and the sons of his brother Mohammad-Hosayn Khan. During the conflict, Mohammad-Ali Khan, a son of Mohammad-Hosayn Khan, killed Jafar Khan and declared himself the new Bahma'i chief. But forty days later, he was killed by a son of Jafar Khan. These two murders and the ensuing feud led to the division of the Bahma'i tribe into the tribes of Bahma'i Mohammadi and Bahma'i Ahmadi. However, they continued their raids and retained their warlike reputation. The Bahma'i Ahmadi were again divided into the Bahma'i Ahmadi Posht-e Kuh and Bahma'i Ahmadi Zir-e Kuh.

The Bahma'i were sometimes incorrectly grouped with the neighboring Bakhtiari, although both were Lur. Both groups also lived around Izeh. The Bahma'i and Bakhtiari historically had strong rivalries. Hasan Fasa'i wrote that ten Bahma'i riflemen were worth a hundred Bakhtiari ones. Fasa'i, G. Demorgny, and M. Kayhan all estimated the Bahma'i population 3,000 families, and according to Pierre Oberling, they were scattered scattered over a wide area covering the Bahmai County but had thoroughly blended with the local population which made it no longer possible accurately estimate their population.
