= Abu'l-Fath Khan Bakhtiari =

Supreme chieftain of the Bakhtiari tribe

Abu'l-Fath Khan Bakhtiari (Persian: ابوالفتح خان بختیاری, romanized: Abōlfatḥ Khān-e Bakhtīārī) was the Bakhtiari supreme chieftain (ilkhani) of the Haft Lang branch.

== Biography ==
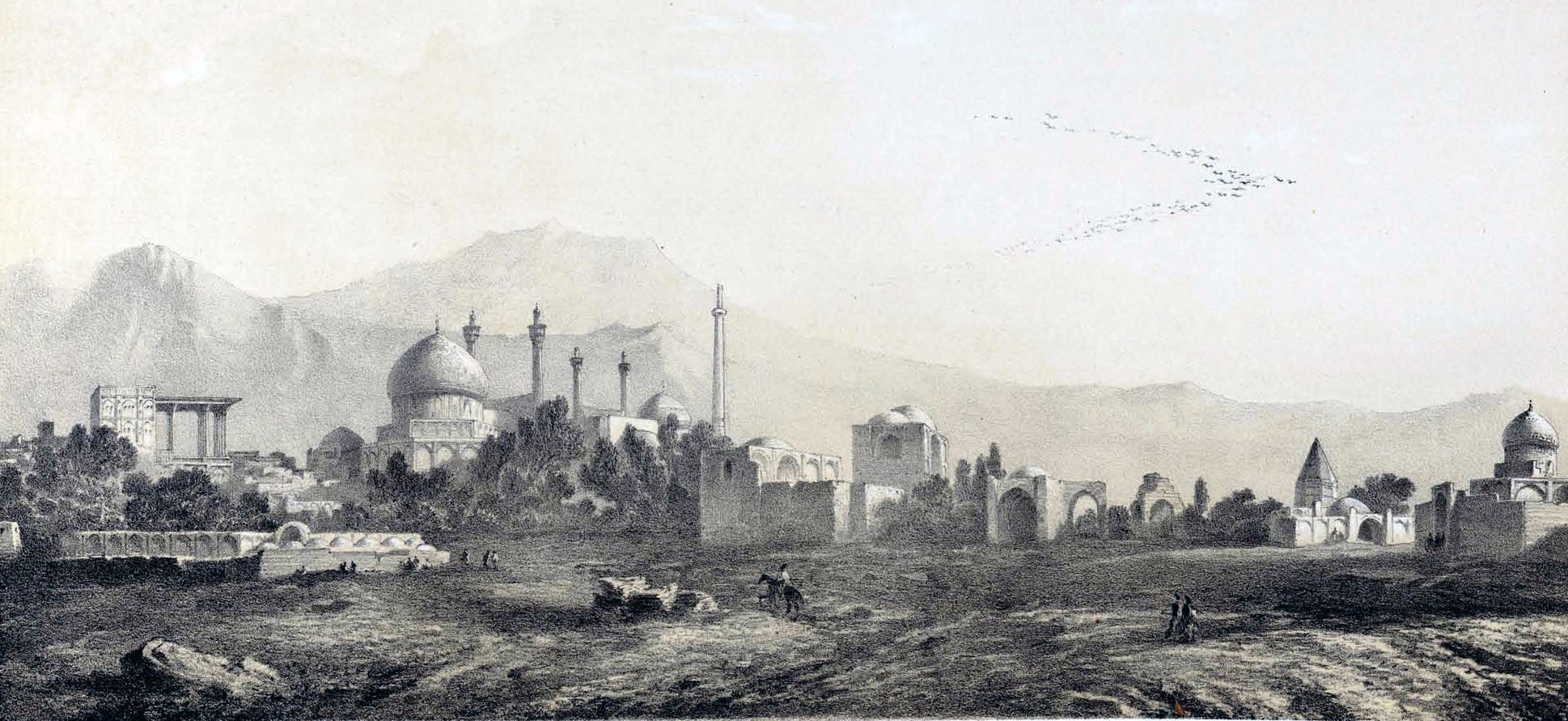
An illustration of Isfahan from the south.

He was the governor of Isfahan at the time of the death of Nader Shah (r. 1736–1747) in 1747—the latter's successors, Adil Shah, Ebrahim Shah, and Shahrokh Shah, continued to acknowledge Abu'l-Fath's post as governor of the city. When the Chahar Lang chieftain Ali Mardan Khan Bakhtiari and the Zand chieftain Karim Khan stormed the gates of Isfahan in May 1750—Abu'l-Fath and other prominent residents assembled to protect the fortress of the city, but agreed to surrender and collaborate with them after Ali Mardan's reasonable proposals. Abu'l-Fath, together with Ali Mardan and Karim Khan, formed an alliance in western Iran under the cover of restoring the Safavid dynasty, appointing a 17 year old Safavid prince, Abu Turab, as a puppet ruler—on June 29, Abu Turab was declared shah, and assumed the name of Ismail III.

Ali Mardan then took the title of Vakil-e daulat ("deputy of the state") as the head of the administration, while Abu'l-Fath maintained his post as governor of Isfahan, and Karim Khan was appointed commander (sardar) of the army, and was given the task of conquering the rest of Iran. However, a few months later, while Karim Khan was on an expedition in Kurdistan, the ambitious Ali Mardan had Abu'l-Fath deposed and killed.

== Sources ==
- Perry, John R. (2011). "Karim Khan Zand". Encyclopaedia Iranica, Vol. XV, Fasc. 6. pp. 561–564.
- Perry, John (1991). "The Zand dynasty". The Cambridge History of Iran, Vol. 7: From Nadir Shah to the Islamic Republic. Cambridge: Cambridge University Press. pp. 1–63. ISBN 9780521200950.
- Perry, John R. (1983). "Abu'l-Fath Khan Bakhtiari". Archived copy. Encyclopaedia Iranica, Vol. I, Fasc. 3. p. 285. Archived from the original on 2013-05-16.
- Garthwaite, Gene R. (2005). The Persians. Wiley. pp. 1–311. ISBN 9781557868602.

Unknown	Governor of Isfahan before 1747–1750	Succeeded by Ali Mardan Khan Bakhtiari
