= Avarwand =

Avarwand (Yāvar-wand) (Persian: اوروند, romanized: Avarwand) is one of the well-known subgroups of the Movri tribe among the Bakhtiari people, who belong to the Iranian peoples Haftlang Bakhtiaris in present-day Iran. This subgroup, like other Bakhtiaris in the past, lived as nomads and migrated between Khuzestan and Chaharmahal and Bakhtiari.
