= Abu'l-Fath (disambiguation) =

Abu'l-Fath was 14th-century Samaritan chronicler.

Abu'l-Fath may also refer to:

- Abu'l-Fath Musa, 11th-century Shaddadid emir
- Abu'l-Fath an-Nasir ad-Dailami (died 1053), 11th-century Yemeni imam
- Abu'l Fath of Sarmin, emir of Apamea in 1106
- Abu'l-Fath Omar ibn Ibrahim al-Khayyam, better known as Omar Khayyam (d. 1131), Persian poet
- Abu'l-Fath Abd al-Rahman Mansur al-Khazini, better known as al-Khazini, 12th-century astronomer
- Abu'l-Fath Yusuf, 12th-century Ghaznavid vizier
- Abu'l-Fath Nasr Allah ibn 'Abd Allah, bette known as Ibn Ḳalāḳis (d. 1172), Egyptian poet and traveller
- Abu'l-Fath Jalal-ud-din Muhammad Akbar, better known as Akbar (d. 1605), Mughal emperor
- Abu'l-Fath Khan Bakhtiari, 18th-century Bakhtiari chieftain
