= Agacheri =

Turkmen tribe in Turkey and Iran

Regions with significant populations
- Iran: Khuzestan; Turkey (as Tahtacı): Aegean, Mediterranean Regions

Languages
- In Iran: Luri, Persian, Turkic; In Turkey (as Tahtacı): Turkish

Religion
- Shia Islam, Alevism

Agacheri was a Turkoman tribe that inhabited parts of Anatolia until the 14th century. They were allied with the Qara Qoyunlu during the 14–15th centuries but later shifted their allegiance to the Aq Qoyunlu upon the downfall of the former. A portion of the tribe remained in Anatolia and split into smaller subgroups, while another branch migrated to Iran, where they additionally incorporated Lurs. The tribe is known by its historical name in Iran. Although it has been contested by later publications due to lack of primary evidence, it is conventionally considered to be connected to the Tahtacı in Turkey.

== Etymology ==
The name of the tribe was attested by multiple medieval sources. Twelfth–thirteenth-century Ilkhanid historian Rashid al-Din Hamadani pointed out that the tribe's name was not mentioned in earlier works and referred to an Oghuz group that settled in the forested areas of the Near East, which earned its name. The term means "people of the forest" in Turkic languages. Present-day members of the tribe in Iran, primarily those who do not speak Turkic, hold that the name originates in the terms agha (gentleman) and jari (bold), which are lexical borrowings that entered Persian from Turkic.

== History ==
=== Origins ===
Some sources relate the tribe's origins to the Akatziri tribe that inhabited Russia in the 5th century. However, medieval historians (Note: Including Izz al-Din ibn Shaddad, Abu al-Faraj, Rashid al-Din Hamadani, Aziz ibn Ardashir-i Astarabadi, Badr al-Din al-Ayni, and al-Maqrizi.) attest to the tribe's Turkmen origin. Historian Faruk Sümer suggests that Agacheri may be related to the Turkmens who previously initiated the Babai revolt as they inhabited the same region around Malatya. In 1246, tribesmen were known to have fought against Baiju Noyan (r. 1241–1247, 1251–1255), the commander of the Mongol Empire in the Near East. A group of the tribe was the dominant population near Khalkhal, Iran, where they neighbored the Daylamites and are thought to have been brought to the region following the capture of Alamut by Hulegu Khan (r. 1256–1265), a Mongol commander who was the founder of the Ilkhanate after the division of the Mongol Empire.

=== Relations with the Qara Qoyunlu and Aq Qoyunlu ===
During the second half of the 14th century, the tribe forged an alliance with the Qara Qoyunlu. Its head at the time, Hasan, was the son of Tatar Khatun, who was the sister of Qara Mahammad (r. 1380–1389), the ruler of the Qara Qoyunlu. In the next century, the tribe migrated to Iran along with the Qara Qoyunlu tribe. Members of the tribe, Husayn, Sulan, and Ali Beg were chieftains loyal to the Qara Qoyunlu ruler Iskandar (r. 1421–1429, 1431–1436). Ali Beg was among the ranks of the Qara Qoyunlu forces in the skirmish against the Aq Qoyunlu tribe in 1450. He was captured but later released by the Aq Qoyunlu.

Upon the downfall of the Qara Qoyunlu, Ali Beg and various other Agacheri chieftains entered the Aq Qoyunlu ruler Uzun Hasan's (r. 1453–78) service. Agacheri tribesmen continued to serve various Aq Qoyunlu chieftains, such as Hajji Hasan and Dündar-i Ahaj Eri who served Jahan Shah Mirza and Uzun Hasan's son Zeynel Mirza, respectively.

=== Iran ===
Agacheri is not mentioned in contemporary Safavid primary sources, namely chronicles. When Tabriz temporarily came under Ottoman control in the first half of the 18th century, a tahrir defter (cadastral survey) attested to a nearby village that was the namesake of the tribe of Agacheri. Another homonymous village lay near Garni according to the Ottoman records.

Much of the tribe was forced to transition into a sedentary life in Behbahan in c. 1820 in order to defend the town from the violent tribes of Bakhtiari and Boir Ahmadi. The nomadic portions of Agacheri were eventually absorbed by the latter and became known as Aqa'i. In the mid-19th century, Agacheri appeared in records as a wealthy tribe of 1000 tents (households) in Fars province incorporating the sub-tribes of Chaghatai and Kashtil. By the next century, the tribe was known to be inhabiting Kohgiluyeh and included the sub-tribes of Afshar, Begdili, and Tileku.

They were generally considered Lurs of Turkic origin. Historian Pierre Oberling describes the Agacheri of Kohgiluyeh as a tribe of mixed origin inhabiting Khuzestan. Vladimir Minorsky classified them as part of the Kohgiluyeh Lurs, however he mentioned that it was composed of the Turkic tribes of Afshar, Chaghatai, Begdili, and Qarabaghi. Other sources from around the turn of the 20th century, Iranian and French authors, Hasan Fasa'i and Gustave Demorgny, referred to them as an "amalgamation of Turkic, Tajik, and Lur elements." Oberling links some of the constituent tribes to the Afshars of Khuzestan, who Shah Abbas the Great (r. 1587–1629) had scattered over the region following a rebellion in 1596–1597. Oberling further proposes a tie between the Agacheri of Kohgiluyeh and the Qashqai Kashkuli Bozorg tribe of western Fars as both incorporate the sub-tribes of Begdili and Jama Bozorg.

Demorgny put the population of Agacheri around Behbahan at 2000 families in 1913. Oberling noted that the number was over 1000 in the 1950s. It consisted of the following sub-tribes: Jama Bozorgi, Tileku, Chaghatai, Begdili, Afshar, Lor Zaban, She'ri, Aqbaghi, Bashiri, Daylami, Kashtil, and Davudi. A portion of the tribe retained their Turkic language, but most conversed in Persian and Luri. Many of the tribesmen have moved to Abadan, Bandar-e Mahshahr, and Aghajari, where they work under the National Iranian Oil Company.

The locations of towns in Iran.

=== Anatolia ===
The remnants of the tribe in Anatolia who did not depart for Iran split into smaller tribes for economic reasons and spread across the peninsula. Building on writer Ziya Gökalp's earlier claims, historian Faruk Sümer identified these groups with the modern-day Tahtacı, who inhabit various regions of Turkey, such as Çukurova, Mersin, Antalya, Isparta, Burdur, Konya, Muğla, Denizli, and Aydın. In parallel with Agacheri's etymological explanation, Tahtacı are known for woodworking. Sümer's claims have been repeated by later sources with no further comments on its veracity. Although he claimed that no records from the fourteenth century onwards attested to Agacheri inhabiting Anatolia, tahrir defters from the fifteenth and sixteenth centuries mention two villages identified with the tribe, one in the Gerz Yakası nahiye of the Sanjak of Kütahya and another near Sinop. According to historian Sadullah Gülten, the only socioeconomic link between the modern-day Tahtacı and an Anatolian community named Agacheri is a court register from 1737 that notes that 20 villages near Sinop, including the Agacheri's namesake settlement, traded oak and pine lumber with a galleon-manufacturing shipyard. There isn't any other evidence that such a community was involved in woodworking as previously claimed.

== Bibliography ==
- Gülten, Sadullah (Fall 2020). "Kökler ve Dallar: Tahtacı Alevilerinin Menşei ve Tahtacı Cemaatleri" [Roots and Branches: The Origins of Tahtacı Alawis and Tahtacı Communities]. Türk Kültürü ve Hacı Bektaş Veli Araştırmaları Dergisi (95): 143–167. ISSN 2147-9895.
- Oberling, Pierre (1984). "Aḡāč Erī". In Yarshater, Ehsan (ed.). Encyclopædia Iranica. Vol. I/6: Afghanistan–Ahriman. London and New York: Routledge & Kegan Paul. pp. 605–606. ISBN 978-0-71009-095-9.
- Sümer, Faruk (1988). "Ağaçeriler". TDV Encyclopedia of Islam, Vol. 1 (Âb-ı Hayat – El-ahkâmü'ş-şer'i̇yye) (in Turkish). Istanbul: Presidency of Religious Affairs, Centre for Islamic Studies. pp. 460–461. ISBN 978-975-954-801-8.
