= Ismail III =

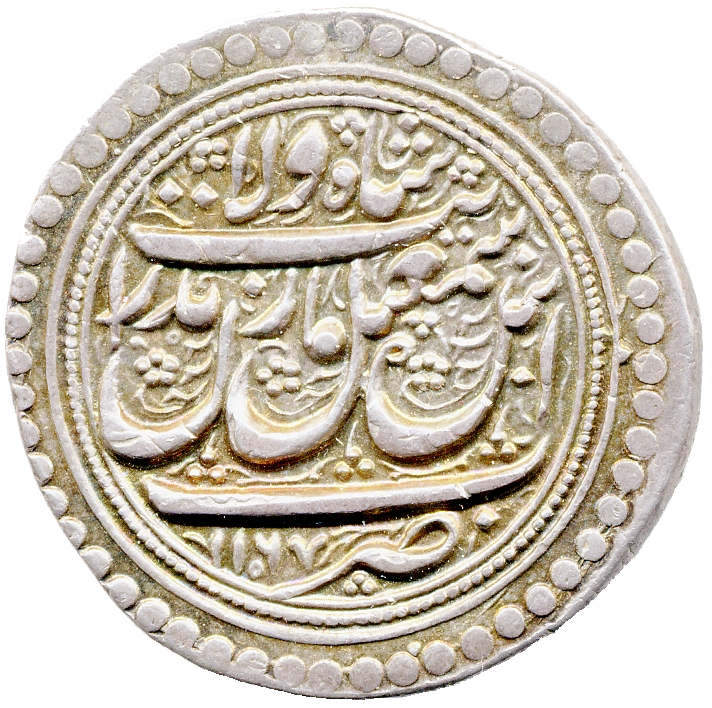
- Silver coin bearing the name of Ismail III

Shah of Iran
- Reign: 1750–1773
- Coronation: 29 June 1750
- Successor: None
- Born: 1733; Isfahan, Safavid Iran
- Died: 1773 (aged 39–40); Abadeh, Zand Iran
- Dynasty: Marashi; Safavid
- Father: Mirza Morteza
- Mother: Maryam Begum Safavi

Abu Torab (Persian: ابوتراب), better known by his dynastic name of Ismail III (اسماعیل), was a Safavid prince, who reigned as a figurehead under the authority of Ali Mardan Khan Bakhtiari briefly from 1750 to 1751, and then under the Zand ruler Karim Khan Zand from 1751 till his death in 1773.

== Biography ==
Abu Torab's father was Mirza Morteza, who was a former court official, and his mother was a daughter of the former Safavid king (shah) Sultan Husayn (r. 1694–1722).

In May 1750, the Chahar Lang chieftain Ali Mardan Khan Bakhtiari and the Zand chieftain Karim Khan stormed the gates of Isfahan—its governor Abu'l-Fath Khan Bakhtiari and other prominent residents assembled to protect the fortress of the city, but agreed to surrender and collaborate with them after Ali Mardan's reasonable proposals. Abu'l-Fath, together with Ali Mardan and Karim Khan, formed an alliance in western Iran under the cover of restoring the Safavid dynasty, appointing the 17 year old Abu Torab as a puppet ruler—on June 29, Abu Torab was declared shah, and assumed the dynastic name of Ismail III.

Ali Mardan then took the title of Vakil-e daulat ("deputy of the state") as the head of the administration, while Abu'l-Fath maintained his post as governor of Isfahan, and Karim Khan was appointed commander (sardar) of the army, and was given the task of conquering the rest of Iran. Ali Mardan eventually broke the alliance by killing Abu'l-Fath and extracting heavy tax on the inhabitants.

In January 1751, Karim Khan returned to Isfahan and restored order in the city. A battle shortly occurred between him and Ali Mardan in Luristan—during the battle, Ismail III and Zakariya Khan (who was now his vizier), together with several prominent officers, deserted Ali Mardan and joined Karim Khan, who eventually emerged victorious, forcing Ali Mardan and the remains of his men, together with the governor of Luristan, Ismail Khan Feyli, to retreat to Khuzestan. Ismail accompanied Karim during his abortive 1751 campaign against the Qajars, and became a captive of Mohammad Hasan Khan Qajar.

After Mohammad Hasan's defeat and death at the hands of the Zands, Ismail III was freed from captivity in Sari. Ismail was kept in safe custody at the stronghold of Abadeh, where he lived till his death, in 1773.

== Sources ==
- Perry, John R. (2011). "Karim Khan Zand". Encyclopaedia Iranica, Vol. XV, Fasc. 6. pp. 561–564.
- Perry, John R. (1998). "Esma'il Safawi". Encyclopaedia Iranica, Vol. VIII, Fasc. 6. p. 636.
- Perry, John (1991). "The Zand dynasty". The Cambridge History of Iran, Vol. 7: From Nadir Shah to the Islamic Republic. Cambridge: Cambridge University Press. pp. 1–63. ISBN 9780521200950.
- Garthwaite, Gene R. (2005). The Persians. Wiley. pp. 1–311. ISBN 9781557868602.
- Perry, John (1979). Karim Khan Zand: A History of Iran (1747-1779). University of Chicago Press. pp. 1–347. ISBN 9780226661025.
