= Pahlavi hat =

Iranian headwear

The Pahlavi hat (Persian: کلاه پهلوی) was an item of headgear for men introduced in the Imperial State of Iran by Reza Shah.

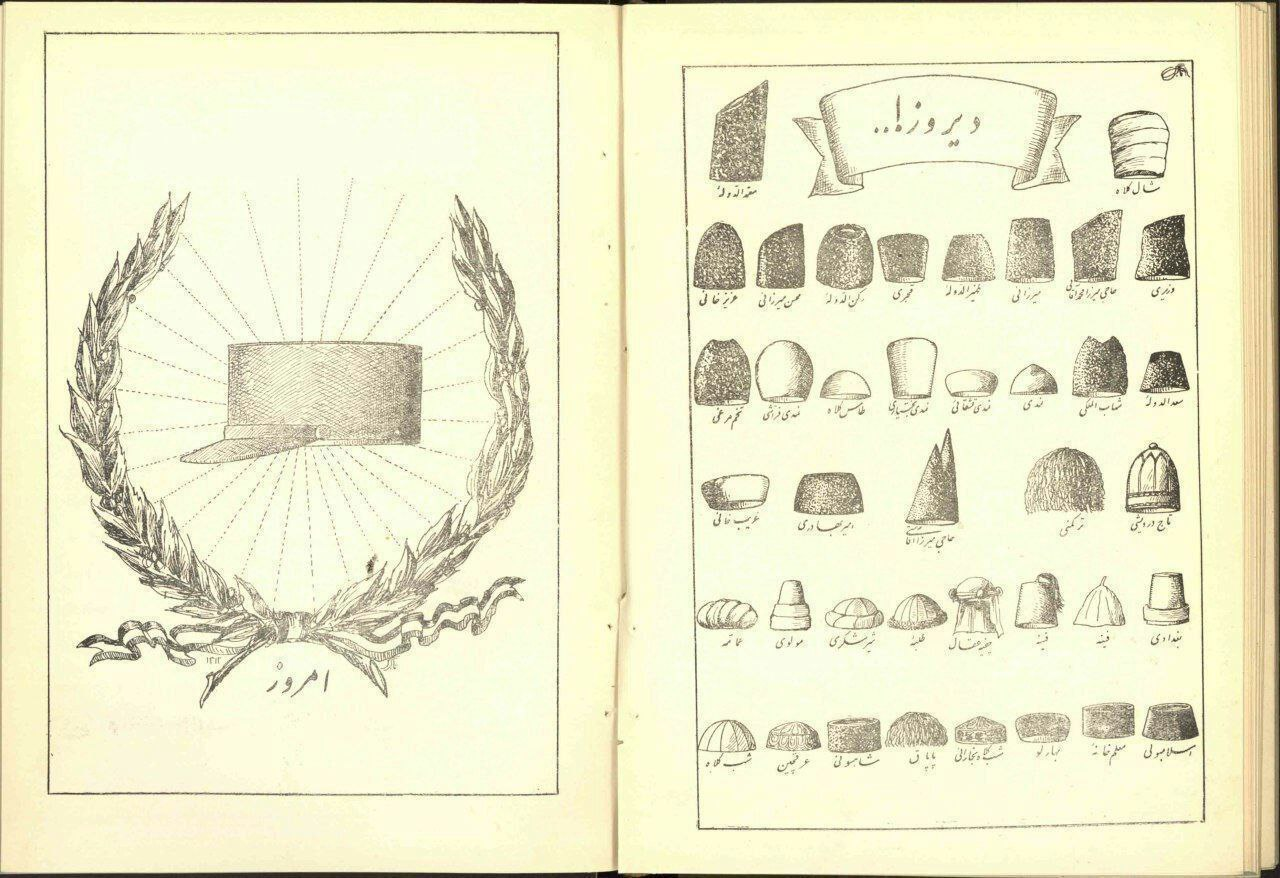
Two pages from the 1936 Pars Yearbook commemorating the replacement of Iran’s traditional, religious, and ethnic hats with the Pahlavi hat.

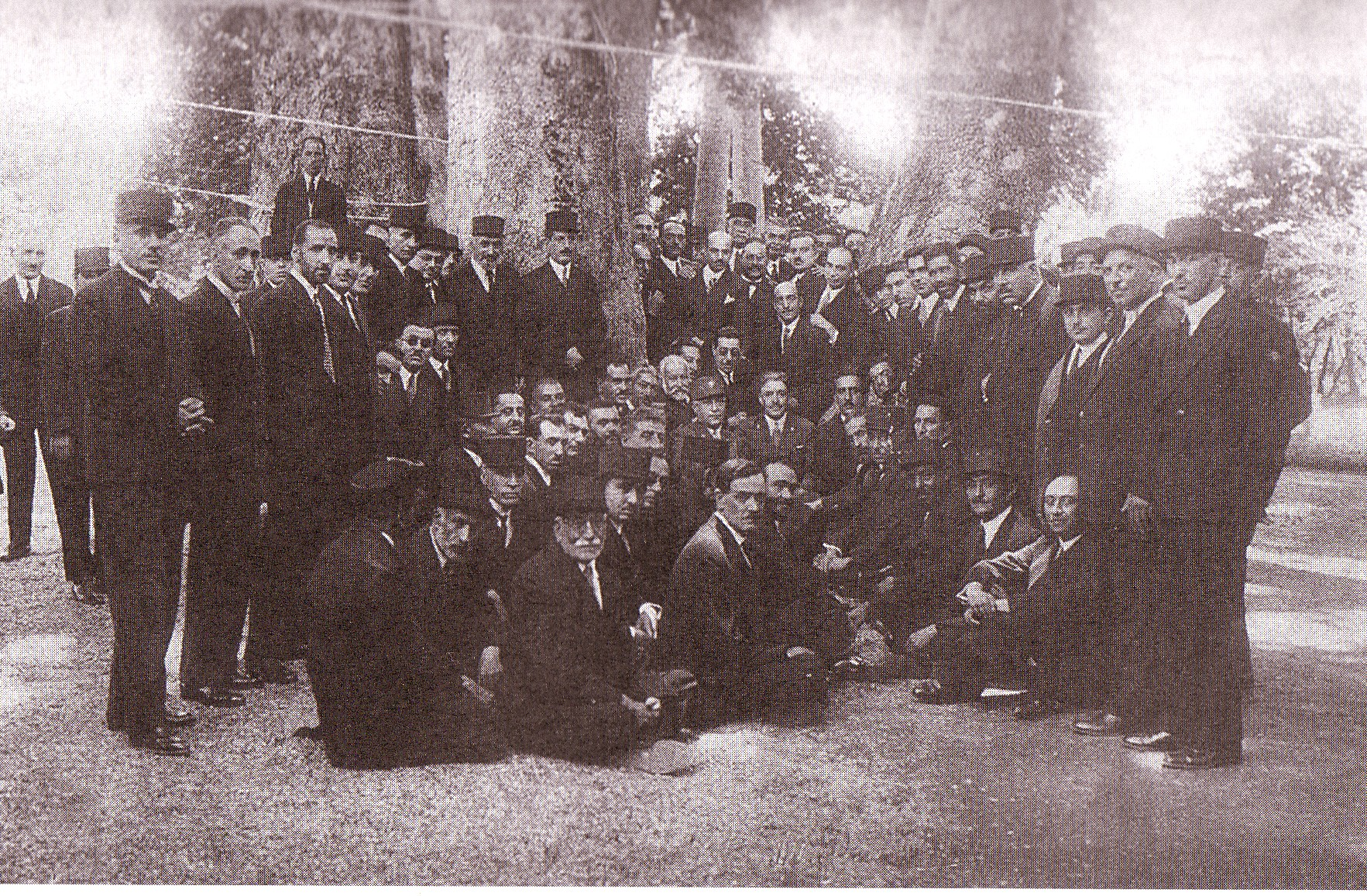
Deputies to the Eighth Majlis, many of whom are wearing the Pahlavi hat.

The introduction of the hat, in August 1927, was part of Reza Shah's drive to westernize and modernize Iran, which included introducing European-style clothing. The hat (to be worn with a European-style coat and trousers) was cylindrical with a peak, being based on the French military kepi, and was available in black or beige. The hat's peak, by obstructing the touching of the forehead to the ground during prayer, was seen as an attempt to reduce the influence of religious ritual in Iranian society (although unlike brimmed European hats it could be turned around for prayer), while its introduction across the whole of society served to efface distinctions in dress amongst different ethnic groups (the Armenians in particular objected to being made to wear it).

Although widely adopted in cities, the Pahlavi hat was initially perceived as 'foreign' and proved deeply unpopular. In April 1930, the Ruler of the Trucial State of Dubai, Sheikh Saeed Al Maktoum, notified Persian residents of the emirate that they should not wear the Pahlavi hat and that 'those who wish to wear it should return to Persia.'

Despite this, the Pahlavi hat had become widespread by the 1930s.

At the Tenth Majlis in June 1935, it was announced that the Pahlavi hat would be replaced by the fedora, a conventional European-style hat. This, along with other innovations introduced by Reza Shah's government, provoked mass demonstrations in July in the city of Mashhad, which were suppressed by the army, resulting in many deaths.

== See also ==
- Fez
