= Ali Mardan Khan Bakhtiari =

- Vakil-e daulat ("deputy of the state")
- Reign: 1750–1751
- Successor: Karim Khan Zand
- Died: Spring 1754; Near Kermanshah
- Religion: Shia Islam

Ali Mardan Khan Bakhtiari (Persian: علی‌مردان‌خان بختیاری, romanized: Alī-Mardān Khān-e Bakhtīārī) was the Bakhtiari supreme chieftain (ilkhani) of the Chahar Lang branch, and major contender for supremacy in western Iran after the death of Nader Shah in 1747.

He was the autonomous ruler of Golpayegan (1749–1751) and Isfahan (1750–1751), assuming the title of Vakil-e daulat ("deputy of the state"), with the Safavid prince Ismail III as a figurehead that legitimized his rule. He was, however, driven back by Karim Khan Zand's forces, and after a number of clashes throughout the years, was murdered by two Zand chieftains at his own encampment, in 1754.

== Biography ==
=== Aftermath of the death of Nader Shah and the Bakhtiaris return to western Iran ===
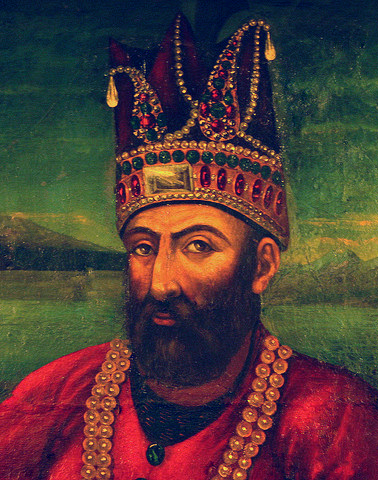
Portrait of Nader Shah, who dismantled the Safavid dynasty and started the Afsharid dynasty, ruling from 1736 to 1747.

Ali Mardan is first mentioned after the death of the Afsharid ruler Nader Shah in 1747, as one of the supporters of the latter's nephew Ali Qoli Khan, who was crowned as Adil Shah ("righteous king") in Mashhad. The new ruler, however, "lacked his uncle's imperious magnetism to pull together the surviving elements of a sprawling and exhausted empire." Rather than marching to the old Safavid capital of Isfahan to ensure the safeguard of the city, he sent his brother Ebrahim Mirza to the city instead, and stayed at Mashhad and held festives. This, however, reduced in the dissatisfaction of his underemployed army, while the city was weakened to near-poverty. In late 1747, Ali Mardan asked for Adil Shahs allowance to allow him to lead his Bakhtiari men home, which the latter declined. Nonetheless, Ali Mardan and his men ignored his order and left the city—they were hunted by a force sent by Adil Shah, which they inflicted an overwhelming defeat on.

Ali Mardan and his men eventually reached the Zagros ranges of western Iran, while Ebrahim Mirza was gathering supporters in Isfahan to claim the throne from his brother. Other Bakhtiaris had already heavy influence and authority, under the Haft Lang chieftain Abu'l-Fath Khan Bakhtiari, who was the governor of the city. In the summer of 1748, Ebrahim Mirza defeated and blinded Adil Shah, and ascended the throne as the new Afsharid king. He was, however, shortly defeated and killed by the forces of Nader Shah's grandson Shahrokh Shah, who remained in Mashhad, and did not make any effort to restore Afsharid rule in western Iran, which was in turmoil. Meanwhile, Ali Mardan and his men clashed with the forces of Zakariya Khan and the Zand chieftain Karim Khan. Initially defeated, Ali Mardan managed to emerge victorious and seize Golpayegan, a key spot on the route to Isfahan. In the spring of 1750, he attempted to capture Isfahan, but was defeated at Murchakhur, a town near the city. He then started to dispatch messengers at Golpayegan to his regional opponents, which included Karim Khan and Zakariya Khan, who accepted his offer of terms, and combined their forces with the latter, which made the number of their men strength to 20,000.

=== De facto rule in Isfahan and its surroundings ===
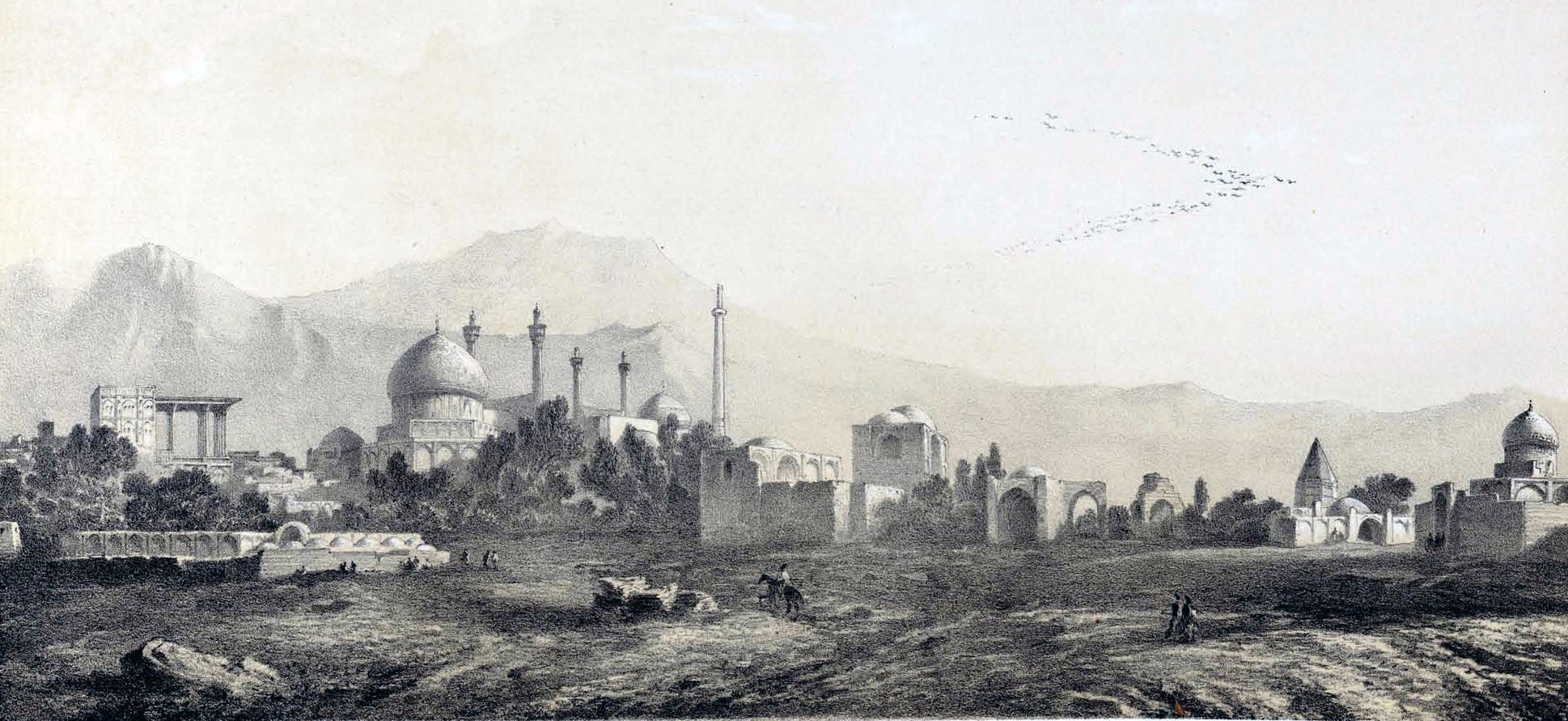
An illustration of Isfahan from the south.

In May 1750, they stormed the gates of Isfahan—its governor Abu'l-Fath and other prominent residents assembled to protect the fortress of the city, but agreed to surrender and collaborate with them after Ali Mardan's reasonable proposals. Abu'l-Fath, together with Ali Mardan and Karim Khan, formed an alliance in western Iran under the cover of restoring the Safavid dynasty, appointing a 17 year old Safavid prince, Abu Torab, as a puppet ruler—on June 29, Abu Torab was declared shah, and assumed the dynastic name of Ismail III.

Ali Mardan then took the title of Vakil-e daulat ("deputy of the state") as the head of the administration, while Abu'l-Fath maintained his post as governor of Isfahan, and Karim Khan was appointed commander (sardar) of the army, and was given the task of conquering the rest of Iran. However, a few months later, while Karim Khan was on an expedition in Kurdistan, Ali Mardan began breaking the terms which they had promised the inhabitants of Isfahan—he greatly increased his shakedown on the city, which New Julfa suffered the most from. He then further broke the terms he had made with the two chieftains, by having Abu'l-Fath deposed and killed. He then appointed his uncle as the new governor of the city, and without conference, marched towards Shiraz and began pillaging the province of Fars. Furthermore, he also started having his deputies replaced, whilst extracting heavy tax and numerous riches to keep his army supplied with the equipment and goods they required. This resulted in various of his bureaucrats and officers to depart from him, while a great deal of them had one of their eyes removed. After having plundered Kazerun, Ali Mardan left for Isfahan, but was ambushed at the dangerous passage of Kutal-e Dokhtar by regional guerrillas under Muzari Ali Khishti, who was the chieftain of the neighbouring Khisht village. They managed to seize the plunder of Ali Mardan and kill 300 of his men, which forced the latter to withdraw to a more difficult passage to reach Isfahan. By winter, the forces of Ali Mardan had decreased even more due to abandonment from some of his men.

=== War with Karim Khan Zand over supremacy in western Iran ===
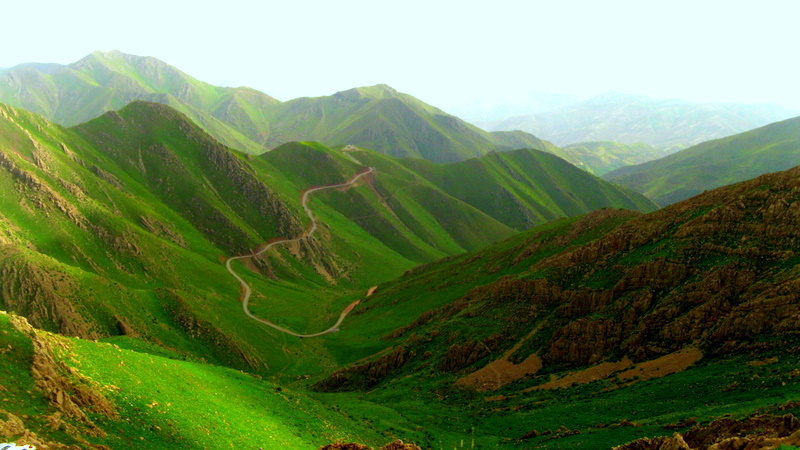
Landscape of western Iran.

The situation worsened further for Ali Mardan, when Karim Khan returned to Isfahan in January 1751 and restored order in the city. A battle shortly occurred between them in Lorestan—during the battle, Ismail III and Zakariya Khan (who was now his vizier), together with several prominent officers, deserted Ali Mardan and joined Karim Khan, who eventually emerged victorious, forcing Ali Mardan and the remains of his men, together with the governor of Lorestan, Ismail Khan Feyli, to retreat to Khuzestan. There Ali Mardan made an alliance with Shaykh Sa'd, the governor of Khuzestan, who reinforced him with soldiers. In the late spring of 1752, Ali Mardan, together with Ismail Khan Feyli, marched to Kermanshah. The forces of Karim Khan shortly attacked their encampment, but were repelled. Ali Mardan then went further into domains of the Zands, which resulted in a battle with Karim Khan near Nahavand. Ali Mardan, however, was once again defeated, and forced to withdraw into the mountains, where he went to the Ottoman city of Baghdad.

There he became acquainted with Mostafa Khan Bigdili Shamlu, the former diplomat of Nader Shah, who had been in 1746 sent to Baghdad to confirm the Treaty of Kerden with the Ottomans. A son of the former Safavid shah Tahmasp II (r. 1729–1732), who had managed to escape Isfahan during the massacre of the members of the Safavid family by Mahmud Hotak in 1725, was also in the city. This provided a key opportunity for Ali Mardan, Ismail Khan Feyli and Mostafa Khan to use the prince to return to Iran in the pretext of attempting to restore the Safavid dynasty. A year later, in early 1753, they began assembling an army in Lorestan, and received the support of the Pashtun military leader Azad Khan Afghan. Some months later, they marched into the domains of Karim Khan, but Tahmasp II's son, who had been announced as Sultan Husayn II, began revealing himself as an unfit candidate as Safavid shah—this hindered their march, and resulted in the desertion of many of their men. Furthermore, after doing a thorough check of Sultan Husayn II's background, Ali Mardan and his associates exposed his true identity, and found out that he was in reality not of Safavid descent, but the son of an Azeri man and an Armenian woman.

Ali Mardan's men in Kermanshah, after two years of besiegement by the Zand forces, surrendered and were spared by Karim Khan, who shortly clashed with Ali Mardan once again, defeating the latter and capturing Mostafa Khan. Ali Mardan managed to flee with Sultan Husayn II, but not after long had him blinded and sent to Iraq, due to being more heavy weight than of use to him.

In the spring of 1754, Ali Mardan captured two of Karim Khan's relatives, Mohammad Khan Zand and Shaykh Ali Khan Zand. He then took them into his encampment near Kermanshah, and began negotiating with them about the possibility of an alliance, which, however, was fruitless. The two Zand chiefs, at a coordinated signal, attacked Ali Mardan and killed him with his own dagger, and then fled from the camp on horseback, under fire from Ali Mardan's men.

== See also ==
- Zand conquest of Luristan

== Sources ==
- Perry, John R. (2011). "Karim Khan Zand". KARIM KHAN ZAND – Encyclopaedia Iranica. Encyclopaedia Iranica, Vol. XV, Fasc. 6. pp. 561–564.
- Perry, John (1991). "The Zand dynasty". The Cambridge History of Iran, Vol. 7: From Nadir Shah to the Islamic Republic. Cambridge: Cambridge University Press. pp. 1–63. ISBN 9780521200950.
- Perry, John R. (1983). "Abu'l-Fath Khan Bakhtiari". Archived copy. Encyclopaedia Iranica, Vol. I, Fasc. 3. p. 285. Archived from the original on 2013-05-16.
- Garthwaite, Gene R. (2005). The Persians. Wiley. pp. 1–311. ISBN 9781557868602.
- Perry, J. (1971). "The Last Ṣafavids, 1722-1773". Journal of Near Eastern Studies. 9 (2): 59–69. doi:10.2307/4300438. JSTOR 4300438.

Preceded by Abu'l-Fath Khan Bakhtiari	Ruler of Isfahan; 1750–1751	Succeeded by Karim Khan Zand
