= Haft Lang =

Regions with significant populations
- Chaharmahal and Bakhtiari Province, Khuzestan Province, Lorestan Province, parts of Isfahan Province

Languages
- Bakhtiari dialect

Religion
- Shia Islam

Related ethnic groups
- Chahar Lang

Haft Lang is one of the main tribes of the Bakhtiari people, an Iranian Lur-speaking ethnic group primarily residing in southwestern Iran. Its origins date back to the 13th century, during the early period of the Mongol Ilkhanate, in the Zagros Mountains, where it formed under the pressure of Mongol commanders as a defensive strategy against the increasing fiscal demands imposed by the Mongols in Iran.

== History ==
The Haft Lang tribe has a long and documented history, dating back several centuries. Traditionally, the Haft Lang and Chahar Lang (Four Legs) were the two major divisions of the Bakhtiari tribal confederation. These divisions were historically significant in the politics, economy, and military organization of the Bakhtiari people.

During the Safavid and Qajar eras, the Haft Lang played an important role in regional politics, often serving as tribal allies or opponents of ruling dynasties. The tribe is known for its contributions to major historical events in southwestern Iran, including uprisings, inter-tribal conflicts, and the Constitutional Revolution in the early 20th century.

== Geography ==
Haft Lang tribes primarily inhabit the provinces of Chaharmahal and Bakhtiari, Lorestan, Khuzestan, and parts of Isfahan. The tribe traditionally practiced nomadism, moving seasonally between summer highlands (yaylāq) and winter lowlands (qishlāq) to graze their livestock. Today, many members are settled in towns and cities while retaining their cultural heritage.

== Clans ==
The Haft Lang is composed of several clans, including:

- Duraki
- Babadiwand
- Bahmaniwand
- Armandiwand
- Shehniwand
- Jalaliwand
- Qaleh Bardariwand

These clans historically functioned autonomously under their respective leaders, but they cooperated under the Haft Lang tribal confederation during larger socio-political or military events.

== Culture and Society ==
Haft Lang society is traditionally tribal and organized along kinship lines. The tribe is well known for its rich oral traditions, including epic storytelling, poetry, and folk music. The Bakhtiari dialect spoken by Haft Lang members has distinct phonetic and lexical features compared to other Lur dialects.

Marriage, leadership, and social ceremonies are often conducted according to longstanding customs. Traditional Haft Lang music and dances, often performed at weddings and seasonal festivals, remain an integral part of their cultural identity.

== Language ==
Members of the Haft Lang tribe primarily speak the Bakhtiari dialect of the Luri language, with variations across different clans. Some bilingualism with Persian is common, particularly among settled populations.

== Economy ==
Historically, Haft Lang tribes were pastoralists, herding sheep, goats, and cattle. Seasonal migration supported both subsistence agriculture and livestock trade. Modern Haft Lang communities have diversified into agriculture, trade, and urban professions while maintaining traditional practices in rural areas.

== See also ==
- Bakhtiari people
- Chahar Lang
- Luri language
