= Bakhtiari people =

Iranian tribe

Bakhtiari
بختیاری

Total population
- 1 million (2001); 1to 1.5 million (2020)

Regions with significant populations
- Khuzestan, Chaharmahal and Bakhtiari, Isfahan, Markazi, Lorestan and Bushehr

Languages
- Bakhtiari dialect

Religion
- Predominantly Shia Islam

Related ethnic groups
- Other Lurs

The Bakhtiari (Persian: بختیاری, romanized: Bakhtyārī; also spelled Bakhtiyari) are a Lur tribe from the western half of Iran. They speak the Bakhtiari dialect, a sub-branch of the Luri language closely related to Classical Persian.

Bakhtiaris primarily inhabit Chaharmahal and Bakhtiari and eastern Khuzestan, Lorestan, Bushehr, and Isfahan provinces. Bakhtiari tribes have an especially large population concentration in the cities of Masjed Soleyman, Izeh, Shahr-e Kord, and Andika, and the surrounding villages.

A small percentage of Bakhtiari are still nomadic pastoralists, migrating between summer quarters (sardsīr or yaylāq) and winter quarters (garmsīr or qishlāq). According to Jean-Pierre Digard, "the Bakhtiari tribe offers the most typical, most complete example of Iranian nomadism."

== Origins ==
Although there have been several suggested theories for the origin of the Bakhtiyaris, historians and researchers generally agree that they are Lurs. Unlike other Lurs, Bakhtiaris primarily identify as Bakhtiari. According to folklore, the Lurs are descended from a group of youngsters who survived and fled from the demon Zahhak, a demonic figure who is mentioned in Zoroastrian mythology, as well as the Shahnameh. They took shelter in Zardkuh and Kuhrang, where they named themselves Lur ("nomadic"). Due to their luck of escaping danger throughout their history, they called themselves bakhtiyar ("fortunate"). In scholarship, it has been suggested Bakhtiyaris are descended from the Uxian tribe, who clashed with the Macedonian king Alexander the Great (r. 336–323 BC) in Khuzestan 330 BC.

A second theory suggests that the Bakhtiyaris were originally from Fars, but were settled to the north of Isfahan and Khuzestan after the legendary king Kay Khosrow conquered Media. A third theory suggests that the Bakhtiyaris were descended from the Mardi, a nomadic warrior tribe that lived around the Caspian coast of northern Iran. Due to the close resemblance to the names Bakhtiyari and Bakhtari (Bactrian), some historians have suggested that the Bakhtiyaris are descended from the Greeks who ruled over Bactria. The resemblance between Bakhtiyari and Greek dance has been used as further proof. Other historians consider the Bakhtiyaris to have resided in their area for a long time, and that they named themselves after the ancient Persian word Bakhtar ("the West") due to their geographical position.

Another theory supported by some historians is that the Bakhtiyaris are descended from Izz al-Dawla Bakhtiyar (r. 967–978), the Buyid ruler of Iraq. The name of the latter is first attestation of the word Bakhtiyar. The Bakhtiyaris themselves consider their name to be derived from the word Bakhtiyarwand, the name of the offspring of Bakhtiyar, a distinguished figure of Lur-i Buzurg (Greater Lur).

== Etymology ==
The term bakhtiari can be best translated as "companion of fortune" or "bearer of good luck" The term has deep Persian roots, and is the result of two smaller words bakht and yar complied together. Bakht is the Persian word for "fortune" and yar, iar, iari literally means "companion".

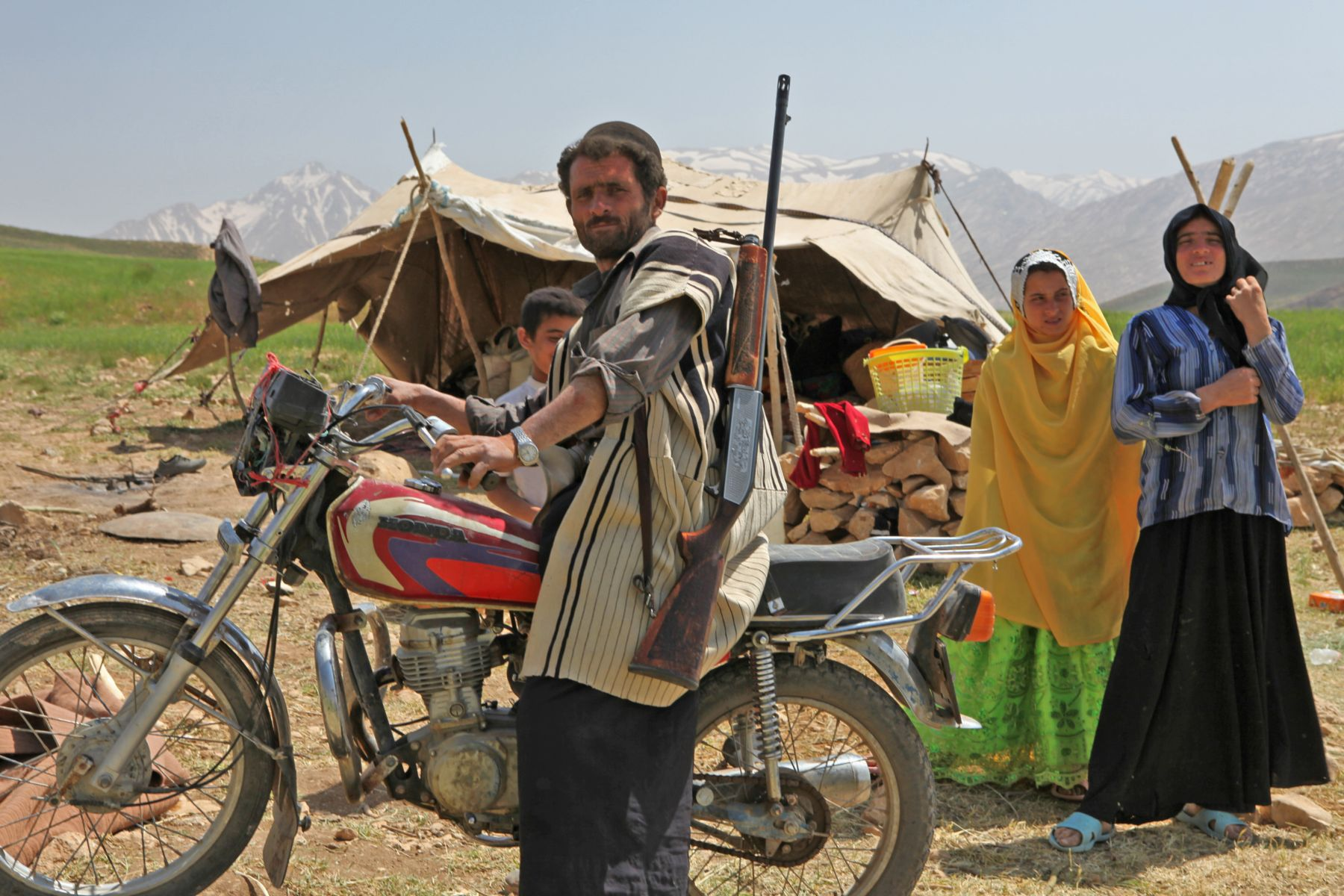
A Bakhtiari nomadic family, August 2014

The latter designation largely relates to the nature of the tribe's annual "migration". This has to do with the harsh nature of Bakhtiari life, and overcoming of countless difficulties that Bakhtiaris have faced in the Zagros ranges. In this sense, Bakhtiaris view themselves as a hardworking tribe, facing numerous obstacles every day, and yet fortunate enough to overcome each of these challenges as a solid unit.

Nevertheless, the origins of Bakhtiaris are ancient, and it may have very well been the case that the tribe underwent a series of name changes throughout its history. However it is mostly claimed that the designation "Bakhtiari" came largely into use some time in antiquity.

In The Ascent of Man, Jacob Bronowski states that "The Bakhtiari take their name from a legendary herdsman of Mongol times, Bakhtyar," who according to a Bakhtiari origin myth is "the father of [their] people". Bronowski points out similarities between Bakhtyar and the Israelite Jacob, who was also the ancestral patriarch of his nomadic people and a herdsman who had two wives.

== History ==
In c. 913, Lorestan split into two realms: Lur-i Buzurg (Greater Lur); Lur-i Kuchak (Lesser Lur). The Bakhtiyaris are first attested in history in the early 15th-century. In 1413, the arrival of several Bakhtiyari clans such as the Astarki, Kutwand, Raki, Janaki and Zallaki are mentioned by the Timurid-era historian Mu'in al-Din Natanzi. Under the Safavids, Lur-i Kuchak became known as Luristan-i Fili, while Lur-i Buzurg (extending from Isfahan to Kohgiluyeh and from Shushtar to Behbahan) became Bakhtiyari land. In 1566, Shah Tahmasp I (r. 1524–1576) selected the Astarki chieftain Tajmir as ilkhan of the Bakhtiyari. He was, however, later killed and succeeded by Jahangir Khan Bakhtiyari, who is responsible for splitting the Bakhtiyaris into two groups, the Haft Lang and Chahar Lang. By the time of the reign of Shah Abbas I (r. 1588–1629), the northern part of Lur-i Buzurg became known as Bakhtiyari.

After the Safavids, the Bakhtiari tribes under Qasim Khan and Safi Khan resisted both the Afghan invasion and the Ottoman invasion, but generally did not agree well with Ali Mardan Khan Feyli, the Vali of Luristan. The Afghans did not penetrate Bakhtiari territory, and their attempted invasion of Kuhgilu resulted in a humiliating failure. When Nader Shah came to power, he appointed Ali Mardan Khan to diplomatic positions in Istanbul and replaced him with Baba Khan Chavushlu as governor of Luristan. Nader Shah sent several expeditions against a new Bakhtiari leader Ali Murad Mamivand Chahar-Lang, eventually executing him and deporting Bakhtiaris to Khorasan. In Khorasan, they distinguished themselves in the assault on Kandahar and returned to their lands after the death of Nader Shah.

After the death of Nader Shah, Ali Mardan Khan, a Bakhtiari leader not to be confused with the Vali of Luristan, attempted to take advantage of the power vacuum. In 1750, Ali Mardan Khan and Karim Khan Zand both set up Ismail III at Isfahan, although in 1752, Ali Mardan Khan was defeated and fled to Baghdad where he was assassinated. In 1785, when Jafar Khan Zand had to fall back on Shiraz, groups of Lurs and Turks assembled at Isfahan under former partisans of Ali Murad Khan, although the town was soon occupied by Agha Mohammad Khan Qajar who attacked the Bakhtiaris. Ali Mardan Khan, the Bakhtiari leader, had initially allied with Karim Khan Zand before the alliance deteriorated and he was eventually killed. The Bakhtiaris had not forgotten their prestigious status under the Safavids and Afshars, with Ali Mardan Khan almost becoming ruler of Iran, before losing it to the Zands. They remained restless throughout the Zand period. Karim Khan took stricter measures against the Bakhtiaris after retaking Isfahan in 1764, disarming the Bakhtiaris and resettling the Haft-Lang in the Qom and Varamin regions, and the Chahar-Lang in the Fasa region. Bakhtiari warriors were also conscripted by the Zand army.

Bakhtiari tribal and political structure was considered independent from that of the other Lurs since at least the 1800s. The national prominence of Bakhtiari leaders in the 19th and 20th centuries led to the Bakhtiaris becoming widely known, causing their Lur affiliations to be overlooked by some scholars. The Bakhtiaris were never fully brought under control during the reign of the Qajar dynasty. Initially, the Kunurzi family, descended from a brother of Ali Mardan Khan was leading the Bakhtiaris, although the expedition of Manuchehr Khan Gorji of Isfahan in 1841 had ended the career of the Ilkhani Mohammadtaqi Khan Chahar-Lang, and his family did not recover. In 1846, the Bakhtiarvand or Baydarvand family rose to prominence among the Haft-Lang. At the time, there was a conflict among the Bakhtiari for leadership, with the Ilkhani and Hajji Ilkhani on one side, and the Ilbegi on the other. They eventually established a principle of power-sharing which lasted until 1936 when Reza Shah placed the Bakhtiari territory under direct administration.

Before 1936, the Bakhtiari tribes were virtually autonomous, and were ruled by the Ilbegi and Ilkhani. The Ilkhani and Hajji Ilkhani group were significantly rich, partially because of investments after 1899 from "Messrs. Lynch Bros" after the Bakhtiari road was opened, connecting Ahvaz, Shushtar, and Isfahan, as well as oil concessions after 1905 while the Ilbegi and Ilkhani both received British subsidies in World War I in exchange for Bakhtiari support. The Bakhtiari played a considerable role in the Persian Constitutional Revolution, in alliance with Shia scholars and urban constitutionalist reformers, and achieved local and national prominence. By 1912, seven cities, including Kerman, Isfahan, and Kashan, were governed by Bakhtiari leaders, while Sardar Assad was Minister of War and Samsam ol-Saltaneh was Prime Minister. The Bakhtiaris were near the peak of their historic strength when Reza Shah came to power.

Reza Shah viewed the organization, power, and way of life of the Bakhtiari as incompatible with national modernization on Western lines, and in 1936 he pursued a threefold policy of forcible sedentarization by posting troops to prevent access to migration routes, detribalization by deposing tribe leaders and replacing them with army officers to handle tribal affairs and territorial administration, and deculturation by various means such as the prohibition of beards and obligation to wear Western-style suits and the Pahlavi hat instead of the traditional Bakhtiari costume to which they were deeply attached. Reza Shah had largely been unsuccessful as World War II disrupted the Iranian state apparatus. During those ten years, Bakhtiari losses of livestock were estimated at 60 percent, and the few foreign travelers who visited the Bakhtiaris at that time only spoke of their distress and impoverishment.

Under Mohammad Reza Shah, there were no major decisions on nomadism until about 1960. After World War II and in the 1950s, the tribes of Iran, including the Bakhtiaris, were still relatively powerful and active in politics, as they showed during the premiership of Mohammad Mosaddegh. Unable to ignore them, the successive cabinets shifted between cooperation and repression. Among the cooperative measures were the restitution of properties to tribe leaders in 1945, the Koenig mission in 1947-48, the tribal conference of September 1948, and the establishment of a civilian High Council of the Tribes in 1953. For the Bakhtiari, the Shah marrying Soraya Esfandiary-Bakhtiary in February, 1951, was a sign of favor. In 1957, the Bakhtiari tribe leaders were compensated for their losses due to oil nationalization. Among the repressive measures were the exiling of the family of the Qashqai leaders in 1954, the establishment of a branch of the General Staff and an officer corps trained to handle tribal affairs in 1956, the abolition of the title khan in the same year, and the decision to disarm all tribes in 1957, that all the tribes should be disarmed. Ultimately, the repressive attitude prevailed, with the Iranian government adopting a policy of officially ignoring the existence of tribes in the 1960s and confiscating their lands. They also passed laws severely restricting the freedom of tribes to function. By the mid-1970s, these measures caused many Bakhtiaris to lose motivation, and had also caused the Bakhtiari to lose a considerable amount of tribe members.

The Iranian revolution in 1979 did not kindle any real revolutionary fervor among the Bakhtiari, although the increased freedom prevailing in the following months, together with a strong demand for meat in local markets, prompted a resurgence of nomadic pastoralism, although it did not last long. The IRGC established tribal councils in every tribe, giving the tribesmen more control whereas the tribal superiors previously had more control. The tribal superiors were not removed, but were bo longer heeded. Soon, the Jihad of Construction arrived in all parts of the Bakhtiari territory, building roads, bridges, silos, schools, and houses, also bringing electricity and telephone lines to villages, and setting up networks of producer and consumer cooperatives. Bakhtiaris were also given incentives to settle.

== Territory ==
The traditional territory of the Bakhtiari tribes was also known as "Bakhtiari", or "Bakhtiaristan", the "boundaries of Bakhtiari" (hudud-e bakhtiari), and the "Bakhtiari country" (khak-e il-e bakhtiari), and it was an area of roughly 75,000 km2 stretching from the Dez river, Shushtar, and Ramhormoz on the west to Daran and the outskirts of Shahr-e Kord on the east. Also called the "Bakhtiari mountains" or "Bakhtiari-Zagros", it was surrounded by natural borders, which were the Sezar river (the northwestern tributary to the Dez river) forming the boundary against Luristan, as well as the Karun Vanak, Khersan, and Marun delineating the boundary between the Bakhtiari mountains and the Kuhgilu mountains. The watershed between the endorheic basins of central Iran, and the tributaries of the Persian Gulf, were considered as possibly the eastern margin, while the mountain front of the Zagros between the Dez and Marun rivers formed a natural boundary to the west. Within these natural boundaries, the Bakhtiari mountains were the central and highest part of the entire Zagros system. The region was comparable in size to Ireland, Georgia, or the Czech Republic. Ervand Abrahamian described the Bakhtiari region as geographically being "the very heart" of Iran. The Bakhtiari tribes were historically present further to the north of the natural border with Luristan around Fereydan and Borujerd.

== Tribes ==
The Bakhtiari were traditionally divided into the Haft-Lang and Chahar-Lang. The Haft-Lang consisted of the Duraki, Babadi, Bakhtiarvand (or Behdarvand), Dinarani, and Janaki (Javanaki). The Chahar-Lang consisted of the Mamivand, Mohammad-Saleh (or Mam-Saleh), Muguyi, Kayanarsi, and Zalaqi.

== Culture ==
=== Music ===
The Bakhtiari are noted in Iran for their music which inspired Russian composer Alexander Borodin.

=== Livelihood and dwellings ===
Bakhtiari nomads migrate twice a year with their herds for pasture: in spring to the mountains in their summer quarters (sardsīr or yaylāq), and in autumn to valleys and the plains in their winter quarters (garmsīr or qishlāq). The livestock the Bakhtiari mainly raise are goats, sheep, horses, and cattle. However, some Bakhtiari also engage in agricultural occupations, and mostly cultivate wheat and other cereal grains. Nomadic Baktiari rely on trading and bartering with nearby villages and populations to obtain products they don't have or are unable to create themselves (like agricultural goods). Temporary dwellings for the Bakhtiari include rectangular tents or brush or wood shelters. These types of dwellings are used when moving their herds around. Recently, some Bakhtiari have urbanized and began to settle in large villages and even in cities.

=== Language, gender, and religion ===
They traditionally speak the Bakhtiari dialect. Some of them also spoke Arabic or Turkic. Most Bakhtiaris are Twelver Shia Muslim. During the time of Constantine the Great, there was a story about Bakhtiaris converting to Christianity.

Like all Iranian ethnic groups Bakhtiari society is patriarchal and patrilineal, men were traditionally tasked with raising animals and tending herds. While Bakhtiari women were renowned for their basket weaving.

A young Bakhtiari man with his child, spring 2025

== Population ==
Some sources estimate the population of Bakhtiari lors in the whole country to be around 3 to 6 million people. Some other sources have estimated the population of Il Bakhtiari at 4 million people. In the Bakhtiarika book, the population of monolingual Bakhtiari is estimated at 2 million, and the population of bilingual Bakhtiari plus those who have forgotten their mother tongue is estimated at nearly 2 million (total of 4 million people).

== Genetics ==
According to research into NRY markers, the Bakhtiari, as with many other groups in Iran, show very elevated frequencies for Y-DNA haplogroup J2, a trait common for Eurasian populations, likely originating in Anatolia and the Caucasus The Southwest Eurasian haplogroups F, G, and T1a also reach substantial frequency among Bakhtiaris.

== Notable Bakhtiari people ==
- Ali Mardan Khan Bakhtiari (18th century) supreme chieftain
- Ali-Qoli Khan Bakhtiari (c. 1856–1917) Iranian revolutionary and a chieftain of the Bakhtiari Haft Lang tribe
- Bibi Maryam Bakhtiari (1874–1937) Iranian Lor Bakhtiari revolutionary and activist of the Iranian Constitutional Revolution. A military commander
- David Bakhtiari (born 1991) American former gridiron football player who played for the Green Bay Packers.
- Eric Bakhtiari (born 1984) American former gridiron football player who played for several NFL franchises.
- Hossein Gholi Khan Ilkhani (1821–1882) Iranian nobleman
- Khalil Esfandiary-Bakhtiary (1901–1983) Iranian politician and diplomat
- Laleh Bakhtiar (1938–2020) Iranian and American Islamic and Sufi scholar
- Najaf Qoli Khan Bakhtiari (1846–1930) Persian Prime Minister and a leader of the Iranian Constitutional Revolution
- Shapour Bakhtiar (1914–1991) Prime Minister of Iran
- Soraya Esfandiary-Bakhtiary (1932–2001) Queen of Iran as the second wife of Shah Mohammad Reza Pahlavi
- Masoud Bakhtiari (1940–2006) Iranian teacher, poet and singer
- Mohsen Rezaee (born 1954) Iranian politician
- Toomaj Salehi (born 1990) Iranian rapper
- Erfan Tahmasbi (born 1997) Iranian singer

== Gallery ==
"Dastmal Bazi" dance in a wedding celebration, March 2023

"Dastmal Bazi" dance in a wedding celebration, August 2019

A Charlang Bakhtiari nomadic family, February 2023

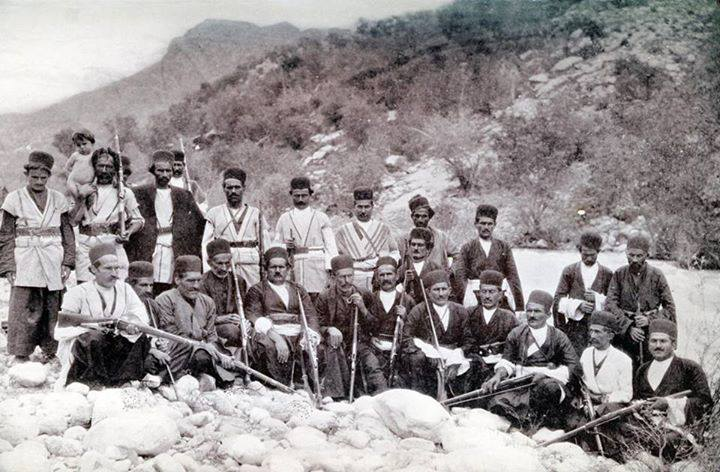
Military Men of the Baba-Ahmadi Tribe, January 1925

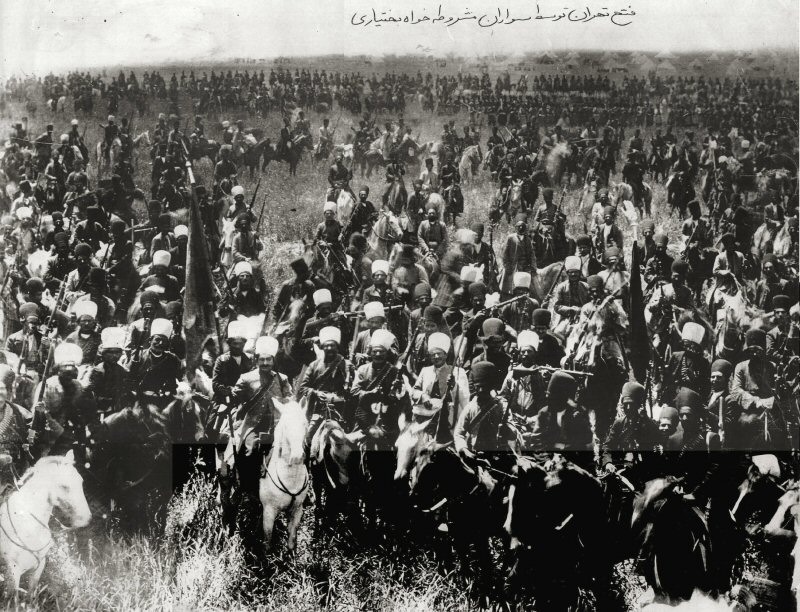
The Capture of Tehran by Bakhtiari Constitutionalists, June 1909

Lirah Village, Mugui Rural District, Chaharmahal and Bakhtiari Province, November 2020

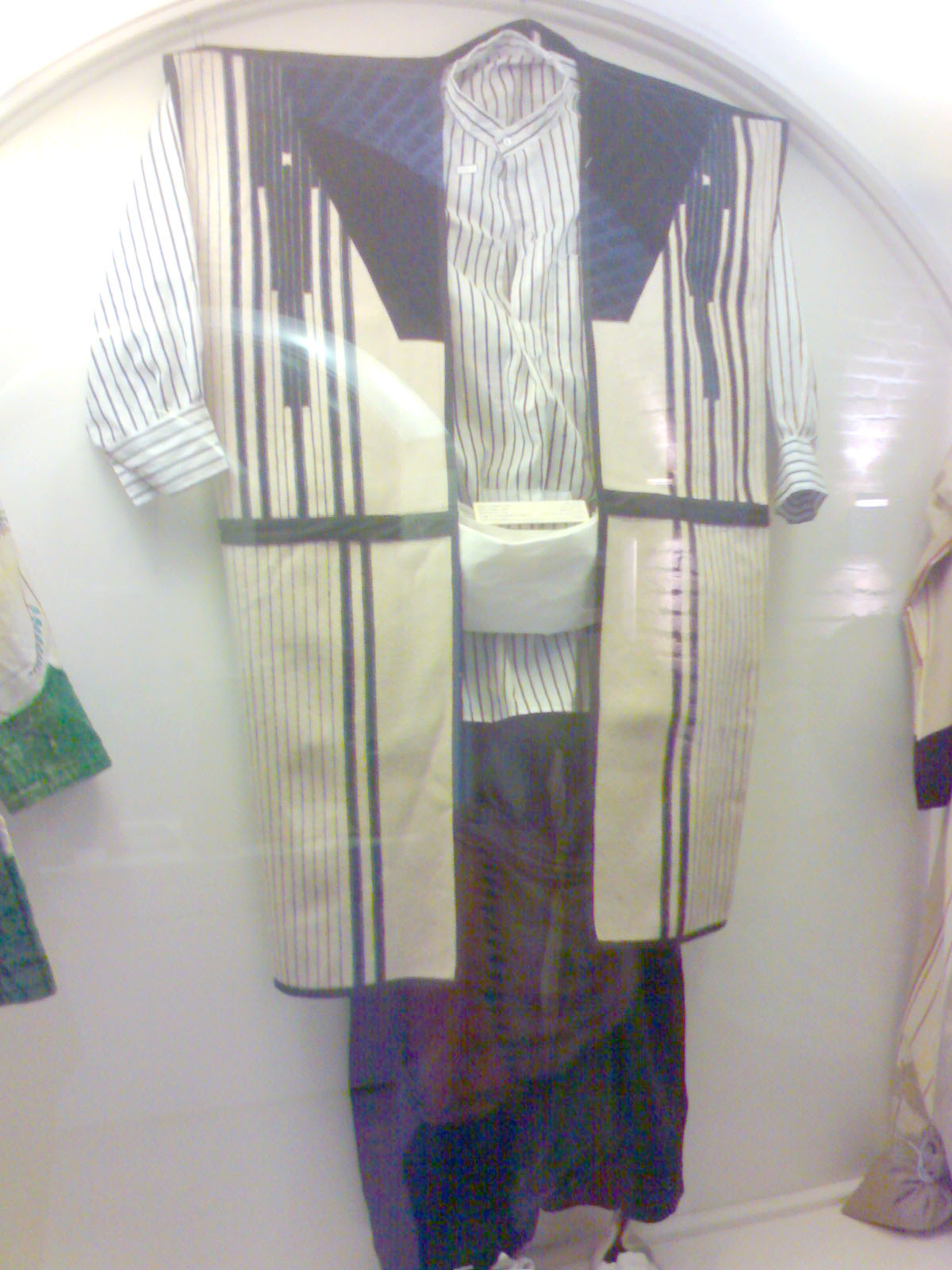
Chougha and Debit, Bakhtiari men's costume

The Prominent Presence of Bakhtiari Nomads in the Armed Forces Parade of Khuzestan Province in Ahvaz

== See also ==
- Demographics of Iran
- Ethnic minorities in Iran
- Siege of Kandahar
- Yaylag
- Chougha
- Debit
