= Charles Christie (East India Company officer) =

British expatriates in Iran

- Born: United Kingdom
- Died: 1812; Aslanduz
- Cause of death: Killed in action
- Burial place: Aslanduz
- Relatives: James Christie (father)
- Military career
- Allegiance: British Empire; Qajar Iran
- Branch: East India Company; Army
- Rank: Captain
- Units: Anglo-Indian army Nezam-e Jadid
- Commands: Shaqaqi Regiment of the Nezam-e Jadid
- Known for: Battle of Aslanduz and the 1810 expeditions through to Herat
- Conflicts: Russo-Persian War (1804–1813); Battle of Sultanabad; Battle of Aslanduz †

Charles Christie (died 1812) was a British officer, mostly remembered for his endeavours in Qajar Iran. A member of the first British military mission to Iran (1810), he was killed in action while serving on the Iranian side during the Russo-Persian War of 1804–1813.

== Biography ==
Charles Christie was the son of James Christie, the founder of Christie's Auction House. Originally a captain of the Bombay Regiment of the Anglo-Indian army, in 1810, Christie and Lieutenant Henry Pottinger were ordered by Sir John Malcolm to explore the route from Bombay to Baluchistan, Sistan and the Makran. These areas were thought to hold a possible overland route by which a European army could invade India. Christie and Pottinger disguised themselves as horse dealers, and travelled north from the Makran coast to Nushki, where the two separated in March 1810. Christie moved north through Sistan to Herat and thereafter across the central Iranian desert to Yazd and Isfahan. A manuscript of Christie's travel journal is appended to Pottinger's account of his expedition which provided the first reliable information about these territories.

At the request of Harford Jones (later named Harford Jones-Brydges), the British envoy to Iran, Christie and a number of other British officers entered into military service with Iran hence forming the core of the military mission provided for in accordance with the Preliminary Treaty of Friendship and Alliance that Jones had negotiated with Fath-Ali Shah Qajar (r. 1797–1834) on 17 June 1809.

Christie was tasked with training the Iranian infantry (sarbaz) and had become the commander of the Shaqaqi Regiment, one of the twelve new regiments (Nezam-e Jadid) in the province of Azerbaijan. Christie fought on the Iranian side against the Russians during the Russo-Persian War of 1804–1813. However, in 1812, Britain and Russia had reconciled, which meant that Britain was withdrawing its support from Iran. Christie, two other British officers (Henry Lindsay and William Monteith) and thirteen sergeants were allowed to remain in Iranian service at the request of Crown Prince Abbas Mirza, commander of the Iranian army. Christie and Lindsay both participated in the Battle of Sultanabad (13 February 1812) which ended in an Iranian victory. During the battle, Christie and Lindsay reportedly threw themselves into the thick of the fighting, thereby gaining the admiration of the Iranians and proving that they would not refrain from attacking fellow Christians.

Both later participated in the ensuing Battle of Aslanduz (31 October–1 November 1812) that resulted in an Iranian defeat. During the battle, Christie was shot in the neck, but, as he refused to surrender, was said to have killed six Russian soldiers before being killed himself. John Cormick, physician to Abbas Mirza, found Christie's remains and buried them near the spot where he had been killed.

== Sources ==
- Atkin, Muriel (1980). Russia and Iran, 1780–1828. University of Minnesota Press. ISBN 978-0816609246.
- Cronin, Stephanie (2011). "ARMY v. Qajar Period ii. Early Qajar military reform.". In Yarshater, Ehsan (ed.). Encyclopædia Iranica (Online ed.). Encyclopædia Iranica Foundation.
- Ekbal, Kamran (1991). "Christie, Charles". In Yarshater, Ehsan (ed.). Encyclopædia Iranica. Vol. V/5: Chinese-Iranian relations VIII–C̆ihrdād Nask. London and New York: Routledge & Kegan Paul. pp. 547–548. ISBN 978-0-939214-72-3.
- Michael, M. A. (2019). "Not exactly a connoisseur: A new portrait of James Christie by Benjamin Vandergucht (1752–1794) and the auctioneer's family history". The British Art Journal. 19 (1).
