= Sadeq Khan Qajar =

Iranian military officer

- صادق خان ازل‌الدین قاجار
- Occupation: military commander
- Known for: Battle of Karabakh

Sadeq Khan Azal-dinlu Qajar (Persian: صادق خان ازل‌الدین قاجار) was a military commander of Abbas Mirza, the Qajar crown prince of Iran. Under the rank of sarhang (colonel), he took part in the Battle of Karabakh in the spring and summer of 1805. He led the cavalry during the Battle of Shusha in 1805, where he suffered injuries. He was later appointed as commander of the Nezam-e Jadid ("The New Army"), a project to build an up-to-date army capable of fighting in a modern environment. He was killed in 1813 during the Siege of Lankaran.

== Sources ==
- Amanat, Abbas (2017). Iran: A Modern History. Yale University Press. ISBN 978-0300112542.
- Behrooz, Maziar (2023). Iran at War: Interactions with the Modern World and the Struggle with Imperial Russia. I.B. Tauris. ISBN 978-0755637379.
- Bournoutian, George (2021). From the Kur to the Aras: A Military History of Russia's Move into the South Caucasus and the First Russo-Iranian War, 1801–1813. Brill. ISBN 978-9004445154.
