= Caucasus Colonization Scheme of 1823 =

19th century Europeans settling in Iran

The Caucasus Colonization Scheme was a 19th-century strategic initiative launched by the Persian Crown Prince Abbas Mirza. The plan sought to settle European immigrants, specifically British and German subjects, in the Caucasian provinces of Qajar Iran. By offering land grants, tax exemptions, and Christian governance, Abbas Mirza aimed to create European settlements to fortify Qajar Iran’s northern frontier against the Russian Empire.

The scheme was formally announced through a public manifesto published in The Times on July 11, 1823. Bypassing traditional diplomatic channels, Abbas Mirza addressed the European public directly to present Iran as a land of opportunity. The letter was designed to appeal to the post-Napoleonic European middle class, offering them a "New World" style of settlement in the East. Through this publication, the Crown Prince aimed to link the personal interests of European settlers to the territorial integrity of the Persian frontier, effectively forcing European powers to take a greater interest in checking Russian expansion.
