= Battle of Sultanabad =

Part of the Russo-Persian War (1812)

- Part of the Russo-Persian War (1804–1813)
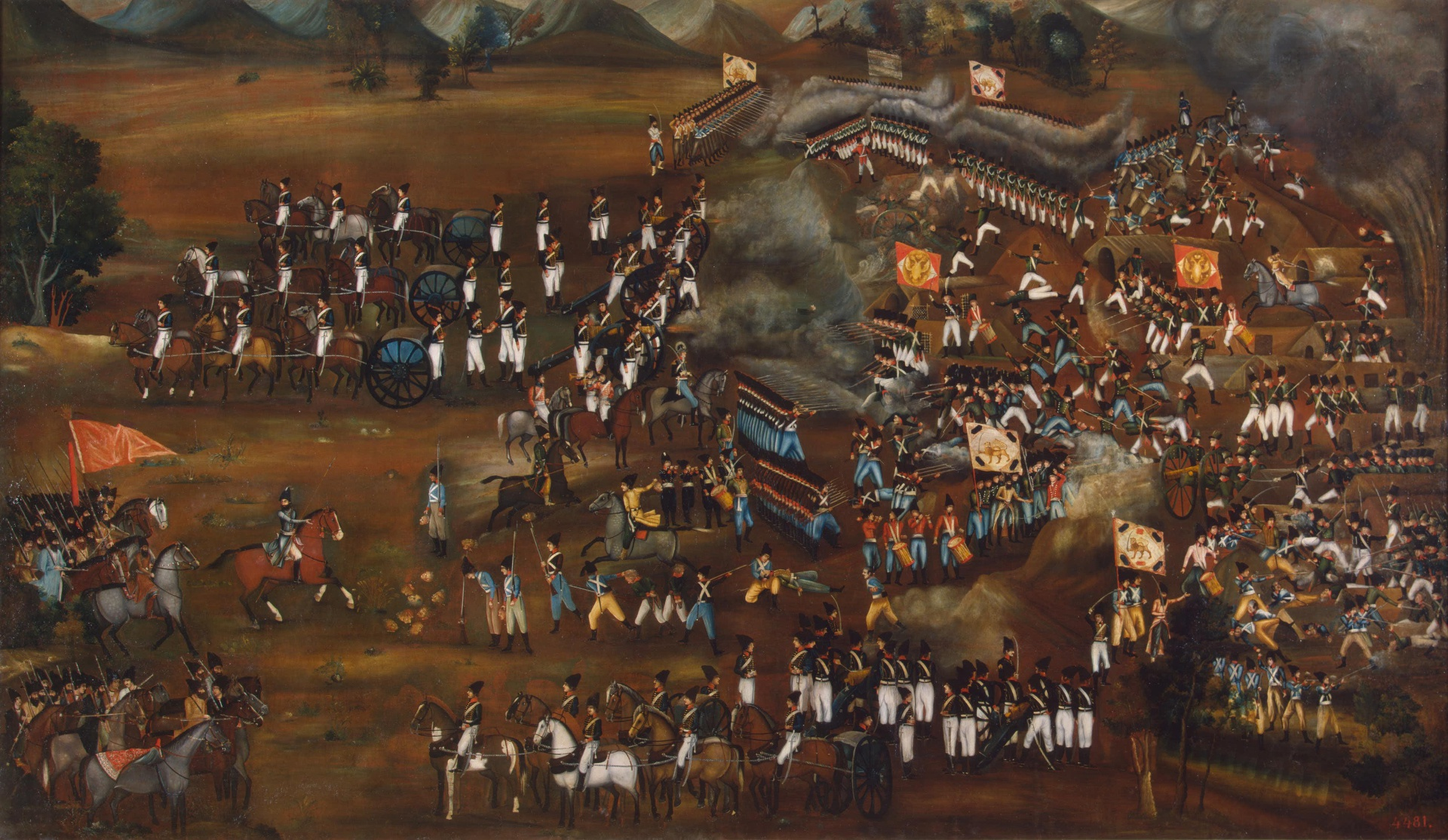
- This painting once decorated Abbas Mirza's palace. Depicted on this huge canvas is the defeat of the Russian Trinity Infantry Regiment in the battle near Sultanabad, which took place on 13 February 1812. Persian soldiers wearing European uniforms bear Persian banners, on which a lion holds a sabre in its paw against a background of the rising sun.
Date	13 February 1812
Location	Sultanabad, Aras River, Qajar Persia (nowadays Azerbaijan)
Result	Persian victory

Belligerents
(Russia) Russian Empire	Qajar Iran

Commanders and leaders
(Russian Empire) Col. Oleshnikov (POW)	Abbas Mirza

Strength
560 – 900	2,300 – 14,000

Casualties and losses
343 killed, 500 captured	140 killed – 300 killed (including 2 British sergeants)

The Battle of Sultanabad (Persian: نبرد سلطان‌آباد) occurred on 13 February 1812, between the Russian Empire and the Persian Empire. In the resulting battle, the Russians were surrounded and routed.

The Persians, numerically superior, were led by Crown Prince Abbas Mirza. A Persian offensive into Georgia, with Persia's British and French-trained Nezam-e Jadid infantry, initiated the battle. The Persians had also obtained European cannons from the French.

The Persians won the battle by moving faster than the Russians and by attacking them near their camp with the reformed European-style infantry. However, the Battle of Aslanduz and the Siege of Lankaran followed soon after, shifting the momentum of the war firmly in Russia's favor.

The battle is considered the most shameful page of the war for the Russians.

== See also ==
- Battle of Aslanduz
- Siege of Lankaran

== Bibliography ==
- Krugov, Alexei I.; Nechitailov, Maxim V. (2016). Персидская армия в войнах с Россией. 1796-1828 гг. [Persian army in wars with Russia, 1796-1828]. Ratnoe delo (in Russian). Moscow: Russkie vityazy. ISBN 978-5-9907714-9-9.
- Roxane Farmanfarmiaian (editor). (2008) War and Peace in Qajar Persia: Implications Past and Present. Routledge. ISBN 978-0-415-42119-5
- Journal of the British Institute of Persian Studies, Volume 36, Tehran Author, Article Title, page numbers needed
- Atkin, Muriel. (1980). Russia and Iran, 1780 - 1828. Minneapolis: University of Minnesota Press. ISBN 978-0-8166-5697-4
- Kazemzadeh, Firuz. (1974). Russian Penetration of the Caucasus. In Russian Imperialism: From Ivan the Great to the Revolution, ed. Taras Hunczak. New Brunswick, NJ: Rutgers University Press. ISBN 0-8135-0737-5
- Bournoutian, George (2021). From the Kur to the Aras. A Military History of Russia’s Move into the South Caucasus and the First Russo-Iranian War, 1801—1813. Iranian Studies, Volume 22. Brill. ISBN 978-90-04-44515-4.
- Егоршина, Петрова (2023). История русской армии [The history of the Russian Army] (in Russian). Moscow: Edition of the Russian Imperial Library. ISBN 978-5-699-42397-2.
