= Ahmad Mirza Moein od-Dowleh =

Qajar prince and governor (1818/19–1892/93)

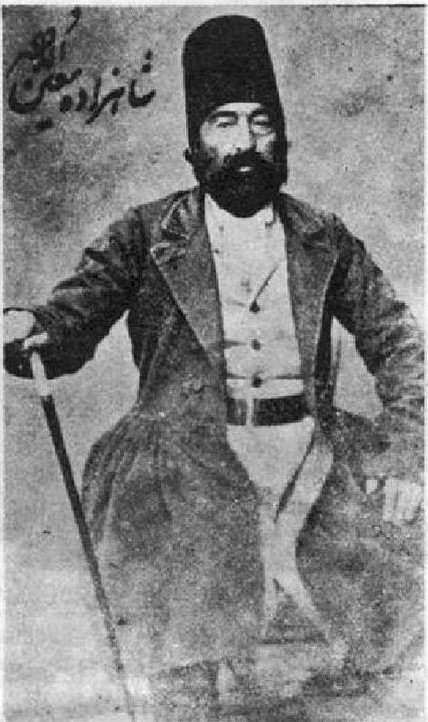
- Photograph of Ahmad Mirza Moein od-Dowleh
- Born: 1818/19
- Died: 1892/93
- Burial: Imam Reza shrine, Mashhad
- Dynasty: Qajar
- Father: Abbas Mirza
- Religion: Twelver Shia Islam

Ahmad Mirza Moein od-Dowleh (Persian: احمد میرزا معین‌الدوله; 1818/19–1892/93) was a Qajar prince and governor in Iran, and the tenth son of Crown Prince Abbas Mirza. Like his father, he was buried in the Dar al-Huffaz section of the Imam Reza Shrine in Mashhad.

== Sources ==
- Bamdad, Mehdi (1968). شرح حال رجال ایران در قرن ۱۲ و ۱۳ و ۱۴ هجری [Dictionary of National Biography of Iran, 1700-1960, vol. 1].
