= Pyotr Kotlyarevsky =

Russian general (1782-1852)

Pyotr Stepanovich Kotlyarevsky Пётр Степанович Котляревский
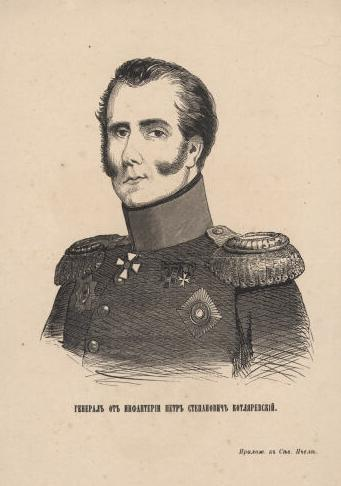
- Nickname: Suvorov of the Caucasus
- Born: 23 June 1782; Vilkhuvatka, Kharkov Governorate, Russian Empire
- Died: 2 November 1852 (aged 70) Feodosia, Taurida Governorate, Russian Empire
- Buried: Feodosia
- Allegiance: Russian Empire
- Branch: Imperial Russian Army
- Service years: 1793 - 1813
- Rank: General of the Infantry
- Commands: 17th Jaeger Regiment; Caucasus Infantry Regiment
- Conflicts: Persian Expedition of 1796; Battle of Niakhura; Russo-Persian War; Karyagin's Raid (WIA); Battle of Aslanduz; Storming of Lankaran (WIA)

Pyotr Stepanovich Kotlyarevsky (23 June 1782 – 2 November 1852) was a Russian military officer of Ukrainian origin. He was known for his service in the Russo-Persian War (1804–1813), where he won many battles against Iran.

== Biography ==
Pyotr Kotlyarevsky was born in 1782 in the village of Vilkhuvatka, near the city of Kupiansk. The Kotlyarevskys were a Ukrainian family who had emigrated east to the Sloboda region of the Russian Empire. Kotlyarevsky's father was a priest, and his family had originally intended for him to join the Orthodox clergy. However, his family later decided to send him to join the Imperial Russian Army after being convinced to do so by Russian military officer Ivan Lazarev.

Kotlyarevsky was brought to Mozdok in 1793, where he was enlisted in the Kuban Jaeger Corps. He first saw combat at the Siege of Derbent, during the Persian Expedition of 1796. He was promoted to Second Lieutenant in 1799. He then fought against the Avars at the Battle of Niakhura in 1800, and afterwards he was promoted to Captain.

Kotlyarevsky then fought in the Russo-Persian War (1804–13), where he would become famous for his military service. As a company commander, he participated in Karyagin's Raid in 1805, where he was wounded twice. He was then promoted to Colonel in 1807. In June 1810, Kotlyarevsky led a Russian detachment that defeated the Iranians at the fortified town of Meghri. Afterwards he was appointed as the commander of the Caucasus Infantry Regiment, and was also awarded the Gold Sword for Bravery. In 1811, Kotlyarevsky led a force of Russian soldiers and Cossacks which took the town of Akhalkalaki in order to prevent an Iranian offensive in the area.

By 1812, Kotlyarevsky had been promoted to General. During this time, the majority of the Russian Army was sent to fight against the French invasion, so the Russian soldiers facing Iran had a shortage of manpower. A large Iranian army led by Crown Prince Abbas Mirza was forming south of the Aras River, and it was preparing for an offensive to expel the Russians from the Caucasus. General Kotlyarevsky planned to defeat the Iranians with a surprise attack, and he led about 2,000 Russian soldiers south across the Aras River in October 1812. Despite being heavily outnumbered, Kotlyarevsky's soldiers defeated the 30,000 strong Iranian army led by Abbas Mirza at the Battle of Aslanduz. The Russians had destroyed Abbas Mirza's army, and this ended any chance of Iran winning the war. Kotlyarevsky then decided to consolidate Russia's victory by taking the Iranian fortress at Lankaran in January 1813. The fortress was too durable to be defeated with artillery, and the Iranian garrison refused to surrender, so Kotlyarevsky ordered his soldiers to do a direct assault. At the Storming of Lankaran, the Russians took heavy casualties but managed to take the fortress and defeat the Iranians. During the assault, Kotlyarevsky was shot in the face, causing him to lose an eye and breaking his jaw. The Russian victory at Lankaran led to the end to the war and the signing of the Treaty of Gulistan, which made Iran cede territory to Russia.

After the war ended, Kotlyarevsky retired from the army. As a reward for his service, he was given a large amount of money by Tsar Alexander I, which he used to buy an estate in Feodosia. He then lived in Feodosia for the rest of his life, where he died in 1852. After his death, local artist Ivan Aivazovsky designed a mausoleum that was built for Kotlyarevsky in Feodosia. Aivazovsky also painted a posthumous portrait of Kotlyarevsky in 1871. Prince Vorontsov ordered a statue of Kotlyarevsky to be built in Ganja. Russian poet Alexander Pushkin dedicated the epilogue of his poem The Prisoner of the Caucasus to Pyotr Kotlyarevsky. In November 2020, a statue of Pyotr Kotlyarevsky made by Russian sculptor Andrei Korobtsov was unveiled in Crimea. The statue depicts Kotlyarevsky riding on a horse that tramples on a Persian carpet, symbolizing the defeat of Iran.
