= Allahverdi Afshar =

Iranian painter, active from 1815 until after 1825

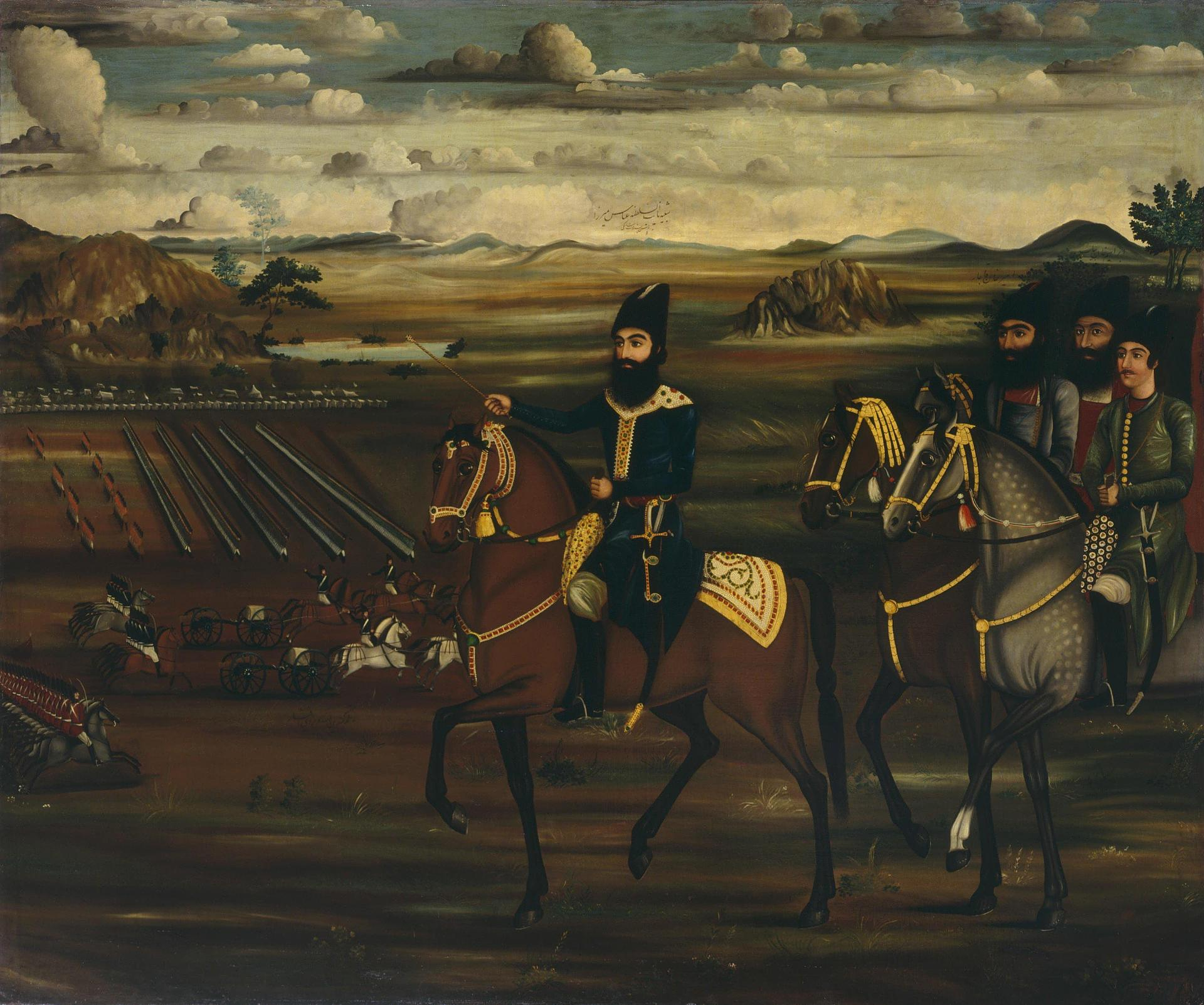
Illustration of the Qajar crown prince of Iran, Abbas Mirza, reviewing his troops. Made by Allahverdi Afshar in 1815.

Allahverdi Afshar (Persian: الله وردی افشار) was a painter in Qajar Iran, who was active from 1815 until after 1825. He belonged to the Qasimlu subgroup of the branch of the Afshar tribe that resided in the city of Urmia.

Allahverdi Afshar, who was active first in his home Urmia and subsequently at the court of crown prince Abbas Mirza in Tabriz, appears to have avoided Tehran's expanding influence, unlike most royal artists of the Qajar era (1779–1925). He oversaw the decoration of Urmia's Chahar Borj, which served as the residence of the hereditary governors who belonged to the same Afshar tribe as the artist. The contemporary American missionary Justin Perkins describes a fresco depicting Abbas Mirza hunting a boar at the palace, but he does not say who the artist was. The theme of the decorating shows that Allahverdi worked on the complex later, during the governorship of Hossein Qoli Khan Beglarbegi Afshar (1797–1821), even though the structure's development began during the Zand era (1751–1794). His extant paintings were created during this period.

Abbas Mirza's heavy dependence on Afshar manpower for his reformed army may have been the reason that Allahverdi managed to join the court.

In 1820, Abbas Mirza sent Allahverdi Afshar to the city of Tbilisi to learn about lithography and to buy the first lithographic printing press that would ever be used in Iran. It is possible that this press in Tabriz printed four volumes of Persian literature that were published between 1825 and 1832.

== Sources ==
- Szántó, Iván (2021). "Allāhvirdī Afshār". In Fleet, Kate; Krämer, Gudrun; Matringe, Denis; Nawas, John; Rowson, Everett (eds.). Encyclopaedia of Islam (3rd ed.). Brill Online. ISSN 1873-9830.
