= Pir Qoli Khan Qajar =

Pir Qoli Khan Qajar (Persian: پیرقلی خان قاجار) was an Iranian commander under the Qajar shahs (kings) Agha Mohammad Khan Qajar (r. 1789–1797) and Fath-Ali Shah Qajar (r. 1797–1834). During the Russo-Iranian War of 1804–1813, Pir Qoli Khan was a high-ranking commander under the crown prince Abbas Mirza and oversaw the northern part of the battleground during the siege of Erivan in 1804.

== Sources ==
- Behrooz, Maziar (2023). Iran at War: Interactions with the Modern World and the Struggle with Imperial Russia. I.B. Tauris. ISBN 978-0-7556-3737-9.
- Bournoutian, George (2021). From the Kur to the Aras: A Military History of Russia's Move into the South Caucasus and the First Russo-Iranian War, 1801–1813. Brill. ISBN 978-90-04-44515-4.
