= Capture of Abbasabad =

- Part of the Russo-Persian War of 1826–1828
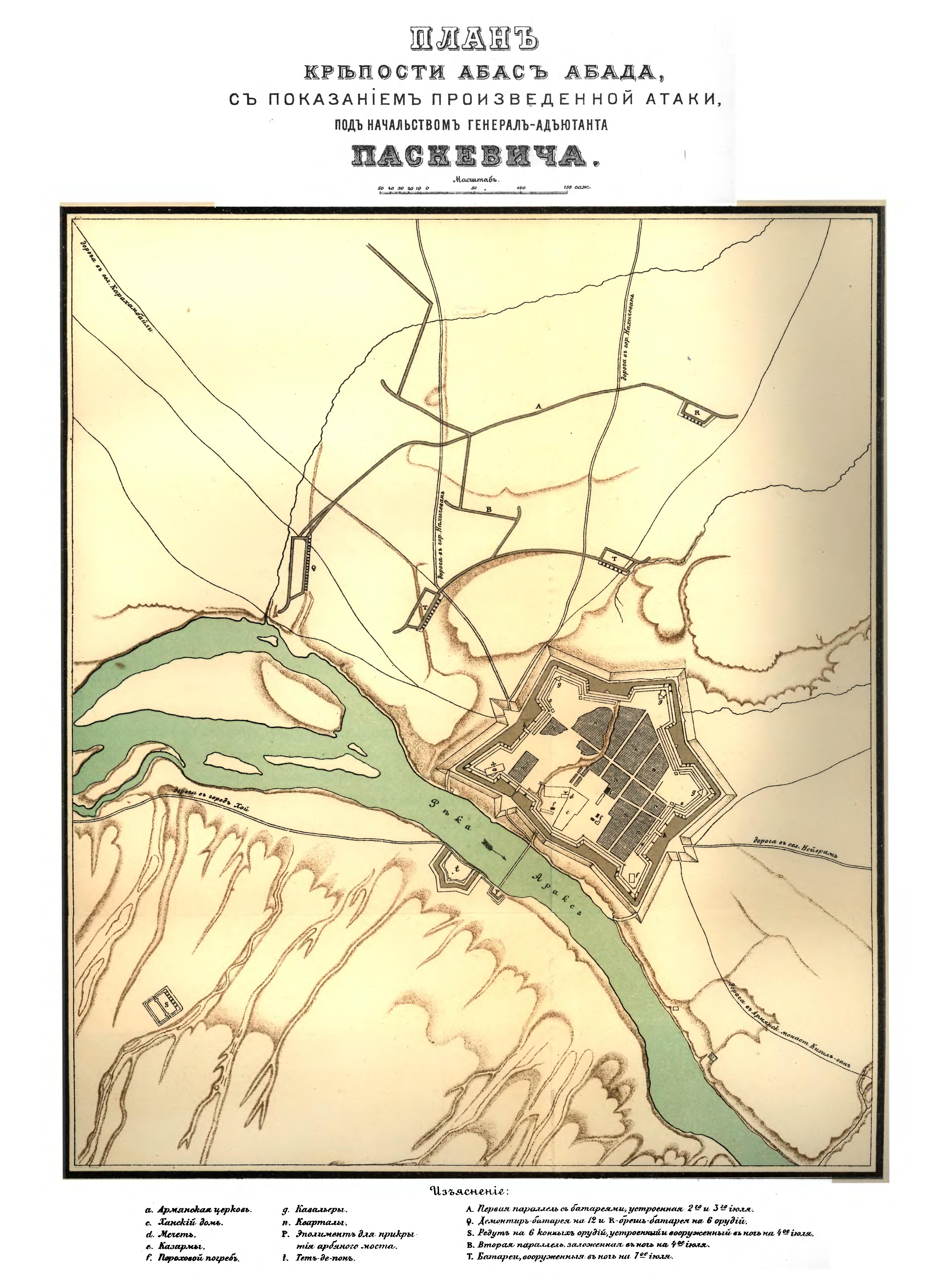
- Siege of Abbasabad
Date	July 13, 1827 – July 19, 1827
Location	Abbasabad
Result	Russian victory

Belligerents
(Russia) Russian Empire	Qajar Iran

Commanders and leaders
(Russia) Ivan Paskevich	Abbas Mirza

Strength
14 battalions 14 squadrons 6 Cossack regiments 42 cannons	40,000

Casualties and losses
41 killed	400 killed 3,000 captured

The Capture of Abbasabad was the siege and capture by Russian troops of the Persian fortress Abbasabad, in the Nakhichevan Khanate, during the Russo-Persian War of 1826–1828. The siege lasted from July 13 to 19 July, during which Russian troops defeated the Persian troops of the crown prince Abbas-Mirza. Soon after this, the fortress capitulated.

== Background ==
In March 1827, infantry general Paskevich took command of the Separate Caucasian Corps and the administration of the Caucasian Territory.

In April 1827, having besieged Erivan, Paskevich moved down the Araks to take Nakhichevan and the Abbas-Abad fortress, take possession of the Nakhichevan Khanate and thus thereby depriving the Erivan garrison of the opportunity to receive any help from this side. 14 battalions, 14 squadrons, 6 Cossack semi-regiments and 42 guns were assigned for the campaign to Nakhichevan.

On June 21, the main forces of the detachment set out on a campaign and a few days later captured Nakhichevan without a fight. In order not to leave an enemy fortress on his communications when advancing to Tavriz, Paskevich had to take Abbas-Abad. An additional factor was the opportunity to lure Abbas Mirza, who was standing with his army in a fortified camp beyond the Araks, 56 versts south of the fortress, into battle in the field, if he rushed to the aid of the besieged fortress.

After reconnaissance July 13, the siege of Abbas-Abad was begun, siege trenches were dug and several batteries were erected. July 15 artillery made gaps in the stone fence of the fortress. July 16 siege work approached the fortress by 165 steps, but Paskevich received news that Abbas Mirza was moving with a 40,000-strong army to help the besieged, and the siege work was discontinued. Leaving 3.5 battalions and 28 guns to cover the siege work and to guard warehouses in Nakhichevan, Paskevich decided with all the other troops (all cavalry, 8 infantry battalions and several field guns) to go forward and attack the enemy himself.

== Battle of Jevan-Bulak ==
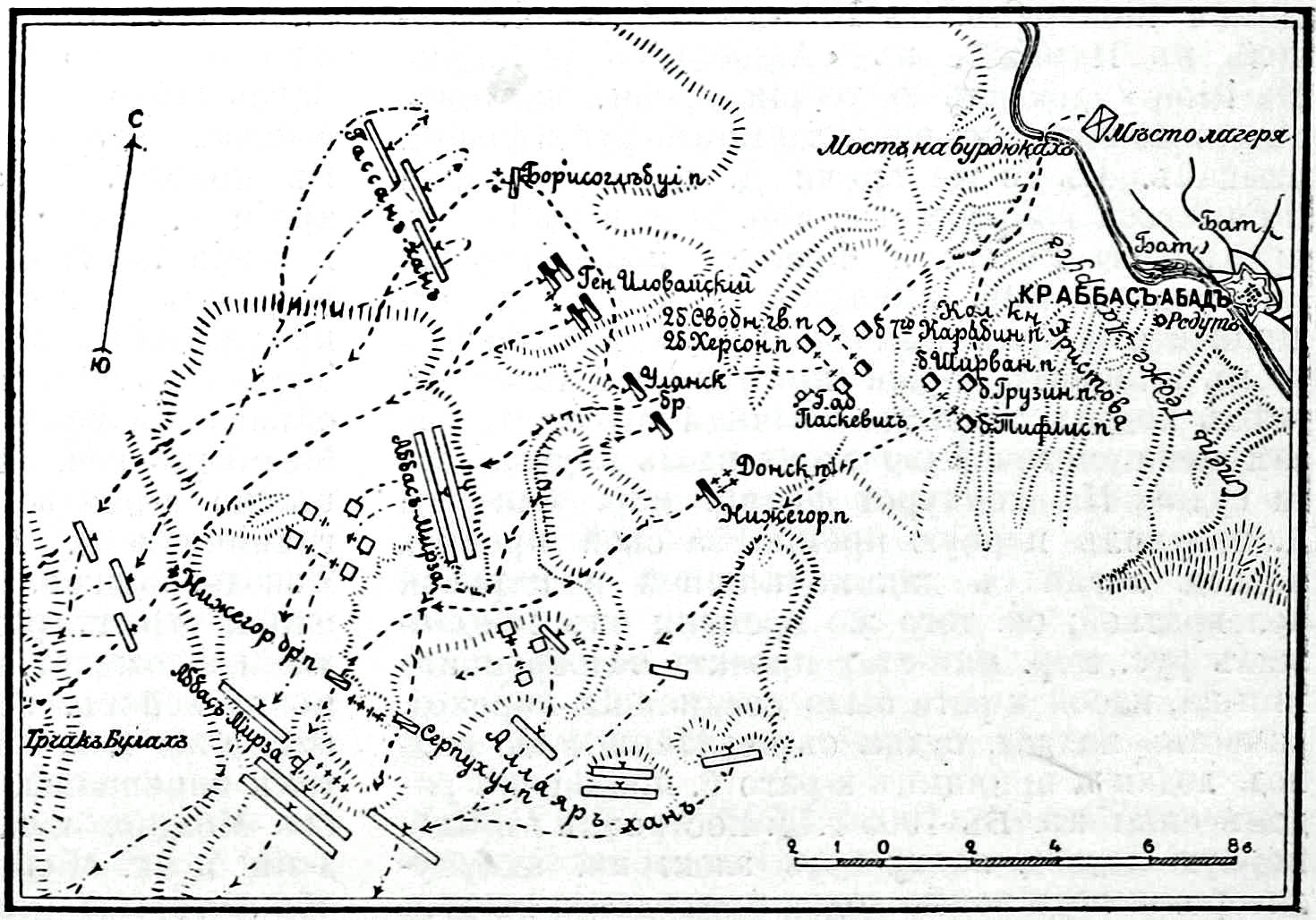
Battle plan for Jevan-Bulak

On July 5, at about 6 o'clock in the morning, a clash occurred between the advanced cavalry units and the enemy. Cossacks were sent to reinforce them under the command of Ilovaisky and after that the entire cavalry of the corps with horse artillery under the command of Benckendorf.

After the cavalry, Paskevich hastened to transport the infantry and directed it to the center of the enemy position. The Persians were shot down and, having retreated about four miles, took up a new fortified position, trying to stop the Russian advance. But the cavalry, under the command of Colonel Raevsky and Prince Andronnikov, did not give Abbas-Mirza time to settle in a new position. The infantry, following in the footsteps of the dragoons, immediately occupied the central hill, dominating the entire territory of the battlefield, and placed their battery here. The enemy took complete flight. The pursuit by infantry units continued until the Dzhevan-Bulak stream, which gave the name to the battle.

July 18 an offer to surrender was sent to the commandant of the fortress, but he asked for a 3-day delay. Paskevich, demanding unconditional surrender, ordered the shelling to continue and preparations for the assault. The defeat of the Persians at Dzhevan-Bulak deprived the garrison of Abbas-Abad of their last hope for liberation, and July 19 in the morning the fortress surrendered.

An important role in the fall of the fortress was played by Ehsan Khan Nakhichevansky, who, by agreement with the Russian command, surrendered it to Russian troops and went into Russian service. According to Count Paskevich, commanding the Nakhichevan Sarbaz battalion in the Abbas-Abad fortress, Ehsan Khan “rose up with him against the rest garrison and thus greatly contributed to the surrender of the said fortress to our troops". For this, Ehsan Khan was awarded the rank of colonel Russian service and he was appointed naibom of the Nakhichevan Khanate.

The local Armenian population also provided great assistance to the Russian army.

As a result, 2,700 prisoners and 23 guns became Russian trophies, and the victorious 101 cannon shots were fired from the captured guns. Paskevich was awarded the Order of St. Vladimir 1st degree.

== Consequences of taking the fortress ==
With the capture of the fortress, the Russians gained a foothold in the Nakhichevan Khanate; Griboedov was sent to begin peace negotiations. Russian administration was introduced in the Nakhichevan Khanate, the military and administrative power of the region was concentrated in the hands of the Abbas-Abad commandant, who appointed Major General Baron Osten-Saken.

The captured guns taken from the Abbas-Abad fortress after the war were presented to Nicholas I to the crown prince Abbas Mirza.

Subsequently, the fortress was abandoned and fell into disrepair.

== Evidence ==
Nerses Ashtaraketsi wrote the following about the occupation of the fortress:

On the evening of the nineteenth, - on the eve of the 20th, which falls on Wednesday, frightened by the fall of the southern wall, which collapsed from the shells of the so-called “siege” heavy weapons, Assan Khan and his entire army fled from the fortress. Pursuing him, our cavalry killed several hundred people where they overtook them. And so, having entered the fortress, the Russian army took possession of it peacefully, finding in it wheat, barley and various military equipment

Russian general, military historian V. A. Potto wrote:

Paskevich with the main forces entered the fortress on the morning of September 20, greeted by the Armenian clergy and population. 13 guns were taken from the fortress, large winter supplies of grain, which were very useful for troops in need of provisions, and many Russian prisoners were freed

== Sources ==
- Potto V. A. Caucasian War in separate essays, episodes, legends and biographies.
- Potto V. A. The Caucasian War in individual essays, episodes, legends and biographies.
- A. V. Shishov (2005). The Battle for the Caucasus. XVI-XXI centuries. Annexation of Eastern Armenia to Russia. Paskevich-Erivansky. Veche.
