= Eskandar Mirza (Qajar) =

Iranian prince (1810–1856)

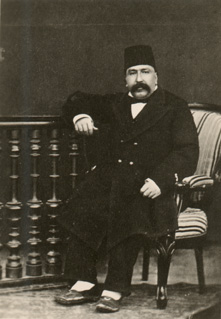
- Born: 1810; Qajar Iran
- Died: 1856 (aged 45–46); Tabriz, Qajar Iran
- Dynasty: Qajar
- Father: Abbas Mirza

Prince Eskandar Mirza (Persian: اسکندر میرزا; 1810–1856) was a son of Crown Prince Abbas Mirza and a grandson of Fath-Ali Shah Qajar. He was governor of Khoy and Salmas in 1832–1834 and governor of Qazvin in 1848–1852. He died at the age of 46 in 1856 in Tabriz. He is the ancestor of the Eskandari (Eskandari-Qajar) family.

== Offspring ==
- Prince Mohammad Taher Mirza
- Prince Mohammad Ali Mirza
- Prince Kamran Mirza
- Prince Yagob Mirza

== See also ==
- Mohtaram Eskandari
