= 14th Georgian Grenadier Regiment =

Georgian 14th Grenadier Regiment
- Грузинский 14-й гренадерский полк
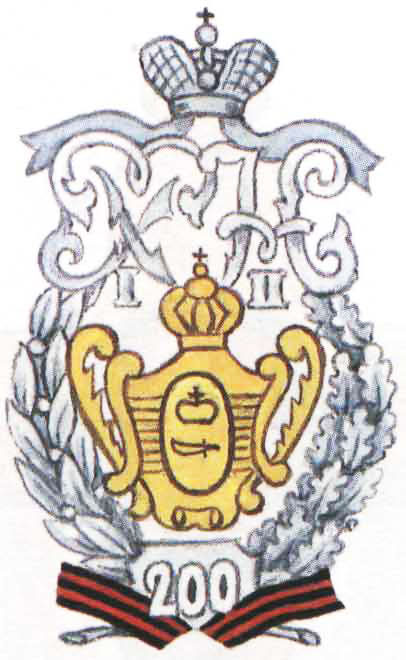
- Active: 1700 – 1918
- Country: Russian Empire
- Branch: Russian Imperial Army
- Role: Infantry (grenadier)
- Garrison/HQ: Tiflis Governorate
- Anniversaries: May 9
- Engagements: Russo-Persian War (1826–1828); Russo-Turkish War (1828–1829); Russo-Turkish War of 1877-78; World War I

The 14th Grenadier Georgian Heir-Tsarevich's Regiment (Russian: 14-й гренадерский Грузинский наследника цесаревича полк) was an infantry unit of the Russian Imperial Army. Tracing its history to a regiment originally established in 1700 and formally organized in 1784 as the Caucasus Infantry Regiment, it had taken part in wars against Persia and Turkey during the 19th century. During World War I it was part of the Caucasus Grenadier Division.

== History ==
The regiment was formally organized in 1784 as the Caucasus Infantry Regiment, although the formations from which it was originally established dated back to 1700 (founding of the Astrakhan Infantry Regiment). It was mostly stationed in the Caucasus and took part in the Russo-Persian War of 1826–1828, the Russo-Turkish War of 1828–1829, as well as the Russo-Turkish War of 1877–1878, for all of which the regiment was awarded multiple decorations. The regiment was stationed in the Tiflis Governorate and had received the name "14th Georgian" on 25 March 1864, along with the title of "His Imperial Highness Grand Duke Konstantin Nikolaevich's." On 25 March 1891 the name of one of its former commanders, General Pyotr Kotlyarevsky, was added to its name, which it kept until 30 July 1912 when it became the 14th Georgian His Imperial Majesty Heir-Tsarevich's Regiment. During World War I, the regiment was part of the Caucasus Grenadier Division of the 2nd Caucasus Army Corps.
