= Soltanabad, Saatly =

Coordinates: 39°51′N 48°38′E

Soltanabad is a village and municipality in the Saatly Rayon of Azerbaijan. The village was raised to municipality status in 2004. The Battle of Sultanabad was fought nearby in 1812.

The village is located near the villages Mircəlal and Nəsimikənd.
