= Battle of Aslanduz =

1812 battle of the Russo-Persian War

- Part of the Russo-Persian War (1804–1813)
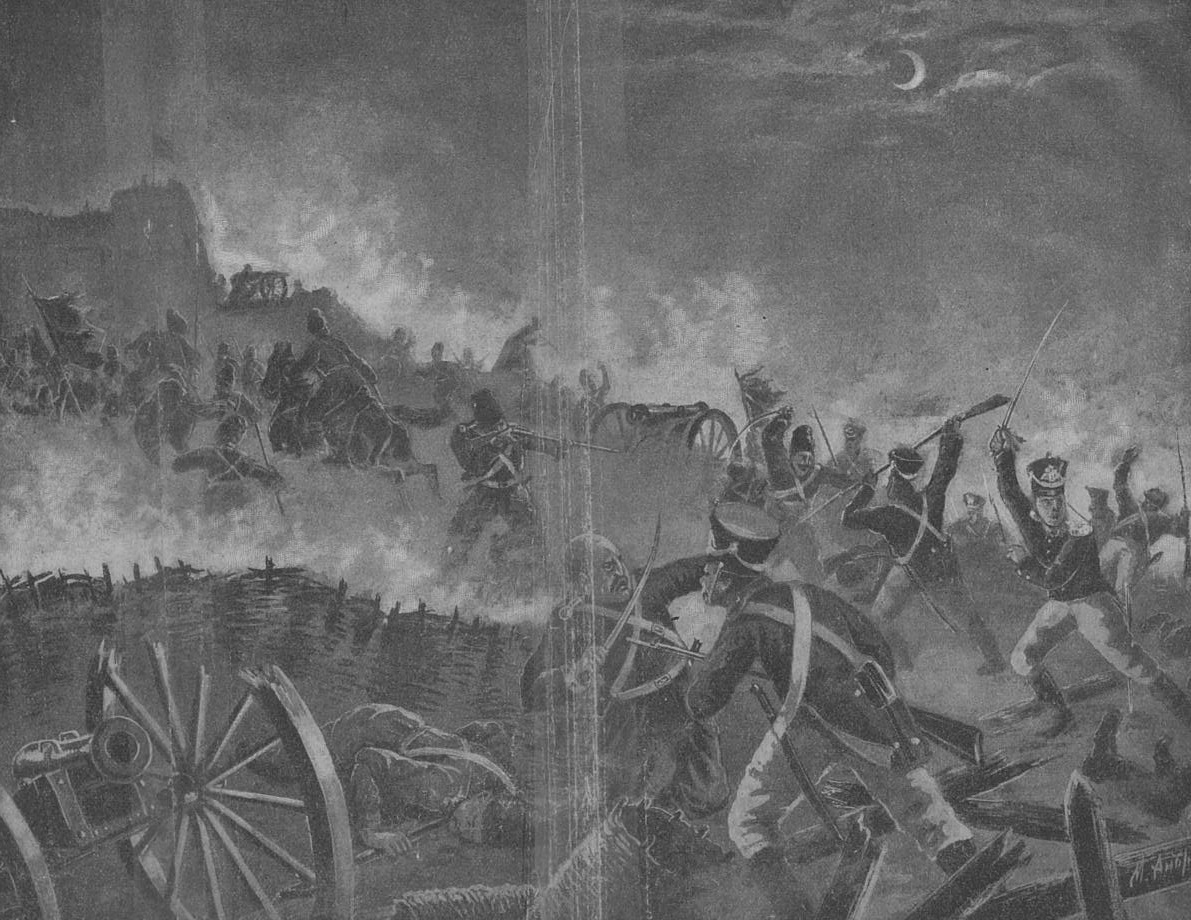
| Date | 31 October – 1 November 1812 |
| Location | Aslan Duz, North Bank of the Aras River (South Caucasus) 39°26′38″N 47°24′20″E |
| Result | Russian victory |

Belligerents
| Russian Empire | Qajar Iran |

Commanders and leaders
| (Russian Empire) Pyotr Kotlyarevsky | Fath-Ali Shah; Abbas Mirza; Dowlatshah |

Strength
| 2,000 | 5,000 or 30,000; 13 artillery pieces |

Casualties and losses
| 28 killed 99 wounded | 5,000 casualties incl. 2,000 killed and over 500 captured 11 artillery pieces |
- Location within Iran Battle of Aslanduz (Caucasus Mountains)

The Battle of Aslanduz took place on 31 October and 1 November 1812 between the Russian Empire and Qajar Iran during the Russo-Persian War (1804-1813). Russian Imperial army, smaller in number, defeated the Persian troops and captured the spoils.

== Background ==
In March 1812, the British ambassador to Persia signed a peace treaty to ally the country with Persia. In the same year, Napoleon's troops invaded Russia. The Russian Empire tried to make peace with Persia but were unable to come to an agreement.

== Battle ==
The Persian commander Fath Ali Shah stationed his forces, led by his two heirs, Abbas Mirza and Dowlatshah, in Aslanduz. Russian forces under the command of Major General Pyotr Kotlyarevsky launched a surprise night attack and routed the Persians, who were still sleeping. Kotlyarevsky then quickly moved on to storm Lankaran successfully in early 1813 which ended any Persian hope of continuing the war or settling on a stalemate for both parties.

The Persian casualties numbered around 2,000 killed and 500 captured. The Russians lost 38 men with 99 wounded. Among those killed during the battle was Charles Christie, a British officer in the service of Iran.

== See also ==
- Battle of Sultanabad – Part of the Russo-Persian War (1812)
- Siege of Lankaran – 1813 battle of the Russo-Iranian War

== Sources ==
- Atkin, Muriel (1980). Russia and Iran, 1780–1828. University of Minnesota Press. ISBN 978-0816609246.
- Behrooz, Maziar (2023). Iran at War: Interactions with the Modern World and the Struggle with Imperial Russia. I.B. Tauris. ISBN 978-0755637379.
- Bournoutian, George (2021). From the Kur to the Aras: A Military History of Russia's Move into the South Caucasus and the First Russo-Iranian War, 1801–1813. Brill. ISBN 978-9004445154.
- Krugov, Alexei I.; Nechitailov, Maxim V. (2016). Персидская армия в войнах с Россией. 1796-1828 гг. [Persian army in wars with Russia, 1796-1828]. Ratnoe delo (in Russian). Moscow: Russkie vityazy. ISBN 978-5-9907714-9-9.
