= Karyagin's Raid =

- Part of the Russo-Persian War (1804–1813)
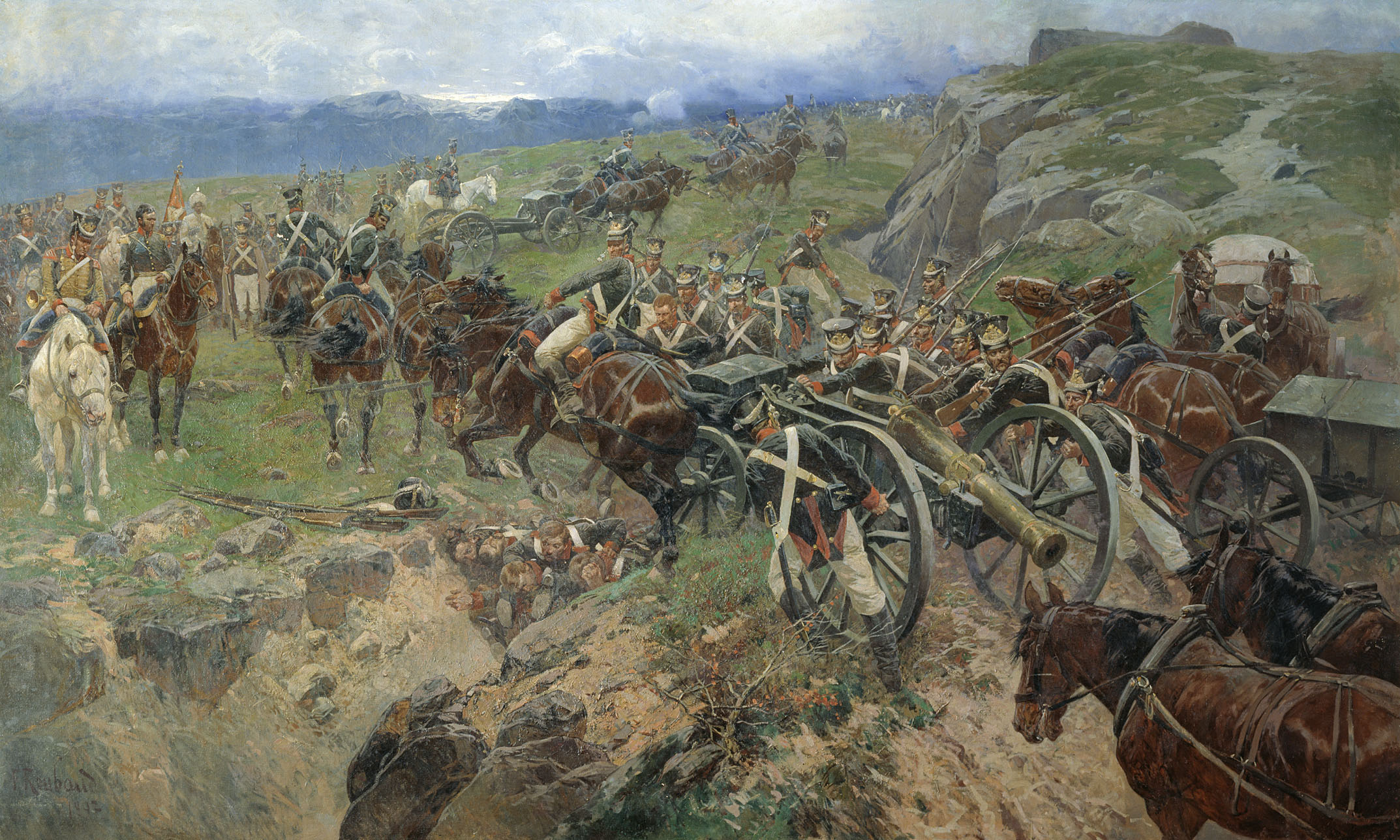
- Franz Roubaud's painting "The Living Bridge". Episode of the transition of the Russian detachment from Shakhbulag to Mukhrat.
Date	3–27 July [O.S. 24 June–15 July] 1805
Location	Aghdara District and Aghdam District; Modern day Azerbaijan
Result	Russian victory

Belligerents
Russia	Qajar Iran

Commanders and leaders
(Russian Empire) Pavel Karyagin (WIA) (Russian Empire) Pyotr Kotlyarevsky (WIA)	Abbas Mirza; Emir-khan †

Units involved
17th Jaeger Regiment; Tiflis Musketeer Regiment; 7th Artillery Regiment	

Strength
Total: 493; 354 jägers 113 Tiflis musketeers 26 artillery crew 2 guns 68 horses	30,000 (Note: This was the peak size of the Persian force during this engagement.)

Casualties and losses
90 killed 189 wounded 58 deserted 60 horses killed	Exact number unknown Anywhere from several hundred to several thousand killed 15 falconets lost

Karyagin's raid, also known as the Persian campaign of Colonel Karyagin (Russian: Персидский Поход Полковника Карягина), and as the Qarabagh-Ganjeh campaign in Iranian sources, was a military campaign that took place during the Russo-Persian War (1804-1813).

In 1805, a Persian army under the command of Abbas Mirza tried to conquer Russian territories in the Caucasus. To stall the advance of the Persians, Pavel Tsitsianov send small detachments to reinforce several garrisons in the region. One detachment of consisting of Jägers from the 17th regiment under the command of Pavel Karyagin was intercepted by the Persians in the mountains.

For the next three weeks, Karyagin's small army would repel numerous Persian attacks while performing a strategic retreat. Karyagin's campaign stalled the advance of the Persian army, which prevented the Persians from capturing Russian territories in the Caucasus.

== Background ==
=== Persian invaision of Karabakh ===
In 1805, the Treaty of Kurakchay was concluded, according to which Russia annexed Karabakh. However, at the same time, the War of the Third Coalition was taking place in Europe. Russia took an active part in them and therefore could not maintain large forces in the Caucasus or send reinforcements to the region. The Iranians planned to take advantage of this and retake the territory of Karabakh. To do this, they tried to raise 100,000 troops. In June 1805, the Persian army of Abbas Mirza crossed the Qarqarçay river and invaded the Karabakh region. Such an action was anticipated by Tsitsianov, the Russian chief commander in the region.

Near the Qarqarçay river Major Lisanevich, commanded a garrison near Shusha, at a place called Khan-bagh. He had the battalion of the 17th Jäger Regiment and two hundred cavalry, a total of 500 men, set out along the road toward the river. However, the Persian army already crossed the river using a different ford and invaded the territory. A Persian vanguard numbering 3000 men secured a lodgement before Major Lisanevich could stop them. Soon, the bulk of the Persian army, numbering 10,000 men, passed the bridge near which Lisanevich was stationed. The Persians engaged with Lisanevich’s small detachment, but they were repelled with accurate artillery and rifle fire. After failing to defeat Lisanevich, the Persian vanguard retreated across the river, where they received reinforcements and reentered into southern Karabakh. The Persians started to quickly gain territory and occupy villages.

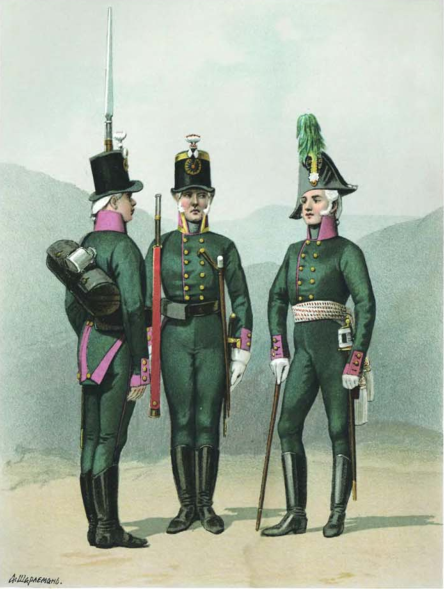
Uniform of the 17th Jäger Regiment.

Meanwhile, Major Lisanevich, who lacked cavalry to stop the Persians on the river, retreated from Jabrayil toward Shusha. From there, he sent a message to Tsitsianov about the Persian invasion. Upon receiving news of the Persian invasion, Tsitsianov ordered Colonel Karyagin, commander of the 17th Jäger Regiment, to head to Shusha with reinforcements. There, Karyagin was supposed to assume command of Lisanevich’s detachment and, with the assistance of Armenian allies, to halt the Persian invasion near Shusha. This action was supposed to buy time for Tsitsianov to gather his forces.

When Karyagin marched out of Elisavetpol, his detachment consisted of the following:

- 354 jägers
- 113 Tiflis musketeers
- 26 artillery crew
- 2 guns
- 68 horses

Total: 493 men, 2 guns, and 68 horses.

== Campaign ==
=== Karyagin’s march to Shusha and first encounter with the Persians ===
Tsitsianov knew Karyagin well, the two served together for a long period. Tsitsianov hoped that Karyagin and Lisanevich could perform a double-pincer attack and force the Persians to retreat. However, Lisanevich’s hasty retreat to Shusha disrupted Tsitsianov’s ambitions at the very outset. On June 18, Colonel Karyagin departed from Elisavetpol and marched towards Shusha, which was located about 100 versts away.

A cemetery on top of a kurgan mound - the tract of Kara-agach-Baba. Karyagin used this cemetery as a defensive position for several days.

On June 24, beyond the Khachenaget stream, Karyagin encountered the Persians. His army first encountered a scouting party before meeting the vanguard of 3000 Persian cavalrymen. Karyagin formed his troops into a square, while skirmishers under the command of Kotlyarevsky occupied nearby heights. In such formation, Karyagin’s army continued marching towards Shusha. The Persian cavalry repeatedly attacked the Russian detachment, but each time they were repulsed with accurate rifle volleys. The Russian army continued advancing in their squared formations for six hours, they marched 14 versts during those six hours. Then, the Russians reached the Qarqarçay river. There, Karyagin spotted a kurgan burial mound near the tract Kara-agach-Baba. On top of the kurgan, there was a cemetery, which was enclosed by earthworks on every side. Karyagin ordered his army to make camp in the cemetery.

At about five o’clock in the afternoon. A Persian army of 10,000 men was spotted in the distance. It was only a part of Abbas Mirza’s army. The Russian jägers had barely enough time to recover or to make fortifications. At about six o’clock in the evening, the Persians launched an assault.

=== June 24 to June 27 - Defense at the cemetery ===
Karyagin allowed the Persian cavalry to approach within range, and then he repulsed it with coordinated volleys from muskets and artillery. For the next three hours, until nightfall, the Persians launched a series of attacks. All Persian attacks were beaten back by the accurate fire of the jägers and musketeers. Despite being outnumbered, the Russian army had a terrain advantage. The kurgan provided an uphill advantage, which slowed down Persian attacks. The cemetery earthworks provided good cover against Persian artillery. Finally, the mountainous terrain of the region prevented the Persians from using all of their forces at once – only a small part of the Persian army could actually attack the Russian positions. The same day Karyagin managed to send messengers to Major Lisanevich and to the Khan of Karabakh. In both messages, Karyagin requested assistance. Even after three days, no reply came from anyone. Lisanevich believed it was too risky to leave Shusha. The Khan of Karabakh allied with the Persians.

Uniform of Persian soldiers from the army of Abbas Mirza.

At nightfall, the Persians stopped attacking and withdrew. During the night, they started building artillery batteries for falconets. Meanwhile, the Russian army spent the night fortifying their position. They deepened the moat around the cemetery and raised the earthworks. The detachment’s wagons were used to build a wagon fort. The cemetery’s mosque was also fortified and manned by a small picket of skirmishers under Lieutenant Lisenko, who distinguished himself during the assault on Ganja. At dawn on June 25, four Persian falconet batteries commenced bombardment. The Russian position was struck from every side by cannonballs. Thanks to the earthworks, most of the cannonballs passed overheads. By this point, the Russians lost several killed and many wounded. Among the wounded were Major Kotlyarevsky and Karyagin. As the day progressed, the summer sun, heat, and thirst exhausted the Russians. Regardless, the Russians held firm. They were encouraged by Karyagin and Kotlyarevsky, both of whom continued to fight and work despite their wounds.

As the Persians attempted more attacks, the Russians repelled them with rifle volleys and artillery. On some occasions, the Russians performed sorties once they repelled Persian attacks. Karyagin thought of fighting his way toward Shusha, only 25 versts away, but he did not attempt it due to many of his men being wounded and many horses being killed. The same day, Karyagin was offered to surrender, he refused. By the evening of June 25, the Persians cut off the Russian encampment from water by setting up four falconet batteries on the other side of the Qarqarçay river. In response, Karyagin gathered one hundred jägers for a sortie. On the night of June 26-27, in a well-coordinated sortie, the Russian jägers exited the camp, forced the river, and overran all four batteries, which were poorly prepared for a Russian counterattack. In less than 30 minutes, the Russians overran all four batteries and captured 15 falconets. The Russians could not hold the captured positions for long, so they destroyed the falconets and threw them into the river. The one hundred jägers returned before dawn, without losing a single man.

The next morning, at dawn, a larger Persian army arrived under the command of Abbas Mirza. At this point, the Persian army was estimated to have 15,000 men. Abbas Mirza commenced artillery bombardment and ordered a cavalry attack to capture the Russian positions. The Russians repulsed the attack with coordinate rifle volleys at close range and artillery grapeshot.

The battle continued intermittently throughout the day. Both sides exchanged fire. The Persian artillery damaged Russian wagons and killed horses. At four o’clock in the afternoon, Lieutenant Lisenko, and 36 men, deserted their positions and surrendered to the Persians. Lisenko provided intel about the state of the Russian army and the defensive weakspots. With this information, Abbas Mirza launched another assault, but his army was once again repelled. Afterwards, unwilling to sacrifice more troops against the small Russian force, Abbas Mirza made no further attacks. For the rest of the day, the action was limited to both sides exchanging fire. As night fell, another 19 men deserted the Russian camp and surrendered. By the end of June 27, the Russian army was exhausted. Many men were wounded. Supplies and ammunition was running low. There were few artillery charges left for the two cannons. Karyagin made a plan to sneak out of the encirclement and capture the castle of Shahbulag, which had better defensive capabilities than the cemetery.

=== June 28 to July 7 - Defense at the Shahbulag Castle ===
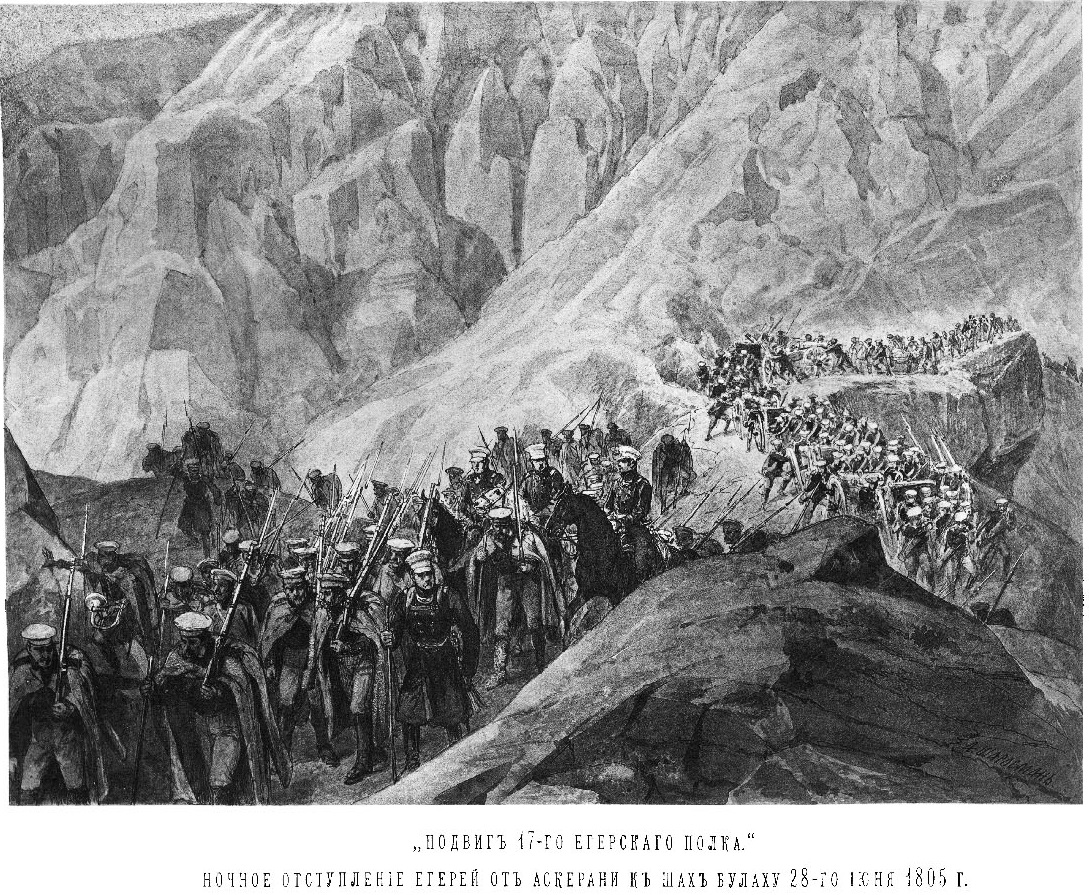
Karyagin's army marches to the Shahbulag Castle. Caption under illustration: The night retreat of Russian jäegers from the Qarqarçay river to Shahbulag - June 28 1805. Note: The Russian uniform was different than what is shown in this illustration.

Karyagin's plan to march to the Shahbulag castle appealed to his men. Before setting out, Karyagin sent a messenger to Tsitsianov. During the night of June 27-28, the Russian army snuck out of the encirclement and marched towards the Shahbulag castle, which was located about 10 versts from their position. A local Armenian ally named Vani, who knew the local terrain very well, guided Karyagin’s army. The Russian army barely had enough horses to carry the guns and the wounded. After marching a short distance, the Russian army encountered a small Persian patrol. The engagement alarmed Abbas Mirza's camp. Small Persian detachments of 2000 men tried to intercept the Russians on route to Shahbulag castle, but all detachments failed to find the Russian army in the dark mountainous terrain. By dawn, Karyagin’s army reached Shahbulag. The castle stood at the foot of a rocky hill. It had six towers and stone cliffs, small forests, and orchards surrounded it. The castle was occupied by 150 Persian soldiers, who were unaware of Karyagin’s plans.

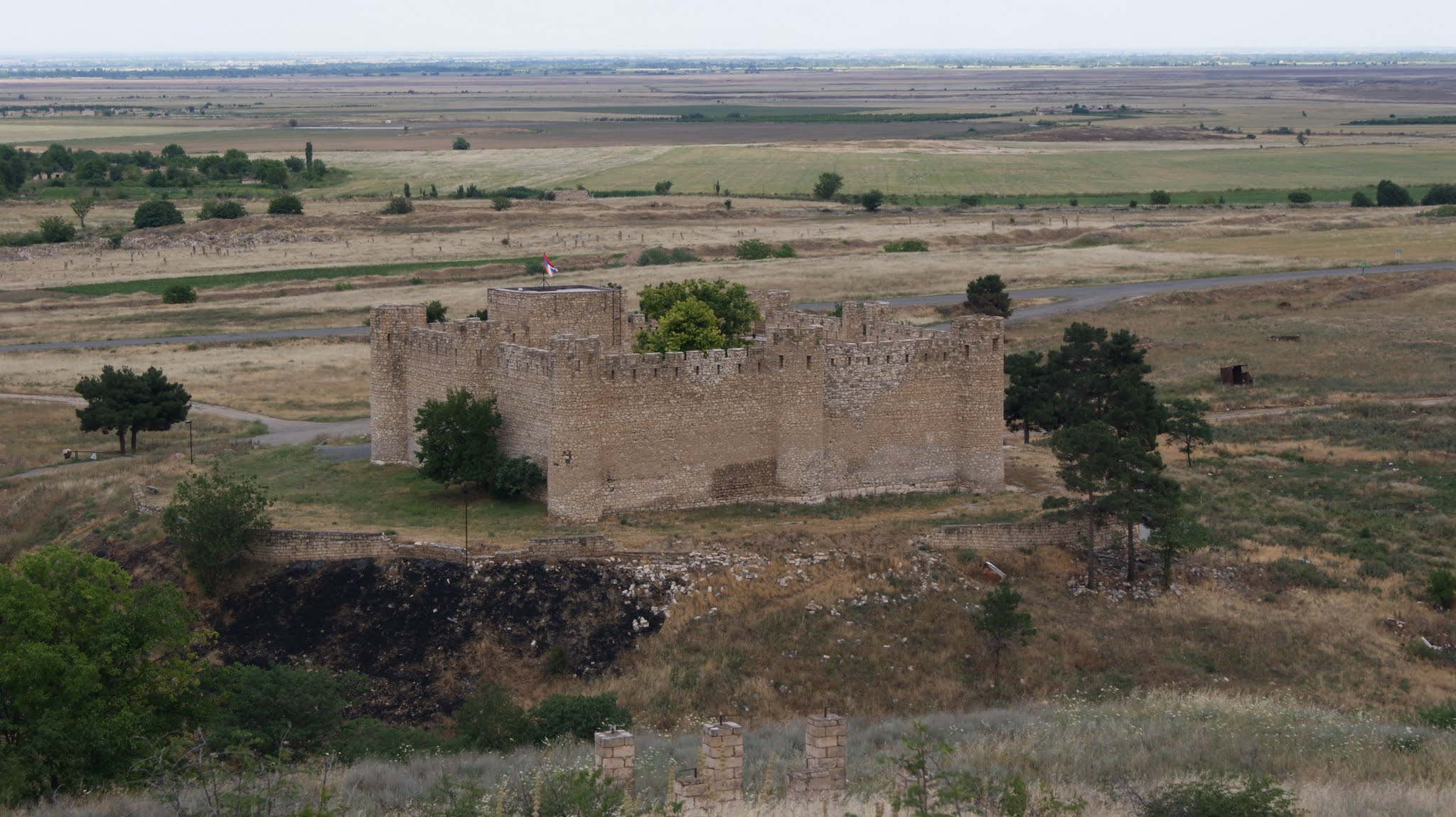
Shahbulag Castle in the present. In June 1805, Karyagin's army captured this castle and used it as a stronghold against the larger Persian army.

In a surprise attack, the Russian artillery burst open the castle’s gate while the jägers charged the castle from a nearby forest. The small Persian garrison had little opportunity to defend and was soon defeated. The Persian garrison lost 30 men killed including both garrison commanders.

The Russian casualties were minimal. By capturing the castle, the Russians secured a small supply of weapons, gunpowder, artillery shells, and 17 horses. Karyagin’s army had barely enough time to repair the gates as two hours later the main Persian army arrived. Abbas Mirza ordered an assault in an attempt to capture the castle. However, the assault failed. The castle had good defensive capabilities, it was located on a hill slope, which made it harder to storm, and the Persians lacked the necessary siege equipment. After the failed assault, Abbas Mirza encircled the castle and besieged it. He was hoping to starve the exhausted Russian army. By this point, only 179 out of Karyagin’s 493 men were healthy and uninjured – the rest of the surviving men were wounded. The Russian artillery cartridges were also running low. They only had 9 cannonballs, 17 grenades, and 17 grapeshot left. Russian food supplies were depleted and men resorted to eating horsemeat. During their ten-day stay in the castle, Karyagin ordered small groups of soldiers sneak out and forage for food, but all attempts were fruitless.

Abbas Mirza was aware of the Russian exhaustion, which cause him to enter into negotiations with Karyagin. Both sides agreed to a ceasefire. A part of the ceasefire agreement allowed Karyagin to send letters to Tsitsianov. Abbas Mirza made a firman that allowed one Russian messenger to reach Tsitsianov. The messenger delivered letters from Karyagin and Abbas Mirza. Tsitsianov replied to Karyagin the next day. Abbas Mirza considered the small Russian garrison at Shahbulag as his prisoners. He sent them small amounts of various provisions and game. During the three-day truce, Abbas Mirza tried to coax the Russians into surrendering. Karyagin refused each time. Soon, Karyagin received intel from local allies that the Persian army is due to receive reinforcements. Fearing that the reinforced Persian army could overrun the castle, Karyagin decided to sneak out with his army and march to a safer location. The day before sneaking out, Karyagin sent Abba Mirza a letter which stated that tomorrow, the latter may enter the castle.

=== July 7 to July 15 - Moving to the Mukhrat Castle and Tsitsianov's relief ===
On July 7th, at 10 o'clock in the night, Karyagin, gathered his men and snuck out from Shahbulag. He was heading for the castle of Mukhrat, located near Mokhratagh in the Aghdara District. That castle had better defensive capabilities and it was unoccupied by the Persians. In order to cover the secret retreat, Karyagin ordered thirty of his men to remain behind in the Shahbulag castle and call out for each other, thus creating an illusion that the Russians were still in the castle. The first to sneak out were the two cannons and the wounded. Then, the bulk of the Russian army snuck out. Finally, the thirty men who remained behind also left at a given signal. The entire army would regroup two hours before dawn. During the night retreat, the Russians encountered a small Persian patrol, which was scattered by a Russian rifle volley. The alarmed Persian army failed to spot which direction the Russian army went in the dark.

The cannons being transported on the soldiers' shoulders over the ditch. Caption under illustration: The heroic death of a soldier from the 17th Jäger Regiment, Sidorov. Note: The Russian uniform was different than what is shown in this illustration.

Karyagin’s army marched 20 versts through the mountains. Then, they encountered an unexpected obstacle, a wide deep ditch in the middle of a narrow mountain pass. Men and horses could cross the ditch, but the guns could not be crossed. There was no timber, or any other building material, in sight in order to fill the ditch. It was also impossible to go around the ditch because it ran a long distance and adjoined a high mountain. The two cannons were too valuable in order to be abandoned. Then, one Russian jaeger named Gavrilo Sidorov, a model soldier and a renowned joker, took the initiative. He jumped into the ditch and demonstrated how they could build a bridge makeshift bridge using their bodies as posts and their rifles as planks. About ten other men followed Sidorov and jumped into the ditch. Together they quickly formed a platform, the action was so hasty that no one thought about possible consequences. One cannon was transported over the makeshift bridge with ease. However, the second cannon slipped and its wheel hit Sidorov in the head. Although the second cannon was also transported over the ditch, Gavrilo Sidorov died instantly due to his injury. Sidorov was buried on site.

The ruins of Mukhrat Castle, illustration made in 1901. In July 1805, Karyagin's army occupied this castle to avoid a large scale Persian assault. Top illustration depicts the general view of the castle's ruins. Bottom-left depicts a top-down plan of the castle. Bottom-right depicts a sketch of the castle's surrounding area.

On the morning of July 8, Karyagin’s army reached Kusapat and stopped there for rest and food. The castle of Mukhrat was only five versts away. Karyagin ordered the sick and wounded to go there first under the command of Kotlyarevsky. Karyagin marched out later with the rest of his army. About three versts from the castle, Karyagin’s army encountered pursuing Persian troops. There were about 1500 Persians pursuing Karyagin. The Persians launched several attacks, all of which were unsuccessful because the narrow mountain pass prevented the Persians from using all of their forces at once. Karyagin’s detachment performed a fighting retreat until they reached Mukhrat, which was already secured by Kotlyarevsky. After reaching the castle, Karyagin’s remaining army was saved. The Mukhrat castle was large, it had good defensive capabilities, and it was located in a remote mountainous area. A large Persian army would not have enough space to surround and besiege the castle. In response, Abbas Mirza left a small detachment of 2000 soldiers to block the road leading to Mukhrat castle and he marched further north towards Ganja with the rest of his army. While staying in Mukhrat castle, Karyagin ordered small parties of soldiers to forage for food in nearby Armenian villages. This time, the Russians succeeded in securing a sufficient amount of food. The Armenian guide Vani also arranged for food to be delivered to the castle. From there Karyagin also sent messengers to Tsitsianov. The two officer communicated with each other until the latter arrived to drive away the Persians.

The remainder of Karyagin's army meets with Tsitsianov's relief army.

Tsitsianov left Elisavetpol with a battalion of the Tiflis Regiment and part of the 17th Regiment jaegers. He had an army of 2371 men, including one hundred Cossacks, and 10 cannons. He marched out towards Shusha on July 11. Five days later, Tsitsianov drove the Persians away from the Terter River. On July 15, he set up camp near the village of Mardagishti. From there he sent a messenger to Karyagin and waited for his arrival. Karyagin’s army snuck out of the castle during the night, they bypassed the Persian detachment that was guarding the road, and marched towards Mardagishti. In the early morning, Karyagin’s detachment joined with Tsitsianov’s army.

== Aftermath ==
According to a report made by Karyagin, he lost:

- 90 men killed
- 189 wounded.
- 58 men deserted
- 60 horses killed.

By the end of the action, 345 men survived, over half of whom were wounded.

Karyagin's army fought Abbas Mirza's 20,000-strong army for three weeks. By doing so he stalled the Persian advance and bought enough time for Tsitsianov to assemble an army in Elisavetpol. The summer campaign of 1805 lasted for several more weeks during which the Persian army of Abbas-Mirza was defeated in several battles near Elisavetpol and Zagam River. As a result of those battles, the Persian army was driven out of the Karabakh. The war would continue until 1813 and it would end in a Russian victory.

Karyagin received a Golden Weapon for his courage in the campaign. However, he would die in 1807 partly due to the stress and injuries he suffered during the campaign. Major Kotlyarevsky was awarded the Order of St. Vladimir, 4th Class, for his valour during the action. All other Russian officers were awarded with various awards including the Order of St. Anna.

The Armenian ally Vani Aryutin, who helped to guide Karyagin’s army and brought them supplies was awarded the rank of an ensign and a lifetime pension of 200 silver rubles.

== Memory ==
The cemetery is now open to the participants of the raid. Karyagin himself received the Order of St. George and the golden sword personally from the tsar.

== Bibliography ==
- Bournoutian, George (2021). From the Kur to the Aras. A Military History of Russia's Move into the South Caucasus and the First Russo-Iranian War, 1801—1813. Iranian Studies, Volume 22. Brill. ISBN 978-90-04-44515-4.
- Егоршина, Петрова (2023). История русской армии [The history of the Russian Army] (in Russian). Moscow: Edition of the Russian Imperial Library. ISBN 978-5-699-42397-2.
- Potto, Vasily (1889). Кавказская война: Подвиг полковника Карягина [Caucasus war: the feat of Colonel Karyagin] (in Russian).
