= Caucasus Grenadier Division (Russian Empire) =

- Russian: Кавказская гренадерская дивизия
- Active: 1819–1918
- Allegiance: Russian Empire
- Branch: Imperial Russian Army
- Engagements: Russo-Turkish War of 1877-78; World War I; Russian Civil War

The Caucasus Grenadier Division (Russian: Кавказская гренадерская дивизия) was an infantry unit of the Russian Imperial Army. By the time of World War I, it was garrisoned at Tiflis and was part of the 2nd Caucasus Army Corps. It would later also take part in the Russian Civil War on the side of the White movement.

== Combat chronicle ==
The Caucasus Grenadier Division saw action since the first days of World War I. In October–September 1914 the division took part in fighting against the German Army in the Augustów Forest (in modern-day Poland) during the East Prussia Operation, and later that month fought in the First Battle of the Masurian Lakes. From November 22–29, 1914, the division fought in the defense of Warsaw. In the spring of 1915 it took part in defending the Bzura River and later in the Siege of Novogeorgievsk. In May 1915, the Caucasus Grenadier Division fought in the defense of Galicia. Later during the Russian Civil War, some of the unit's members would join the Volunteer Army at Tsaritsyn.

== Organization ==
- 1st Brigade
  - 13th Yerevan Grenadier Regiment
  - 14th Georgian Grenadier Regiment
- 2nd Brigade
  - 15th Tiflis Grenadier Regiment
  - 16th Mingrelian Grenadier Regiment
- Caucasus Grenadier Artillery Brigade

== Commanders ==
- 1849–1850: KA Belgard
- 1868–1877: Iosif Davydovich Tarkhan-Mouravov
- 1885–1893: SA Avinov
- 1917: Boris Petrovich Veselovzorov
- 1917–1918: Boris Shaposhnikov

== Chiefs of Staff ==
- 1917: Johan Laidoner
