= Siege of Lankaran =

1813 battle of the Russo-Iranian War

- Part of the Russo-Persian War (1804–1813)
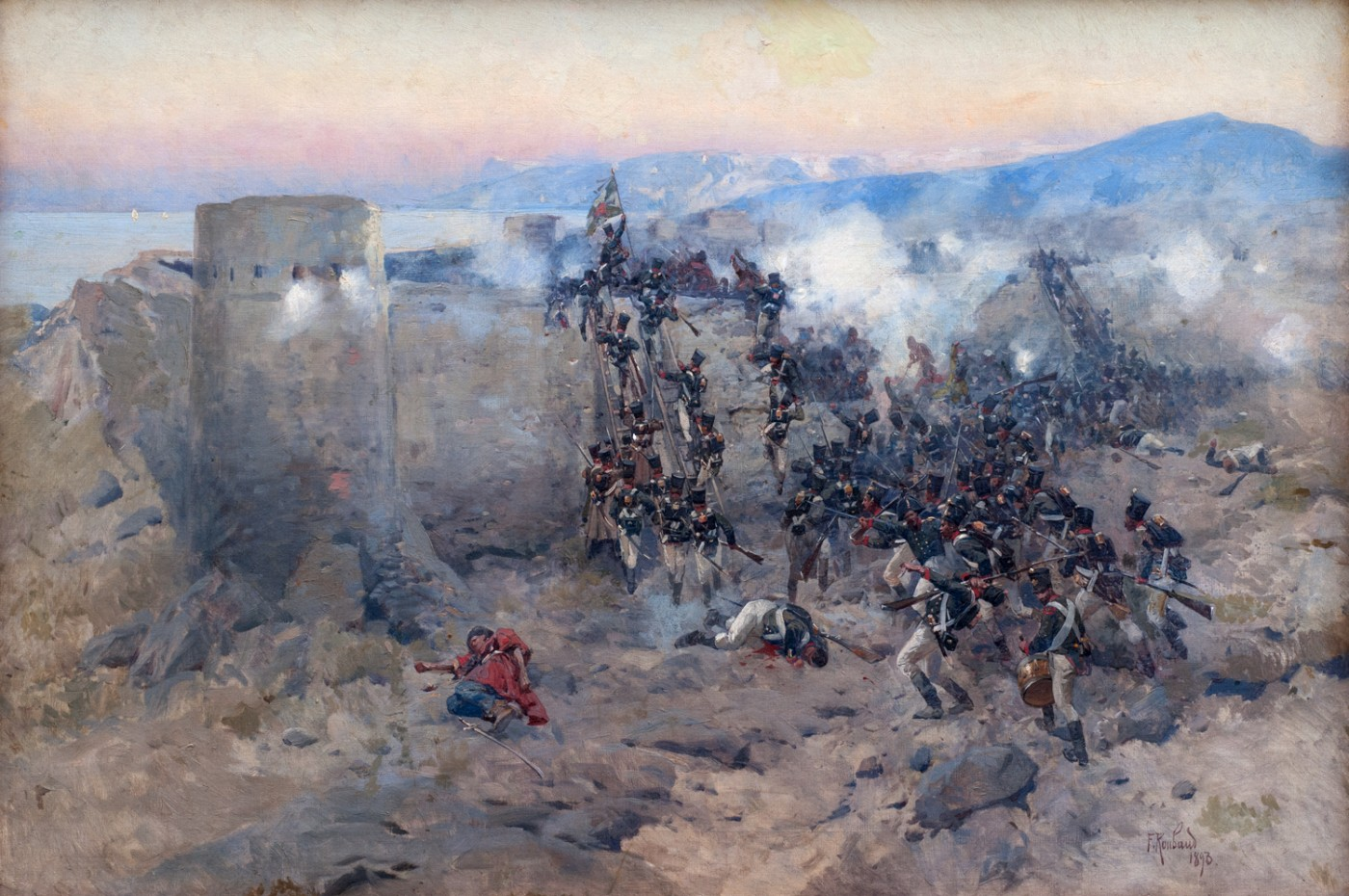
- History painting of the siege by Franz Roubaud, dated 1893
Date	7 January – 13 January 1813
Location	Lankaran, Talish, Qajar Iran
Result	Russian victory

Belligerents
(Russia) Russian Empire	Qajar Iran

Commanders and leaders
(Russia) Pyotr Kotlyarevsky (WIA)	Sadeq Qajar †

Strength
1,661 soldiers 59 officers 37 military bands	4,000 soldiers

Casualties and losses
325 soldiers and 16 officers killed 584 soldiers and 25 officers wounded	3,737 soldiers killed

The siege of Lankaran (Persian: محاصره لنکران; Russian: Штурм Ленкорани) took place from 7 January to 13 January 1813 during the Russo-Persian War (1804–1813). Lankaran, a city in the Talish region, was previously held by Mir-Mostafa Khan of the Talysh Khanate, a subject of Iran. However, due to his defiance, he was ousted from the city by Iranian forces in August 1812. Now directly held by the Iranians, the city was soon besieged by the Russian commander Pyotr Kotlyarevsky, who had recently defeated the Iranian crown-prince Abbas Mirza at the battle of Aslanduz.

Shortly before the siege, Kotlyarevsky had offered the 4,000 stationed soldiers and their commander Sadeq Khan Qajar the chance to surrender, but they refused. Kotlyarevsky subsequently started the shelling of the city, and by 13 January, the Russians had captured Lankaran. The majority of the defenders, as well as Sadeq Khan, were killed, whilst Kotlyarevsky was wounded. Mir-Mostafa Khan was subsequently reinstated, and thus the Talysh Khanate was once again under Russian suzerainty.

The war effectively came to an end after the siege of Lankaran, as Iran was soon compelled to accept an unfavourable peace as Britain (who funded their war campaign) decided it was no longer worth continuing the conflict. On 24 October 1813, Iran and Russia signed the Treaty of Gulistan, in which Iran agreed to cede the majority of their holdings in the eastern Caucasus to Russia, including the northern part of Talish.

== Background ==
Lankaran is a city located in the northern part of the historical Talish region. Following the death of the Iranian monarch Nader Shah (r. 1736–1747) in 1747, it was made the capital of the newly established Talysh Khanate. Like other khanates in the Caucasus, it was still seen as an Iranian dependency even when the shahs (kings) in mainland Iran lacked the power to enforce their rule in the area. Since the 1760s, the Russians had shown interest in the Caucasus, growing more determined to increase their involvement and influence there. The Russo-Iranian War of 1804–1813 erupted when the Russians seized the city of Ganja, which had been governed by the Ganja Khanate.

The khan of the Talysh Khanate, Mir-Mostafa Khan kept shifting his allegiance between Iran and Russia, which both the Iranian monarch Fath-Ali Shah Qajar (r. 1797–1834) and his designated heir Abbas Mirza had grown tired of. After trying unsuccessfully to make Mir-Mostafa Khan side with Iran again, they decided to put an end to his authority in Lankaran. A unified Iranian force from several places and directions assaulted Lankaran in August 1812, routing Mir-Mostafa Khan's forces and the Russians who helped him. Mir-Mostafa Khan was able to flee to Gamishvan.

Abbas Mirza had ignored British officers' requests to set up guards at Aslanduz in order to deter Russian assaults. As a result, Russian commander Pyotr Kotlyarevsky led two successful ambushes against the Iranians, causing significant damage and stealing most of Abbas Mirza's artillery. Due to Abbas Mirza's withdrawal towards Tabriz following the battle of Aslanduz, Kotlyarevsky had time to attack Lankaran.

== The siege ==
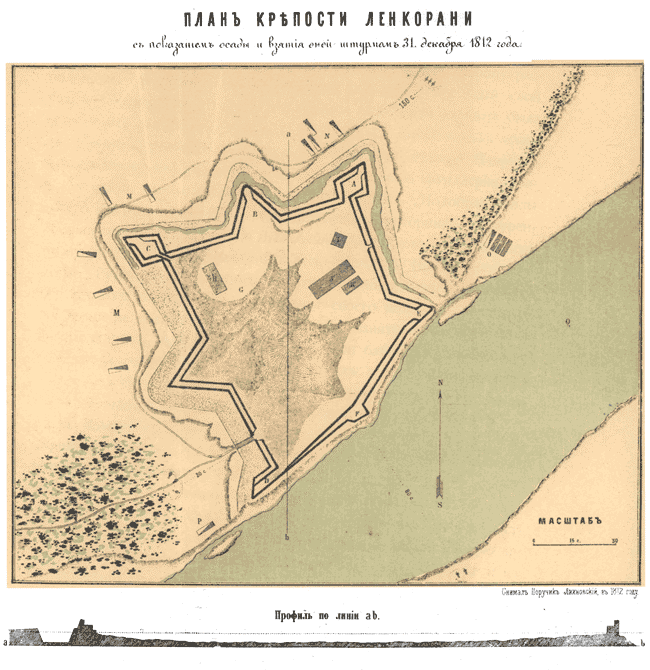
Russian plan of the Lankaran fortress

On January 7, Kotlyarevsky besieged Lankaran, which was being defended by 4,000 soldiers led by Sadeq Khan Qajar. Kotlyarevsky contacted Sadeq Khan the following day and demanded that he give over the fort. He went on to say that the Russians had defeated Abbas Mirza at Aslanduz and that Fath-Ali Shah (whom he addressed him as Baba Khan instead), (Note: The Russians did not recognize Fath-Ali Shah as shah, and thus called him by his former name, Baba Khan, until 1813.) was powerless to oppose the Russians. Sadeq Khan was unwilling to give up because Abbas Mirza had instructed him to hold the fort until the very last man. As a result, Kotlyarevsky subsequently gave the order for the ships to launch mortars towards the city. On January 10, the defenders were contacted by Kotlyarevsky, who urged them to surrender to save themselves, their wives and children, and their possessions. He reiterated Abbas Mirza's defeat and also the destruction of the Arkevan fortress.

On January 12, Kotlyarevsky gave the defenders three hours to submit quietly. Having run out of shells, he next gave the order for the troops to charge the city. He had the majority of his troops organized into three columns, but had his artillery surrounded by two companies from the Georgian Grenadier Regiment to give impression that he intended to launch the main assault from that place. The first column was led by Lieutenant-colonel Ushakov and included six companies from the Georgian Grenadier Regiment; the second column by Major Povalishin and included 297 members of the Caspian Naval Battalion and two companies from the Troitskii Regiment; and the third column by Major Tereshkevich and included 350 members of the Georgian Grenadier and 17th Jäger Regiments. 1,661 soldiers, 59 officers, and 37 military bands made up the entire contingent.

A quick ascent of the fort's walls was ordered for the columns at five in the morning, along with a quiet advance and no firing. The Russians were fired upon by the defenders for the following three hours. Numerous officers, including Ushakov, died in the incident. When Kotlyarevsky learned that his Ushakov's troops had remained in the dugout surrounding the fort following his death, he assumed leadership over them. However, he was subsequently wounded three times—one in the cheek—and passed out whilst lying on the bodies of the dead soldiers. Major Abkhazov of the Georgian Grenadiers succeeded in scaling the wall, thus making the Iranian artillery shift their focus. The fort was eventually taken after the second and third columns scaled the walls.

During the siege, 3,737 Iranians lost their lives in addition to Sadeq Khan and ten other khans. On the Russian side 325 soldiers and 16 officers were killed, whilst 584 soldiers and 25 officers were wounded. Kotlyarevsky was found injured amid the corpses and received medical attention. The silver mace of Sadeq Khan, two banners, eight artillery pieces, an enormous amount of supplies and ammunition were all taken by the Russians.

== Aftermath ==
Mir-Mostafa Khan was reinstated following the Russian capture of Lankaran, and thus the Talysh Khanate was once again under Russian suzerainty. The war effectively came to an end with the events in Aslanduz and Lankaran. Border skirmishes persisted for a while in 1813, and by summer, the Iranians had rebuilt their army. They saw encouraging signals of Russian engagement in Europe and knew they could continue to depend on money sent by Britain. However, Iran was soon compelled to accept a unfavourable peace as Britain decided it was no longer worth continuing the conflict. On 24 October 1813, Iran and Russia signed the Treaty of Gulistan, in which Iran agreed to cede the majority of their holdings in the eastern Caucasus to Russia, including the northern part of Talish.

Fath-Ali Shah did not consider the end of the war with Russia to be the end of the conflict with Mir-Mostafa Khan. Now that Mir-Mostafa Khan was in land ruled by the Russians, Fath-Ali Shah was unable to punish him physically, and thus tried to find other means to do it. With southern Talish still in Iranian possession, Fath-Ali Shah split it among the local warlords to stop Mir-Mostafa Khan from taking control all of Talish. He provided them property and the hereditary title of "khan". He also took advantage of their hatred for Mir-Mostafa Khan, encouraging them to be free from his rule. During the later Russo-Iranian War of 1826–1828, Mir-Mostafa Khan's son and successor Mir-Hasan Khan supported Iran.

== Sources ==
- Behrooz, Maziar (2023). Iran at War: Interactions with the Modern World and the Struggle with Imperial Russia. I.B. Tauris. ISBN 978-0755637379.
- Bournoutian, George (2016a). The 1820 Russian Survey of the Khanate of Shirvan: A Primary Source on the Demography and Economy of an Iranian Province prior to its Annexation by Russia. Gibb Memorial Trust. ISBN 978-1909724808.
- Bournoutian, George (2016b). "Prelude to War: The Russian Siege and Storming of the Fortress of Ganjeh, 1803–4". Iranian Studies. 50 (1). Taylor & Francis: 107–124. doi:10.1080/00210862.2016.1159779.
- Bournoutian, George (2021). From the Kur to the Aras: A Military History of Russia's Move into the South Caucasus and the First Russo-Iranian War, 1801–1813. Brill. ISBN 978-9004445154.
- Daniel, Elton L. (2001). "Golestān Treaty". In Yarshater, Ehsan (ed.). Encyclopædia Iranica. Vol. XI/1: Giōni–Golšani. London and New York: Routledge & Kegan Paul. pp. 86–90. ISBN 978-0-933273-60-3.
- Hambly, Gavin R. G. (1991). "Iran during the reigns of Fath 'Alī Shāh and Muhammad Shāh". In Avery, Peter; Hambly, Gavin R. G.; Melville, Charles Peter (eds.). The Cambridge History of Iran: From Nadir Shah to the Islamic Republic. Vol. 7. Cambridge: Cambridge University Press. pp. 144–173. ISBN 0-521-20095-4.
- Pourjavady, Reza (2023). "Russo-Iranian wars 1804-13 and 1826-8". Christian-Muslim Relations. A Bibliographical History Volume 20. Iran, Afghanistan and the Caucasus (1800-1914). Brill.
- Shahvar, Soli [in Persian]; Abramoff, Emil (2018). "The Khan, the Shah and the Tsar: The Khanate of Talesh between Iran and Russia". In Matthee, Rudi; Andreeva, Elena (eds.). Russians in Iran: Diplomacy and Power in the Qajar Era and Beyond. London: I.B. Tauris. pp. 24–48. ISBN 978-1-78673-336-8.
- Tapper, Richard (1997). Frontier Nomads of Iran: A Political and Social History of the Shahsevan. Cambridge University Press. ISBN 978-0-52158-336-7.
