= Soleyman Khan Qajar =

Iranian military commander (d. 1806)

Soleyman Khan Qajar (Persian: سلیمان خان قاجار; died 1806) was a military commander under his maternal cousin Agha Mohammad Khan Qajar, the founder of the Qajar dynasty of Iran. In 1799, Soleyman Khan and Mirza Bozorg Qa'em-Maqam were appointed as the adjutants of Crown Prince Abbas Mirza. Soleyman Khan remained with him until his death in 1806.

== Sources ==
- Behrooz, Maziar (2023). Iran at War: Interactions with the Modern World and the Struggle with Imperial Russia. I.B. Tauris. ISBN 978-0-7556-3737-9.
- Bournoutian, George (2021). From the Kur to the Aras: A Military History of Russia's Move into the South Caucasus and the First Russo-Iranian War, 1801–1813. Brill. ISBN 978-90-04-44515-4.
- Busse, H. (1982). "ʿAbbās Mīrzā Qajar". In Yarshater, Ehsan (ed.). Encyclopædia Iranica. Vol. I/1: Āb–ʿAbd-al-Hamīd. London and New York: Routledge & Kegan Paul. pp. 79–84. ISBN 978-0-71009-090-4.
- Davud, Seyyed Ali Al-i (2021). "Ibrāhīm Khalīl Khān Jawānshī". In Fleet, Kate; Krämer, Gudrun; Matringe, Denis; Nawas, John; Rowson, Everett (eds.). Encyclopaedia of Islam (3rd ed.). Brill Online. doi:10.1163/1573-3912_ei3_COM_30552. ISSN 1873-9830.
- Werner, Christoph (2012). "ʿAbbās Mīrzā". In Fleet, Kate; Krämer, Gudrun; Matringe, Denis; Nawas, John; Rowson, Everett (eds.). Encyclopaedia of Islam (3rd ed.). Brill Online. ISSN 1873-9830.
