= Göyşaban =

- Municipality
- Location within Azerbaijan
- Coordinates: 38°48′36″N 48°49′27″E
- Country: Azerbaijan
- Rayon: Lankaran

Population
  - Total: 3,038
- Time zone: UTC+4 (AZT)
  - Summer (DST): UTC+5 (AZT)

Göyşaban (also, Ol’khovka) is a village and municipality in the Lankaran Rayon of Azerbaijan. It has a population of 3,038.

== History ==
The history of the village dates back to ancient times. In the 1700s, the village consisted entirely of swamps. According to some reports, Azerbaijanis from Iran and Turks fleeing the Ottoman Russian War began to settle in the Lankaran lowlands. One of the settlements was this village. The swamps were drained and people began to settle in the swamps. Until 1992, it was known as Olkhovka. On April 29, 1992, Olkhovka was renamed Goyshaban.

== Geographical position ==
Goyshaban village is located in the Lankaran lowland, on the shores of the Caspian Sea. Before the opening of the Baku-Lankaran Silk Road, the main highway passed through this village, so the village has developed a lot.

== Tourism ==
Due to the fact that the village is located on the coast, in some places there are beach and fishing tourism. "Mandarin Hotel" was opened in the village in 2016. The famous "Simovar" statue in Azerbaijan is located in this village

== Highlights ==
Until 2018, the only main road from Lankaran to Baku passed through here. then new and more convenient ways were opened
