= Abbas Mirza =

Abbas Mirza عباس میرزا
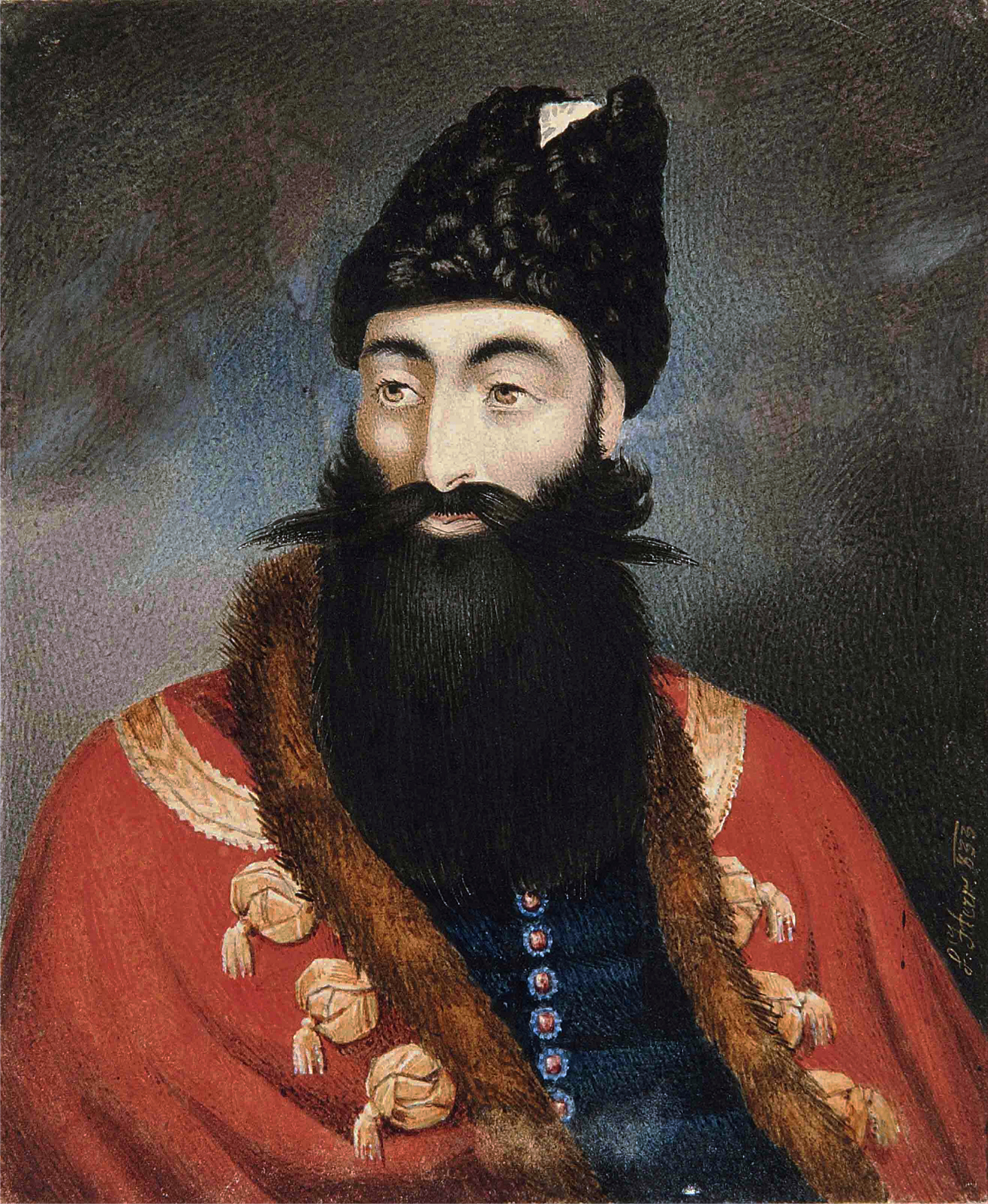
- Portrait of Abbas Mirza, 1833

Crown prince of Iran
- Tenure: 20 March 1799 – 25 October 1833
- Predecessor: Fath-Ali Shah Qajar
- Successor: Mohammad Shah Qajar
- Born: 26 August 1789; Nava, Mazandaran, Qajar Iran
- Died: 25 October 1833 (aged 44); Mashhad, Khorasan, Qajar Iran
- Burial: Imam Reza Shrine
- Spouse: Galin Khanum
- Issue: Many, among them: Mohammad Shah Qajar; Khanlar Mirza; Bahram Mirza; Bahman Mirza; Farhad Mirza; Firuz Mirza; Qahraman Mirza
- Dynasty: Qajar
- Father: Fath-Ali Shah Qajar
- Mother: Asiya Khanom Devellu
- Religion: Twelver Shia Islam
- Military career
- Service years: 1804–1833
- Rank: Commander in Chief
- Conflicts: Treelike list: Russo-Persian Wars; Russo-Persian War (1804–1813); Battle of Aslanduz; Siege of Erivan (1804); Siege of Erivan (1808); Karyagin's Raid; Battle of Echmiadzin (1804); Battle of Sultanabad; Russo-Persian War (1826–1828); Capture of Erivan; Capture of Abbasabad; Battle of Ganja (1826); Ottoman–Iranian Wars; Ottoman–Iranian War (1821–1823); Battle of Tupraq Qaleh; Battle of Erzurum (1821)

Abbas Mirza (Persian: عباس میرزا; 26 August 1789 – 25 October 1833) was the Qajar crown prince of Iran during the reign of his father Fath-Ali Shah Qajar (r. 1797–1834). As governor of the vulnerable Azerbaijan province, he played a crucial part in the two wars against the Russian Empire (1804–1813 and 1826–1828), as well as the war of 1821–1823 against the Ottoman Empire. He is also recognized for leading Iran's first reform and modernization attempts with the help of his ministers Mirza Bozorg Qa'em-Maqam and Abol-Qasem Qa'em-Maqam.

The conflict in the Azerbaijan and Caucasus regions between Iran and the Russian Empire was prevalent throughout the time that Abbas Mirza was growing up. On 20 March 1799, he was made the crown prince and given the title of Nayeb al-Saltaneh (viceregent). Around the same time, he was appointed the governor of Azerbaijan, with Soleyman Khan Qajar and Mirza Bozorg Qa'em-Maqam as his adjutants. Following Russia's takeover of Ganja in 1804, Abbas Mirza was in command of the Iranian military counterattack during the first and second Russo-Iranian wars. Throughout the two wars, he fought against numerous Russian commanders in various engagements, victorious and unsuccessful alike. The Iranians ultimately lost both wars, agreeing to sign the treaties of Gulistan and Turkmenchay, in which they ceded all of their holdings in the Caucasus, corresponding to present-day Armenia, Republic of Azerbaijan, and Dagestan.

In 1821, during the interlude between the first and second Russo-Iranian wars, increased Iranian-Ottoman tensions led to a new war. Abbas Mirza and his elder brother and rival Mohammad-Ali Mirza Dowlatshah made a joint assault on the Ottoman Empire, the latter penetrating into Ottoman Iraq as far as the walls of Baghdad. Peace was made in 1823, in which both parties signed the Treaty of Erzurum that recognized the previous borders established by the Treaty of Zuhab in 1639.

In an effort to make up for his losses by winning over less powerful foes and bolster his claim to the throne, Abbas Mirza invaded the areas east and northeast of Mashhad in the summer and fall of 1832, taking control of Khabushan, Sarakhs, and Torbat-e Heydarieh. Under continuous medical care by both Western and Iranian physicians, Abbas Mirza ultimately died of illness on 25 October 1833 in Mashhad. Fath-Ali Shah died the following year, being succeeded by Abbas Mirza's son Mohammad Mirza, who assumed the regnal name of Mohammad Shah Qajar (r. 1834–1848).

== Biography ==
=== Background and early life ===
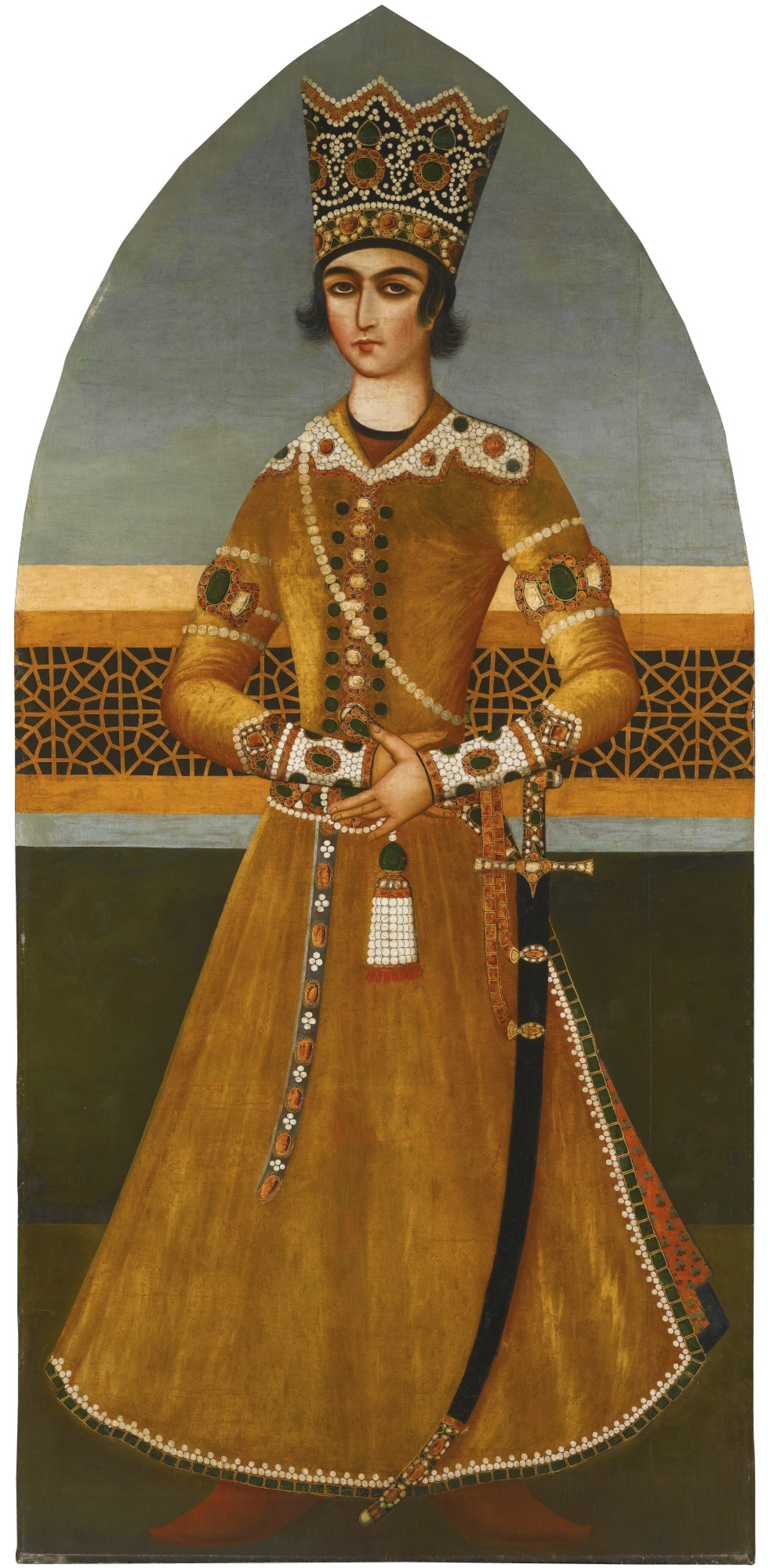
Portrait of Abbas Mirza, attributable to Mihr 'Ali, dated c. 1800

Abbas Mirza was born on 26 August 1789 in the village of Nava in Mazandaran, northern Iran. He was the fourth son of Fath-Ali Shah Qajar (r. 1797–1834), the second Qajar shah (king) of Iran and part of the Qovanlu branch of the Qajar tribe. His mother was Asiya Khanom Devellu, a daughter of Fath-Ali Khan Davalu and part of the Davalu branch of the Qajars. This union was arranged by Abbas Mirza's grand-uncle Agha Mohammad Khan Qajar (r. 1789–1797) in an effort to unite the Qovanlu and Davalu.

Thus, the line of Abbas Mirza and his offspring served as the foundation for all of Agha Mohammad Khan's expectations for the continuation of his dynasty. During Fath-Ali Shah's rule in Iran, a European traveler heard a rumor that Agha Mohammad Khan would have chosen Abbas Mirza instead of Fath-Ali Shah as shah if he had lived longer. Fath-Ali Shah's eldest son, Mohammad-Ali Mirza Dowlatshah, whose mother was a Georgian concubine, was excluded from the succession due to this obsession with settling tribal disputes amongst the Qajars. A fierce hostility would grow between Abbas Mirza and Dowlatshah, something some people speculated that Fath-Ali Shah welcomed. Besides Dowlatshah, intense competition would emerge with other brothers; Mohammad Vali Mirza, a ferocious and uncontrollable person who would hold the governorship of Khorasan and then Yazd, and Hossein Ali Mirza, a persistent schemer would hold the governorship of Fars. Like Fath-Ali Shah had been given the royal title of Jahanbani by Agha Mohammad Khan, he also gave his own sons and daughters a royal title. The title of dorr-e darya-e khosravy ("The Pearl of the Sea of Royalty") was given to Abbas Mirza.

The conflict in the Azerbaijan and Caucasus regions between Iran and the Russian Empire was prevalent throughout the time that Abbas Mirza was growing up. In 1797, at the age of eight, he was taken by Agha Mohammad Khan on a campaign against the Karabakh Khanate. He and the other princes stayed at Adina Bazar near Ardabil, and after Agha Mohammad Khan's murder that June, he was taken back to the capital of Tehran. The death of Agha Mohammad Khan gave rise to a number of pretenders to the throne.

=== Appointment as crown prince and governor of Azerbaijan ===
After making sure that his competitors did not constitute a threat, Fath-Ali Shah ascended to the kingdom on Nowruz (Iranian new year) on 21 March 1798. On 20 March 1799, he chose Abbas Mirza as the crown prince and gave him the title of Nayeb al-Saltaneh (viceregent). Iranian sources report that the title was in line with Agha Mohammad Khan's wishes. Abbas Mirza was given Soleyman Khan Qajar and Mirza Bozorg Qa'em-Maqam as his adjutants. Mirza Bozorg, one of the most skilled statesmen of the early Qajar era, served as the tutor and minister of Abbas Mirza.

Around the same time, Abbas Mirza was appointed the governor of the vulnerable province Azerbaijan with Tabriz as his regional capital. As the most rich and populous city in the realm, it would rise to prominence as the hub of a thriving trade with Europe for the remainder of the 18th century. In order to balance out Azerbaijan's regional autonomy, there were numerous less important seats in Kerman, Isfahan, and Kurdistan as well as at least three more strong princely seats in the south, west, and east. Hossein Ali Mirza was given the governorship of Fars and the Persian Gulf provinces, where he preserved autonomy. In an identical fashion, Dowlatshah was given a sizable domain in western Iran. The princes were pushed to demonstrate their value by expanding their territories along Iran's borders in addition to restoring the economy and establishing peace in their lands. Despite the fact that Abbas Mirza's brothers often settled down in the provincial capitals, he did not always reside in Tabriz.

After becoming governor, Abbas Mirza was sent to defeat the Kurdish chieftain Jafar Qoli Khan Donboli, who was making a claim to Azerbaijan's territory. But it was Soleyman Khan who was given actual leadership of the campaign. After winning a battle near Salmas, Abbas Mirza marched to Khoy before heading back to Tabriz.

=== First war with Russia ===
Political map of the eastern part of the Southern Caucasus between 1795 and 1801

The reign of the Russian tsar (emperor) Alexander I (r. 1801–1825) saw an increased desire on the part of the Russians to increase their presence and influence in the Caucasus, where they had already shown interest since the 1760s. Prince Pavel Tsitsianov, who Alexander I appointed to oversee Caucasian affairs in 1803, had nothing against about using violence, but any infringement of Iran's control over the Caucasus was not something that the Qajar administration could just ignore. Since 1502, Iran had controlled the Caucasus and the Iranians saw it as a natural extension of their country. In mid-January 1804, Tsitsianov invaded Ganja and conquered its fortress; its governor, Javad Khan, was killed, and between 1,500 and 3,000 residents were slaughtered. Russian law replaced Islamic law, and the congregational mosque was transformed into a church. This marked the beginning of the first Russo-Iranian War. On May 23, 1804, Fath-Ali Shah ordered Russian forces to depart from Iranian territories in the Caucasus. Iran interpreted their unwillingness to comply with this as an act of war.

Fath-Ali Shah designated Abbas Mirza as the leader of the Iranian army against the Russians, and gave the order to mobilize a sizable force of 20,000 soldiers towards Erivan. Since Abbas Mirza was only fifteen at the time, his leadership would have been more symbolic than actual, yet he nonetheless actively took part in the war and displayed bravery as a military commander. Fath-Ali Shah also assigned experienced tutors and commanders to assist Abbas Mirza, which included figures such as Mirza Bozorg, Soleyman Khan, Ali Qoli Khan Shahsevan, Ali Qoli Khan Sartip Qajar, Pir Qoli Khan Qajar, Sadeq Khan Qajar, and Mehdi Qoli Khan Qajar.

Abbas Mirza's aid was eagerly solicited by both England and Napoleon, anxious to checkmate one another in the East, especially as Persia bordered a common rival, namely Imperial Russia. Preferring the friendship of France, Abbas Mirza continued the war against Russia's young General Kotlyarevsky, aged only twenty-nine but his new ally could give him very little assistance. The early stages of the war following Fath Ali Shah's orders to invade and regain Georgia and the northern parts of the contemporary Azerbaijani Republic ended up in years of relatively territorial stale warfare. However, as Prof. Alexander Mikaberidze notes, Abbas Mirza led the army in an overall disastrous campaign against the Russians, suffering defeats at Gyumri, Kalagiri, the Zagam River (1805), Karakapet (1806), Karababa (1808), Ganja (1809), Meghri, the Aras River, and Akhalkalaki (1810). The tide started to decisively turn as Russia was sending more and more advanced weaponry and increasing numbers of soldiers. Commanding the southernmost Russian divisions during the long war, Kotlyarevsky defeated the numerically superior Persian army in the Battle of Aslanduz (1812) and in early 1813 stormed and took Lankaran. The Russians were encamped on the opposite bank of River Aras when his two British advisers, Capt Christie and Lt Pottinger, told him to post sentry pickets in short order, but Mirza ignored the warnings. Christie and other British officers tried to rally an army retreating in panic; for days the Russians launched fierce assaults, but at last Christie fell, and Mirza ordered a full retreat. Complacency cost 10,000 Persian lives; Mirza believing wrongly in the weight of superior numbers. In spite of the absence of leadership, the Persians at Lenkoran held out for weeks until, breaking through, the Russians slaughtered the garrison of 4,000 officers and men.

In October 1813, with Abbas Mirza still commander-in-chief, Persia was compelled to make a severely disadvantageous peace known as the Treaty of Gulistan, irrevocably ceding swaths of its territory in the Caucasus, comprising present-day Georgia, Dagestan, and most of what most recently became the Republic of Azerbaijan. The only promise the Shah received in return was a lukewarm guarantee that Mirza would succeed to his throne, without let or hindrance. Persia's dire losses attracted the attention of the British Empire; following the reversal of initial successes, the Russians now posed a serious threat from the Caucasus.

=== War with the Ottoman Empire ===
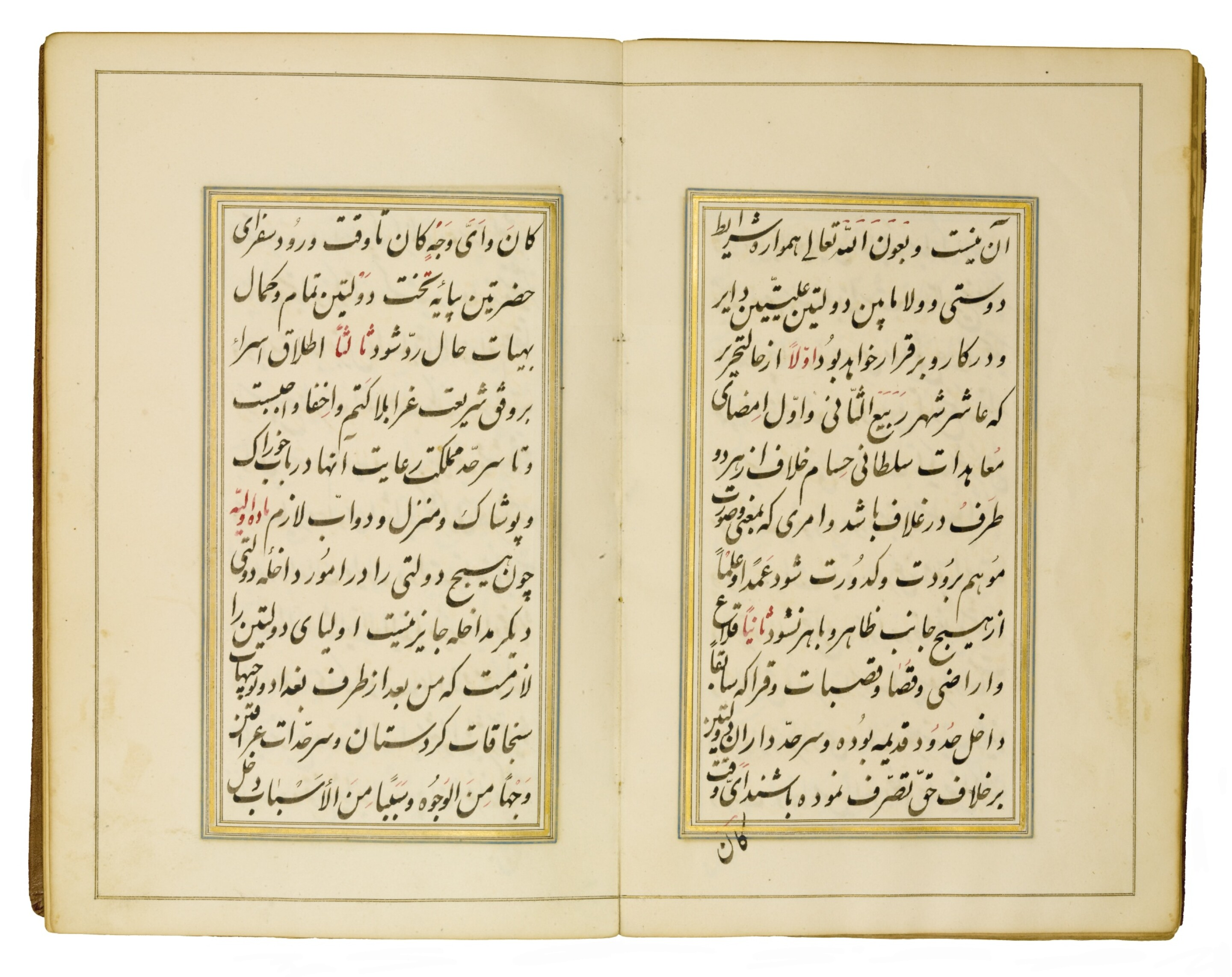
An official copy of the Treaty of Erzurum. Persian manuscript, created in Qajar Iran, 19th century

The conflict between Iranian and Ottoman border authorities was a major factor in the decline of Iranian-Ottoman relations between 1818 and 1820. Political issues in the Kurdish principality Baban renewed the animosity between Dowlatshah and the Ottoman governors of Baghdad, Sulaymaniyah, and Shahrizur in the central and southern sections of the Iranian-Ottoman frontier. The relation between Abbas Mirza and the Ottoman serasker of Erzurum was also made worse due to a dispute over the control of the nomadic tribes that inhabited the northern frontier. Abbas Mirza first opted for a diplomatic solution to the problems, and the British supported him in this decision. They made every effort to keep the Iranians and Ottomans from fighting each other, as it could weaken both sides and thus make it easier for the Russians to advance further south to India.

The Iranians and Ottomans were unable to find a solution, and following the eruption of the Greek war of independence against the Ottomans in 1821, Abbas Mirza offered Russia that they make a joint assault on the Ottoman Empire. He may have believed that a joint assault on the Ottoman Empire would deter Russia from considering additional attacks against Iran or at the very least further weaken the Russian military. His offer was declined by Russia, who nevertheless encouraged Iran to attack the Ottomans, even offering them financial help. The Russians may have hoped that a conflict between Iran and the Ottoman Empire would weaken them both, thus making it easier for them to advance further south.

In the same year, Dowlatshah invaded Ottoman Iraq, reaching as far as the walls of Baghdad. Dowlatshah was forced to leave due to a cholera epidemic, which he later contracted himself in November. While a second Iranian force conquered Bitlis and pushed towards Diyarbakr, Abbas Mirza distinguished himself by capturing Bayazit and Toprak Qala and marching on to Erzerum. In May 1822 at Khoy, Abbas Mirza successfully defeated the Ottoman counterattack, but by this point, cholera had also spread throughout his force, leading him to sue for peace. In contrast to earlier conflicts, no anti-Shia fatwas were ever declared by the Ottoman clergy to support the war. During peace negotiations, the Ottoman Shaykh al-Islam sent a letter to Abbas Mirza, in which he praised their friendship and referred Iran and the Ottoman Empire as "two great countries that are as one body."

=== Second war with Russia ===
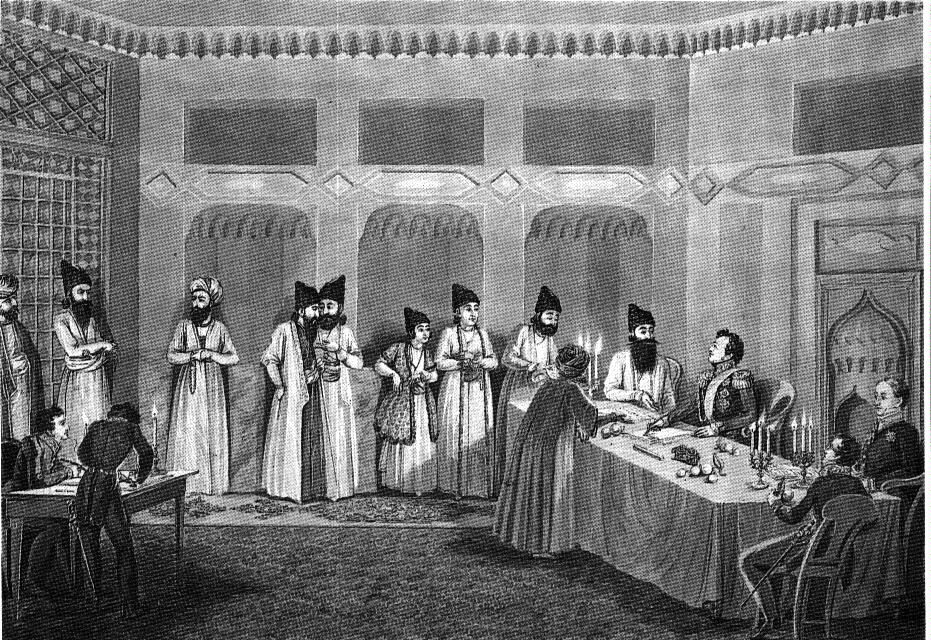
Abbas Mirza with Ivan Paskevich at the signing of the Treaty of Turkmenchay, 1828

His second war with Russia, which began in 1826, started off on a good note as he won back most of the territory lost in the Russo-Persian War (1804–1813); however it ended in a string of costly defeats after which Persia was forced to cede the last of its Caucasian territories, comprising all of what is modern day Armenia, Nakhchivan, the rest of the remainder of the contemporary Azerbaijani Republic that was still in Iranian hands, and Iğdır Province, all conform the 1828 Treaty of Turkmenchay. The eventual loss was due less to his army's skill and more to do with lack of reinforcements and overwhelming superiority in numbers. The irrevocable losses, which in total amounted up for all of Qajar Iran's territories in the North Caucasus and the South Caucasus, affected Abbas Mirza severely and his health began to suffer. He subsequently lost enthusiasm for further military reform.

In an effort to make up for his losses and bolster his claim to the throne, he invaded the areas east and northeast of Mashhad in the summer and fall of 1832, taking control of the Khabushan, Sarakhs, and Torbat-e Heydarieh. Under continuous medical care by both Western and Iranian physicians, Abbas Mirza ultimately died of illness on 25 October 1833 in Mashhad. Fath-Ali Shah died the following year, being succeeded by Abbas Mirza's son Mohammad Mirza, who assumed the regnal name of Mohammad Shah Qajar (r. 1834–1848).

== Military reforms ==
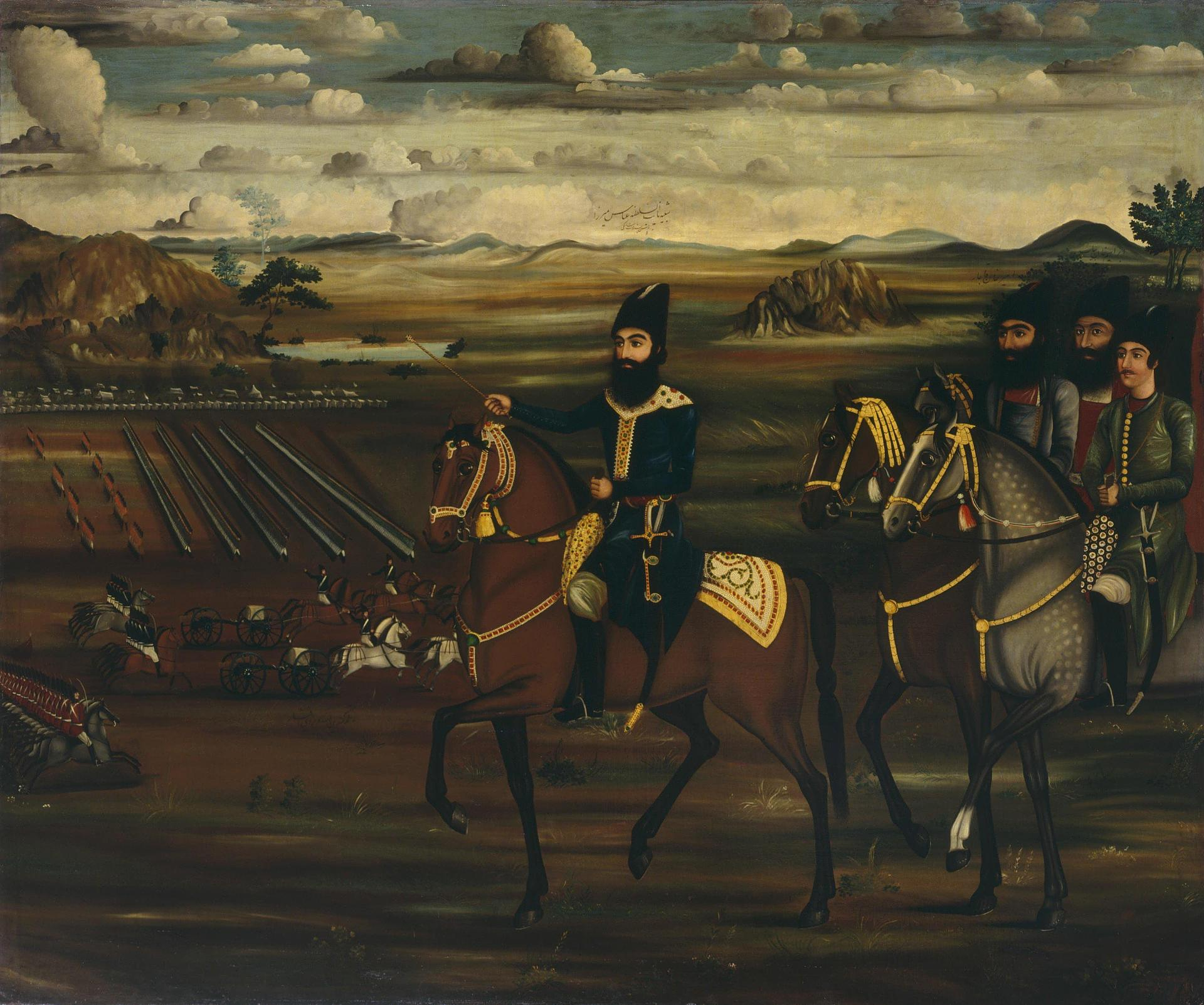
Illustration of Abbas Mirza reviewing his troops. Made by Allahverdi Afshar in 1815.

A reform of the Iranian army became necessary due to the conflict with the Russians, whose armies utilized modern technology and were structured according to modern ideas. Iran was in a situation resembling that of the Ottoman Empire in the early 18th century. Abbas Mirza wore a Mongolian mail coat from the royal treasures when he went to battle in 1804; this was likely done partially for symbolical purposes. Even then, he was aware that Russian strategies and equipment were superior to Iranian forces, therefore he started to instruct his soldiers in European practices. This marked the start of Abbas Mirza's Nezam-e Jadid ("The new [military] order"), a project to build an up-to-date army capable of fighting in a modern environment. Its name and military reforms resembled that of the Ottoman Nizam-i Cedid reforms made by the Ottoman Sultan Selim III (r. 1789–1807).

Abbas Mirza first employed Russian prisoners of war and deserters who provided practical instruction. Samson Makintsev, a commander in Abbas Mirza's army who rose to the rank of general, was the most well-known of these Russian troops. This approach of recruiting foreign instructors was strengthened when untrustworthy forces that had fought in France were sent to the Caucasian front during the War of the Sixth Coalition in Europe. In 1819, a regiment of 800 men was made up entirely of Russian deserters. French instructors began working at Tabriz in 1807, but after Iran severed ties with France, British officers made up the majority of the training staff. New ideas and administrative procedures were introduced with the Nezam reforms. Nezam troops started donning uniforms, initially in a color resembling Russian green and then French blue. Since the new uniform resembled non-Muslim clothing and went against Islamic clothing, the traditionalist clergy at first opposed it. However, the state leaders were able to convince them that it was required for the defense of Muslim areas. The title sarbaz ("one who is willing to sacrifice his head"), which is still used in the Iranian military today, was given to the soldiers.

Abbas Mirza's jealous brothers, especially Dowlatshah, as well as conservative court members criticized Abbas Mirza and Mirza Bozorg for their ideas of military reform being based on a European model. Accusations of professing Christianity was even made towards Mirza Bozorg, who was the main driving force behind the reforms. The army of Azerbaijan, which was the main force defending against the Russians, was under Abbas Mirza's command. As a result, it was better organized and more skilled than the rest of the imperial army. Abbas Mirza provided his soldiers with clothing and weapons. When James Justinian Morier visited in 1808/09, he estimated that Abbas Mirza's had 40,000 soldiers under his command; 22,000 cavalry, 12,000 infantry with an artillery force, and 6,000 Nezam infantry.

== Cultural activities ==
Mirza Bozorg probably had a significant impact on Abbas Mirza's formal education, which appears to have been carefully laid out. Abbas Mirza was familiar with Iranian historians' writings, the Shahnameh by Ferdowsi being his favorite book. Although Tabriz had its own court poets like Sabur of Kashan and Abol-Qasem Forugh, Abbas Mirza was not really interested in poetry. Numerous paintings, including portraits of Napoleon, the Russian emperor, and Sultan Selim III, were used to decorate the palaces in Tabriz and Ujan.

It is conceivable that Abbas Mirza read books written about Europe in Ottoman Turkish and/or Persian since he could not understand English or any other European language well enough to read in those languages. One of the most recent books about England—the one European nation that seems to have captured Abbas Mirza's attention the most—was the Safarnameh composed in 1820 by Mirza Saleh Shirazi. It was one of several Persian works on Europe and the West that were available at the time. Despite not understanding English, Abbas Mirza still owned a small collection of English-language literature, including the Encyclopaedia Britannica.

== Administrative, economic and building activities ==
Significant amounts of money were spent fighting the Russians. Abbas Mirza attempted to resolve his problems by creating a comprehensive budget register, as British subsidies were insufficient, and his request for funds from Tehran was turned down by Fath-Ali Shah, who considered the richness of Azerbaijan to be sufficient for Abbas Mirza. With a ruznama-nevis assigned to each town to relay information, the state's long-standing intelligence service was revived. It also became illegal for men to purchase their way into government employment. Due to a lack of authorities qualified to implement reforms, traditional methods remained in place in the financial sector and bureaucracy. However, with assistance from Europe, a few industrial measures (whose products were largely used to support the army) were able to get launched. Firearms, the search for copper reserves, a smelter close to Ahar, weaving mills, and other industrial facilities are a few examples.

The situation of the travelers was not greatly improved. On the Sayen pass, which connects Ardabil and Sarab, a caravanserai was built. Abbas Mirza's construction efforts were minimal. In Tabriz, a maidan (square) was built around the barracks, the latter which the Scottish army officer and diplomat John Macdonald Kinneir considered to be the sole attractive structure in the city. In 1818–1819, qanats were constructed outside the city, and a modest palace was being built.

== Personality and appearance ==
According to the Scottish traveller Robert Ker Porter, Abbas Mirza was "rather above the ordinary stature;" his eyes were "dark and expressive...; his nose aquiline; his beard full, and like his finely-formed eye-brows, of a jet-black."

== Legacy and assessment ==
Abbas Mirza is recognized for leading Iran's first reform and modernization attempts with the help of his ministers Mirza Bozorg and Abol-Qasem Qa'em-Maqam.

== In popular culture ==
- Tabriz in Fog: an Iranian historical drama about Abbas Mirza's life.

== Issue ==
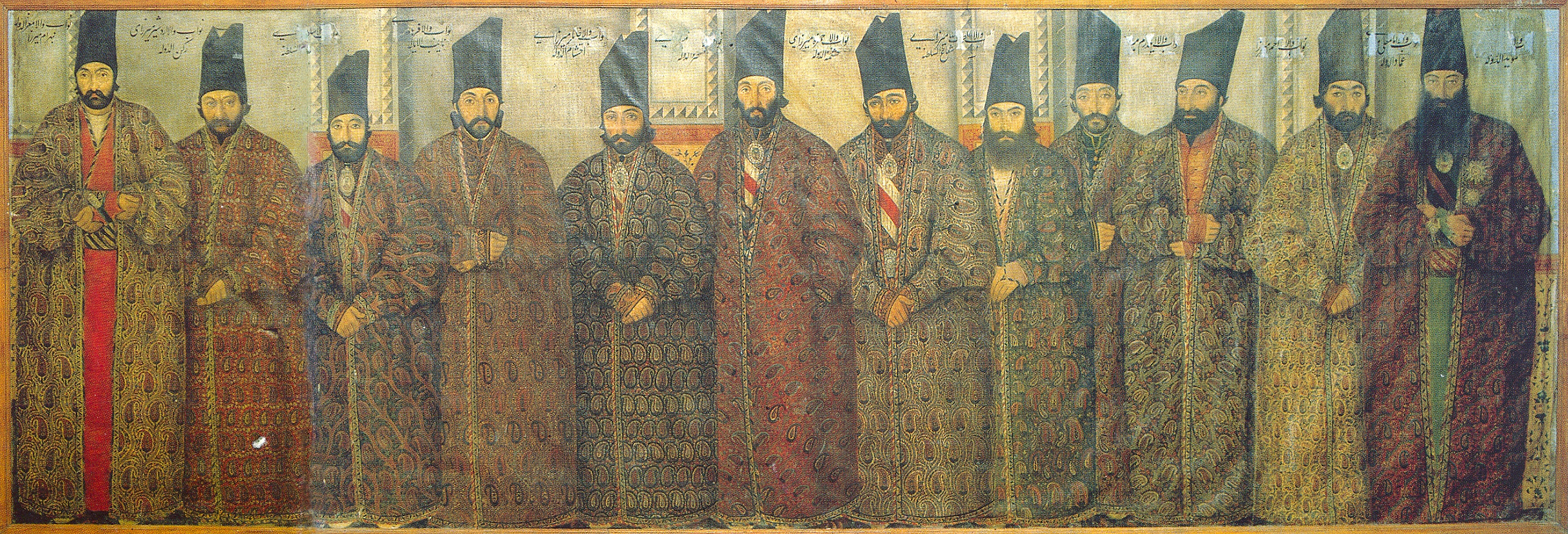
Abbas Mirza's sons, brothers and nephews

As was customary for Qajars, Abbas Mirza had many children; 26 sons and 21 daughters.

- Prince Mohammed Mirza, to become Mohammad Shah Qajar
- Prince Bahram Mirza Mo'ez ed-Dowleh
- Prince Jahangir Mirza
- Prince Bahman Mirza
- Prince Fereydun Mirza Nayeb-ol-Eyaleh
- Prince Eskandar Mirza
- Prince Khosrow Mirza
- Prince Qahraman Mirza
- Prince Ardeshir Mirza Rokn ed-Dowleh
- Prince Ahmad Mirza
- Prince Ja'far Gholi Mirza
- Prince Mostafa Gholi Mirza
- Prince Morad Mirza Hesam o-Saltaneh
- Prince Manouchehr Mirza
- Prince Farhad Mirza Mo'tamed ed-Dowleh
- Prince Firouz Mirza Nosrat ed-Dowleh
- Prince Khanlar Mirza Ehtesham ed-Dowleh
- Prince Bahador Mirza
- Prince Mohammad Rahim Mirza
- Prince Mehdi Gholi Mirza
- Prince Hamzeh Mirza Heshmat od-Dowleh
- Prince Ildirim Bayazid Mirza
- Prince Lotfollah Mirza Shoa'a ed-Dowleh
- Prince Mohammad Karim Mirza
- Prince Ja'ffar Mirza
- Prince Abdollah Mirza

== See also ==
- Set Khan Astvatsatourian
- Abbas Mirza Mosque, Yerevan
- Russo-Persian Wars
- Samson Makintsev
- Imperial Crown Jewels of Persia
- Military history of Iran

== Sources ==
- Atkin, Muriel (1980). Russia and Iran, 1780–1828. University of Minnesota Press. ISBN 978-0816609246.
- Aktin, Muriel (2018). "The Early Stages of Russo–Iranian Relations". In Matthee, Rudi; Andreeva, Elena (eds.). Russians in Iran: Diplomacy and Power in the Qajar Era and Beyond. I.B. Tauris. pp. 11–23. ISBN 978-1-78673-336-8.
- Amanat, Abbas (1999). "Fatḥ-ʿAlī Shah Qājār". In Yarshater, Ehsan (ed.). Encyclopædia Iranica. Vol. IX/4: Fārs II–Fauna III. London and New York: Routledge & Kegan Paul. pp. 407–421. ISBN 978-0-933273-32-0.
- Amanat, Abbas (2017). Iran: A Modern History. Yale University Press. ISBN 978-0-300-11254-2.
- Behrooz, Maziar (2023). Iran at War: Interactions with the Modern World and the Struggle with Imperial Russia. I.B. Tauris. ISBN 978-0-7556-3737-9.
- Bournoutian, George (1976). "Husayn Qulī Khān Qazvīnī, Sardār of Erevan: A Portrait of a Qajar Administrator". Iranian Studies. 9 (2/3). Cambridge University Press: 163–179. doi:10.1080/00210867608701513. JSTOR 4310229. (registration required)
- Bournoutian, George (1992). The Khanate of Erevan Under Qajar Rule: 1795–1828. Mazda Publishers. ISBN 978-0939214181.
- Bournoutian, George (2021). From the Kur to the Aras: A Military History of Russia's Move into the South Caucasus and the First Russo-Iranian War, 1801–1813. Brill. ISBN 978-90-04-44515-4.
- Busse, H. (1982). "ʿAbbās Mīrzā Qajar". In Yarshater, Ehsan (ed.). Encyclopædia Iranica. Vol. I/1: Āb–ʿAbd-al-Hamīd. London and New York: Routledge & Kegan Paul. pp. 79–84. ISBN 978-0-71009-090-4.
- Daniel, Elton L. (2001). "Golestān Treaty". In Yarshater, Ehsan (ed.). Encyclopædia Iranica. Vol. XI/1: Giōni–Golšani. London and New York: Routledge & Kegan Paul. pp. 86–90. ISBN 978-0-933273-60-3.
- Hambly, Gavin R. G. (1991). Avery, Peter; Hambly, Gavin R. G.; Melville, Charles Peter (eds.). The Cambridge History of Iran: From Nadir Shah to the Islamic Republic. Vol. 7. Cambridge: Cambridge University Press. pp. 104–173. ISBN 0-521-20095-4.
- Hoiberg, Dale H., ed. (2010). "'Abbās Mīrzā". Encyclopædia Britannica. Vol. I: A-Ak - Bayes (15th ed.). Chicago, IL: Encyclopædia Britannica, Inc. ISBN 978-1-59339-837-8.
- Javadi, H. (1983). "Abu'l-Ḥasan Khan Īḷčī". In Yarshater, Ehsan (ed.). Encyclopædia Iranica. Vol. I/3: Ablution, Islamic–Abū Manṣūr Heravı̄. London and New York: Routledge & Kegan Paul. pp. 308–310. ISBN 978-0-71009-092-8.
- Lahouti, Hassan (2015). "ʿAbbās Mīrzā". In Madelung, Wilferd; Daftary, Farhad (eds.). Encyclopaedia Islamica Online. Brill Online. ISSN 1875-9831.
- Mikaberidze, Alexander (2011). Conflict and Conquest in the Islamic World: A Historical Encyclopedia [2 volumes]: A Historical Encyclopedia. ABC-CLIO. ISBN 978-1-59884-337-8.
- Pourjavady, Reza (2023). "Russo-Iranian wars 1804-13 and 1826-8". Christian-Muslim Relations. A Bibliographical History Volume 20. Iran, Afghanistan and the Caucasus (1800-1914). Brill.
- Shahvar, Soli (2020a). "Domestic and external considerations in the struggle over regency in early Qajar Iran: The princely rivalry between ʿAbbas Mirza and Muhammad-ʿAli Mirza". Middle Eastern Studies. 56 (4): 549–569. doi:10.1080/00263206.2020.1751617. S2CID 219927274.
- Shahvar, Soli (2020b). "Abbas Mirza's Invitation to Europeans to Settle in Nineteenth-Century Iranian Azerbaijan: Reasons, Causes and Motives". Iran: Journal of the British Institute of Persian Studies. 60: 121–134. doi:10.1080/05786967.2020.1749009. S2CID 216249898.
- Szántó, Iván (2021). "Allāhvirdī Afshār". In Fleet, Kate; Krämer, Gudrun; Matringe, Denis; Nawas, John; Rowson, Everett (eds.). Encyclopaedia of Islam (3rd ed.). Brill Online. ISSN 1873-9830.
- Tapper, Richard (1997). Frontier Nomads of Iran: A Political and Social History of the Shahsevan. Cambridge University Press. ISBN 978-0-521-58336-7.
- Tucker, Ernest (2006). "Iraq v. Afsharids to the end of the Qajars". In Yarshater, Ehsan (ed.). Encyclopædia Iranica. Vol. XIII/6: Iraq V. Safavid period–Isfahan VIII. Qajar period. London and New York: Routledge & Kegan Paul. pp. 561–564. ISBN 978-0-933273-94-8.
- Werner, Christoph (2012). "ʿAbbās Mīrzā". In Fleet, Kate; Krämer, Gudrun; Matringe, Denis; Nawas, John; Rowson, Everett (eds.). Encyclopaedia of Islam (3rd ed.). Brill Online. ISSN 1873-9830.
