= Nezam-e Jadid =

19th century military reforms of Qajar prince Abbas Mirza

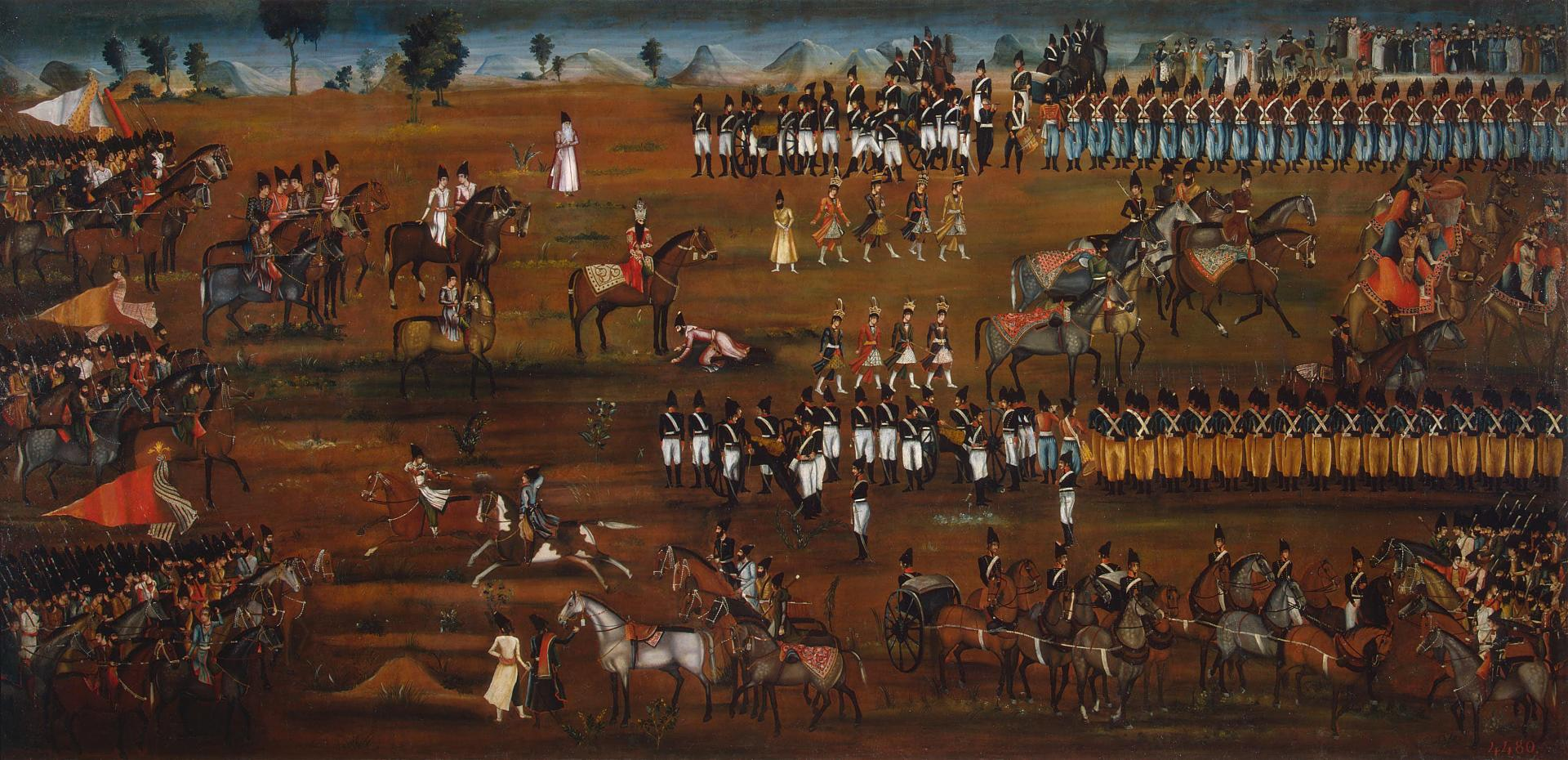
Oil painting illustrating a military review with Fath-Ali Shah and Abbas Mirza, dated 1815/16

Nezam-e Jadid (Persian: نظام جدید, lit. 'the new [military] order') was a project started by the Qajar crown prince Abbas Mirza to build an up-to-date Iranian army capable of fighting in a modern environment. Its name and military reforms resembled that of the Ottoman Nizam-i Cedid reforms made by the Ottoman Sultan Selim III (r. 1789–1807).

Abbas Mirza first employed Russian prisoners of war and deserters who provided practical instruction. Samson Makintsev, a commander in Abbas Mirza's army who rose to the rank of general, was the most well-known of these Russian troops. This approach of recruiting foreign instructors was strengthened when untrustworthy forces that had fought in France were sent to the Caucasian front during the War of the Sixth Coalition in Europe. In 1819, a regiment of 800 men was made up entirely of Russian deserters. French instructors began working at Tabriz in 1807, but after Iran severed ties with France, British officers made up the majority of the training staff.

New ideas and administrative procedures were introduced with the Nezam reforms. Nezam troops started donning uniforms, initially in a color resembling Russian green and then French blue. Since the new uniform resembled non-Muslim clothing and went against Islamic clothing, the traditionalist clergy at first opposed it. However, the state leaders were able to convince them that it was required for the defense of Muslim areas. The title sarbaz ("one who is willing to sacrifice his head"), which is still used in the Iranian military today, was given to the soldiers.

Abbas Mirza's jealous brothers, especially Mohammad Ali Mirza Dowlatshah, as well as conservative court members criticized Abbas Mirza and Mirza Bozorg Qa'em-Maqam for their ideas of military reform being based on a European model. Accusations of professing Christianity was even made towards Mirza Bozorg, who was the main driving force behind the reforms.

== Sources ==
- Amanat, Abbas (2017). Iran: A Modern History. Yale University Press. ISBN 978-0-300-11254-2.
- Behrooz, Maziar (2023). Iran at War: Interactions with the Modern World and the Struggle with Imperial Russia. I.B. Tauris. ISBN 978-0-7556-3737-9.
- Busse, H. (1982). "ʿAbbās Mīrzā Qajar". In Yarshater, Ehsan (ed.). Encyclopædia Iranica. Vol. I/1: Āb–ʿAbd-al-Hamīd. London and New York: Routledge & Kegan Paul. pp. 79–84. ISBN 978-0-71009-090-4.
