= Dohna (disambiguation) =

Dohna is a town in the Sächsische Schweiz-Osterzgebirge district, Saxony, Germany.

Dohna may also refer to:

== People ==
- Dohna-Schlobitten
- Alexander zu Dohna-Schlobitten (1661–1728), field marshal
- Alexander zu Dohna-Schlobitten (1899–1997), officer and businessman
- Christian Albert, Burgrave and Count of Dohna, general
- Christopher von Dohna (1583–1637), politician
- Christopher I, Burgrave and Count of Dohna-Schlodien (1665–1733), general and diplomat
- Christopher Delphicus zu Dohna (1628–1668), diplomat
- Frederick, Burgrave of Dohna (1621–1688), general and diplomat
- Friedrich Ferdinand Alexander zu Dohna-Schlobitten (1771–1831), Prussian politician
- Heinrich Graf zu Dohna-Schlobitten (1882–1944), general and resistance fighter
- Karl Friedrich Emil zu Dohna-Schlobitten (1784–1859), field marshal
- Nikolaus zu Dohna-Schlodien (1879–1956), naval officer and author
- Richard zu Dohna-Schlobitten (1843–1916), counsellor of Kaiser Wilhelm II

== Other ==
- Dohna Castle, Germany
- Dohna Feud, a historical dispute
