= Słobity Palace =

Ruined baroque palace in Poland

Słobity Castle
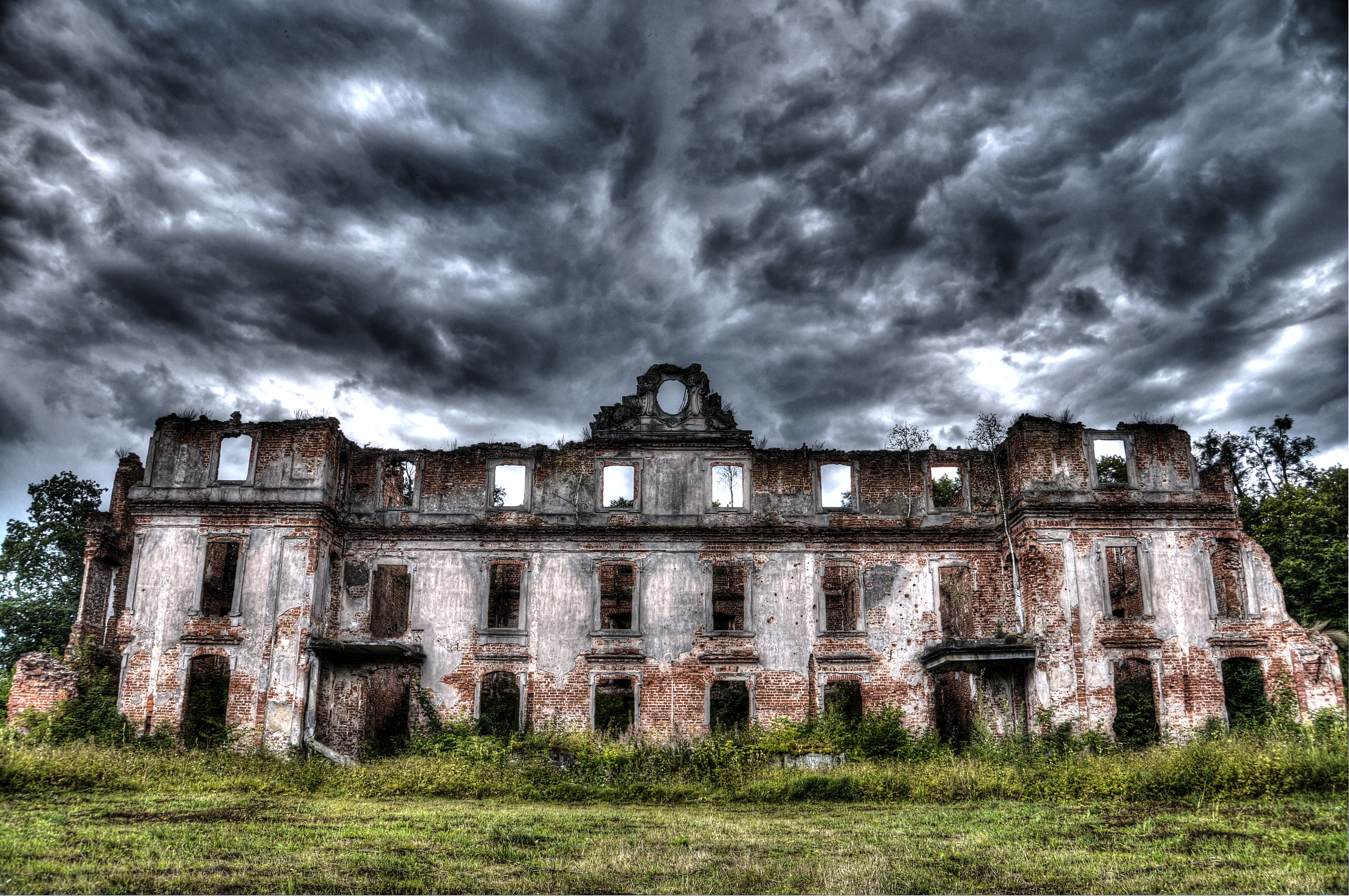
- Modern view of the palace ruins

- Location within Poland

General information
- Type: Palace
- Architectural style: Baroque
- Location: Słobity, Poland
- Coordinates: 54.140905°N 19.785946°E
- Construction started: 1622
- Completed: 1624

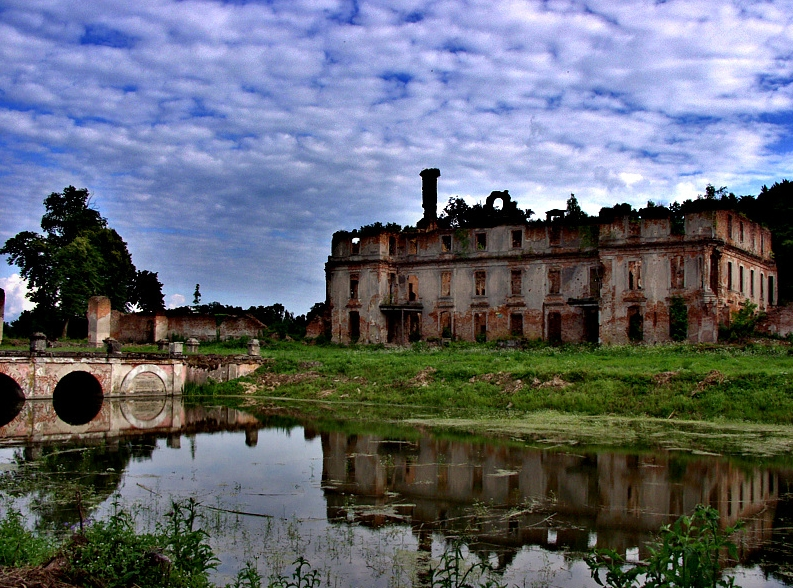
The ruins of Schloss Schlobitten today

Słobity Palace (Polish: Pałac w Słobitach; German: Schloss Schlobitten) is a ruined baroque palace in Słobity, in the Warmian-Masurian Voivodeship in Poland, constructed between 1622 and 1624.

It was the seat of the Schlobitten branch of the Dohna family. In 1945, it was looted and plundered by the Red Army, before it was set afire. Since then it has been a ruin.

Part of the inventory and collections was saved by prince Alexander zu Dohna-Schlobitten (1899–1997); he later transferred this to the Prussian Palaces and Gardens Foundation Berlin-Brandenburg in order to keep it together; it can be now admired as the Dohna-Schlobitten collection in Schloss Doberlug in Doberlug-Kirchhain, Germany.

The palace was one of the so-called 'royal palaces' of the former province of East Prussia, which could be used by the king of Prussia while travelling around. It was one of the best examples of Baroque architecture in East Prussia. Today, the palace is in poor condition and deteriorating. Also, the landscape park is totally neglected.

== History ==
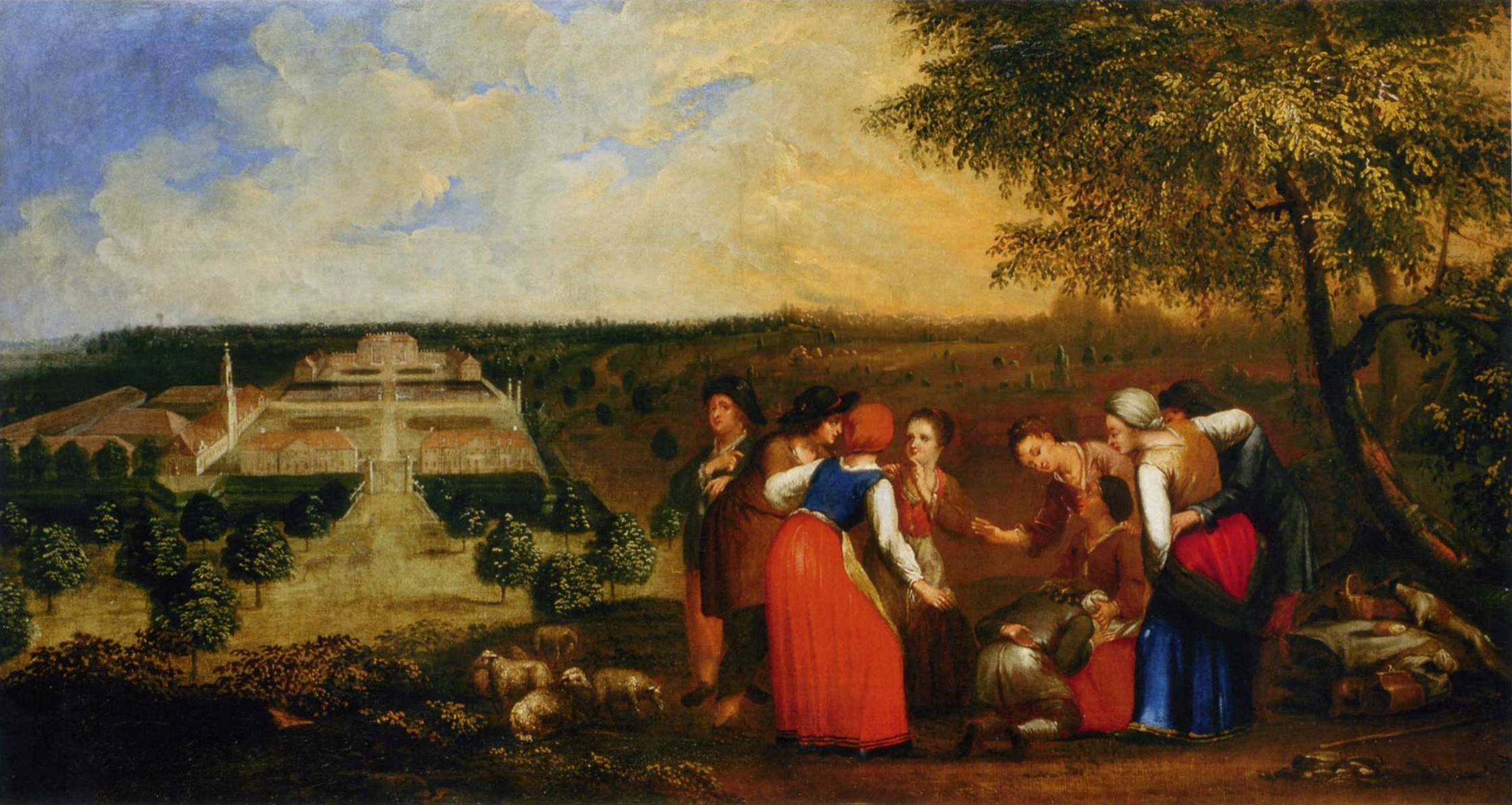
The palace around 1720

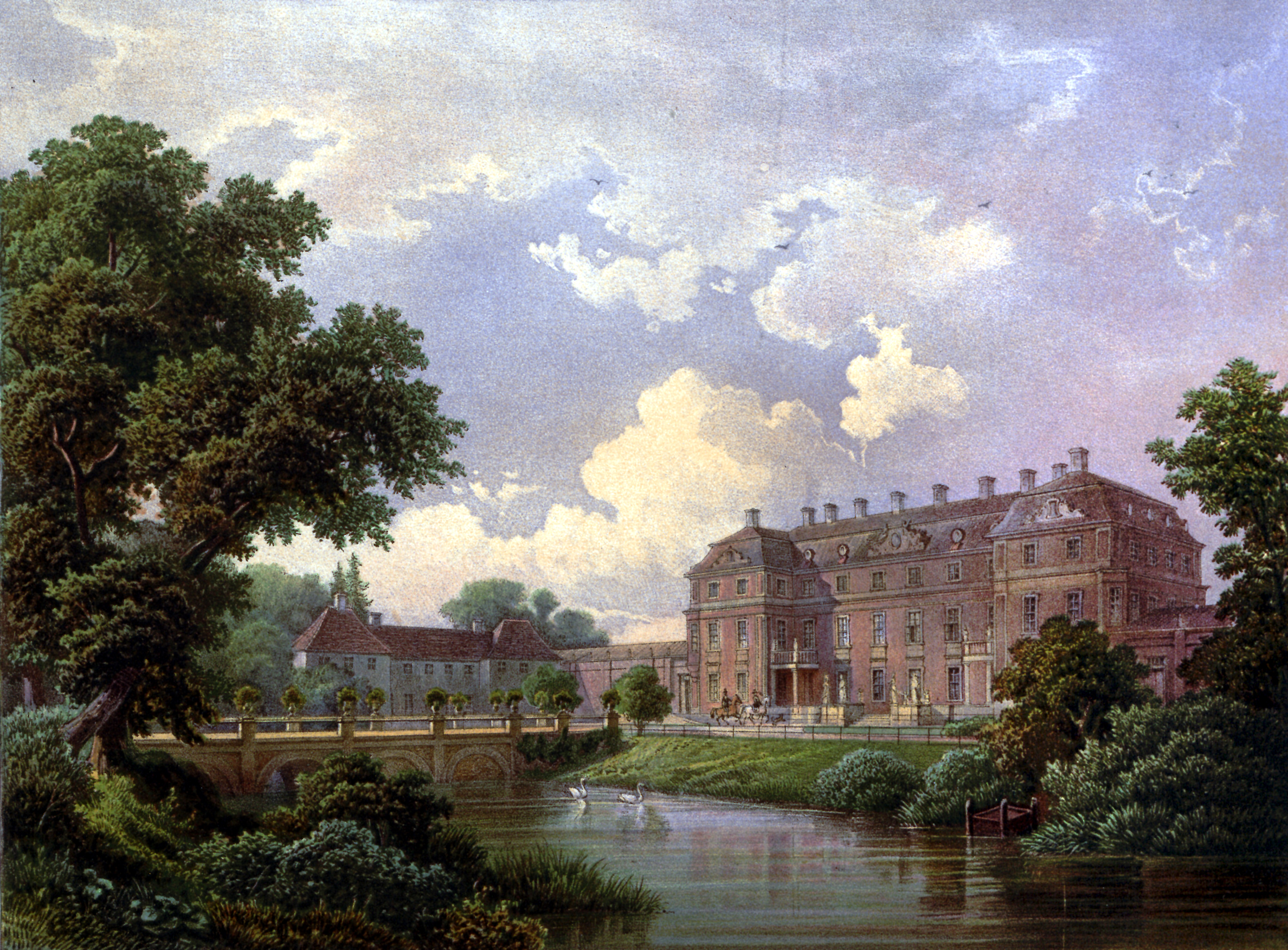
View of the palace by Alexander Duncker around 1860

=== 16th century: the Dohna family comes to Schlobitten ===
The Dohna family originated from Saxony and came to Prussia in the 15th century. In 1525, Albert, Duke of Prussia (1490–1568) rewarded Peter von Dohna (1483–1553) for his services with the estate and village of Schlobitten. Peter's son Aschatius von Dohna (1533–1601) relocated the family seat to Schlobitten and replaced an older manor house with a fortified house surrounded by moats, which he inhabited from 1589 onward.

Achatius' son Abraham (1579–1631) erected the first castle in the early Baroque style following Dutch models between 1622 and 1624, whose three-tiered curved ornamental gables echoed the Dutch baroque. The appearance of the castle is preserved through a drawing by the builder. Investigations by Polish experts indicate that Abraham's construction integrated cellar vaults of the previous building from the 16th century. During the Polish-Swedish War, the castle was ravaged by plunderers and only hastily restored by Abraham.

=== 17th century: the Connection to House of Orange and the Brederode family ===
After Abraham's death, while his widow inhabited parts of the estate for several years, his nephew and heir Friedrich von Dohna, former governor of the Principality of Orange in the service of the House of Orange, resided at Château de Coppet on Lake Geneva. The connection to the Oranges was through Friedrich's parents, Christoph zu Dohna and Ursula, née countess of Solms-Braunfels; the latter had two sisters: Amalia of Solms-Braunfels (1602–1675), who was married to the Dutch stadtholder Frederick Henry, Prince of Orange (1584–1647), and Louise Christina, who had married the Dutch army chief Johan Wolfert van Brederode (1599–1655), member of the Van Brederode family. Through this connection, there was also a relationship to Amalia's grandchildren, kings William III of England (1650–1702) and Frederick I of Prussia (1657–1713).

The Brederode family died out with the Johan Wolfert's son, Wolfert van Brederode (1649–1679). The Dohna family inherited the Vianen estate with Batestein Castle. Until 1945, the Dohna princes kept the heirlooms in a separate Brederode room in the palace.

=== 18th century ===
Frederick I, who founded the Kingdom of Prussia in 1701, wished for his new kingdom to be adorned with magnificent baroque palaces for reasons of cultural representation. Thus, almost simultaneously, the castles Schlodien (also owned by the Dohna family), Friedrichstein, and Dönhoffstädt (counts Dönhoff), Finckenstein (counts Finck von Finckenstein), and Capustigall (counts Waldburg) were built in competition with each other – the latter two would later also come into possession of the Dohna family. Of these residences, only Dönhoffstädt remains undestroyed today, and Schlodien has been fully reconstructed.

Frederick's son, count Alexander zu Dohna-Schlobitten (1661–1728) rebuilt the ruins of Schlobitten castle in the years 1696 to 1723 in the style of the high baroque according to designs by Jean Baptiste Broebes He expanded the manor house with a second gallery, and added two wings at right angles, so that the building enclosed a horseshoe-shaped courtyard. At the same time, his brother Christoph built the nearby castle in Schlodien. The further expansion from 1704 onwards was carried out under the direction of Johann Caspar Hindersin: The outer courtyard of the stable was surrounded by low connecting wings, a third floor and a mansard roof were added to the main building. Hindersin thus created "a highly original ensemble enclosing two square courtyards of great charm." The ballroom with its magnificent stucco was decorated by Joseph Anton Kraus in 1713.

=== 19th and 20th centuries ===
In the 19th century, the palace garden was transformed into a landscape park.

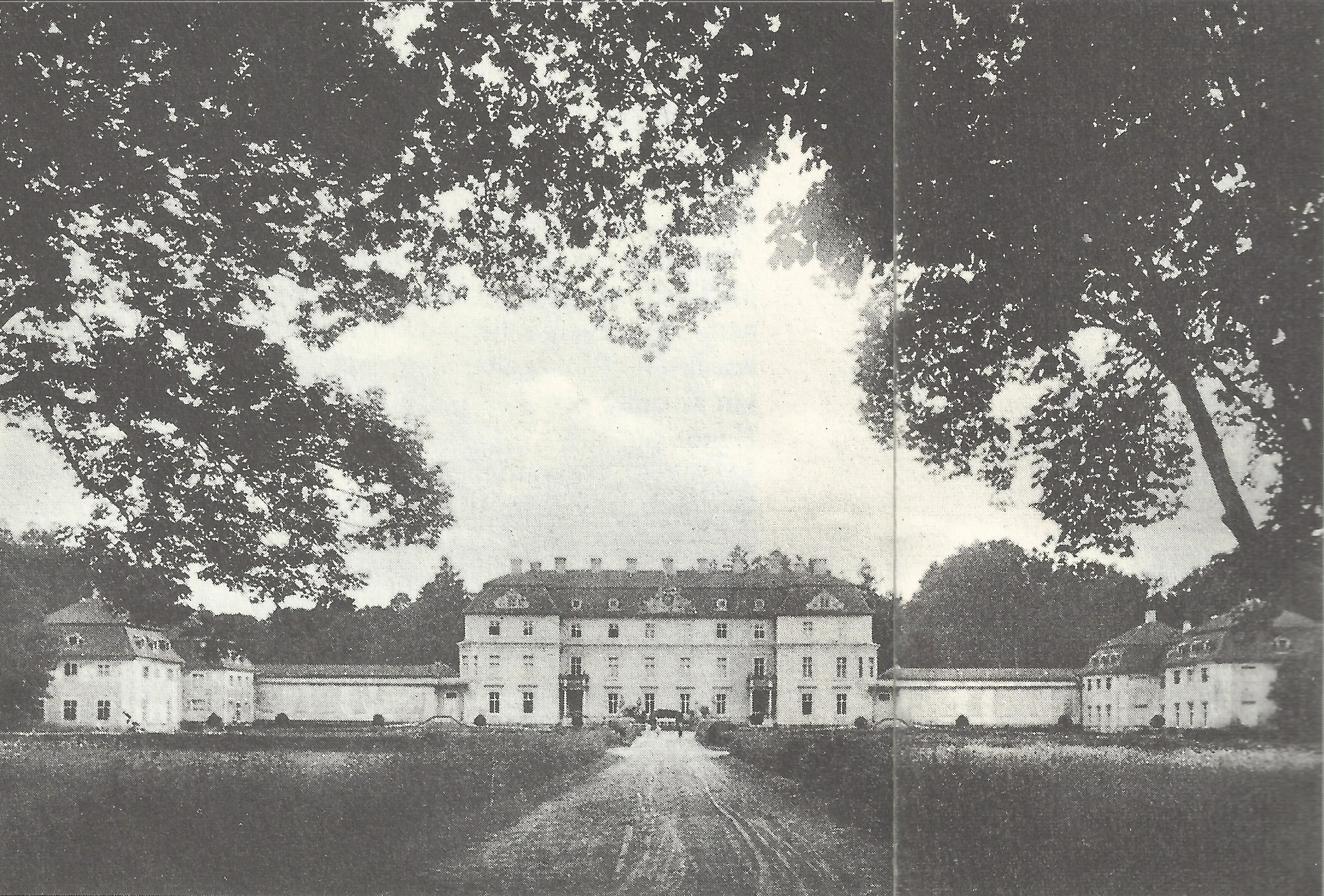
The palace around 1915

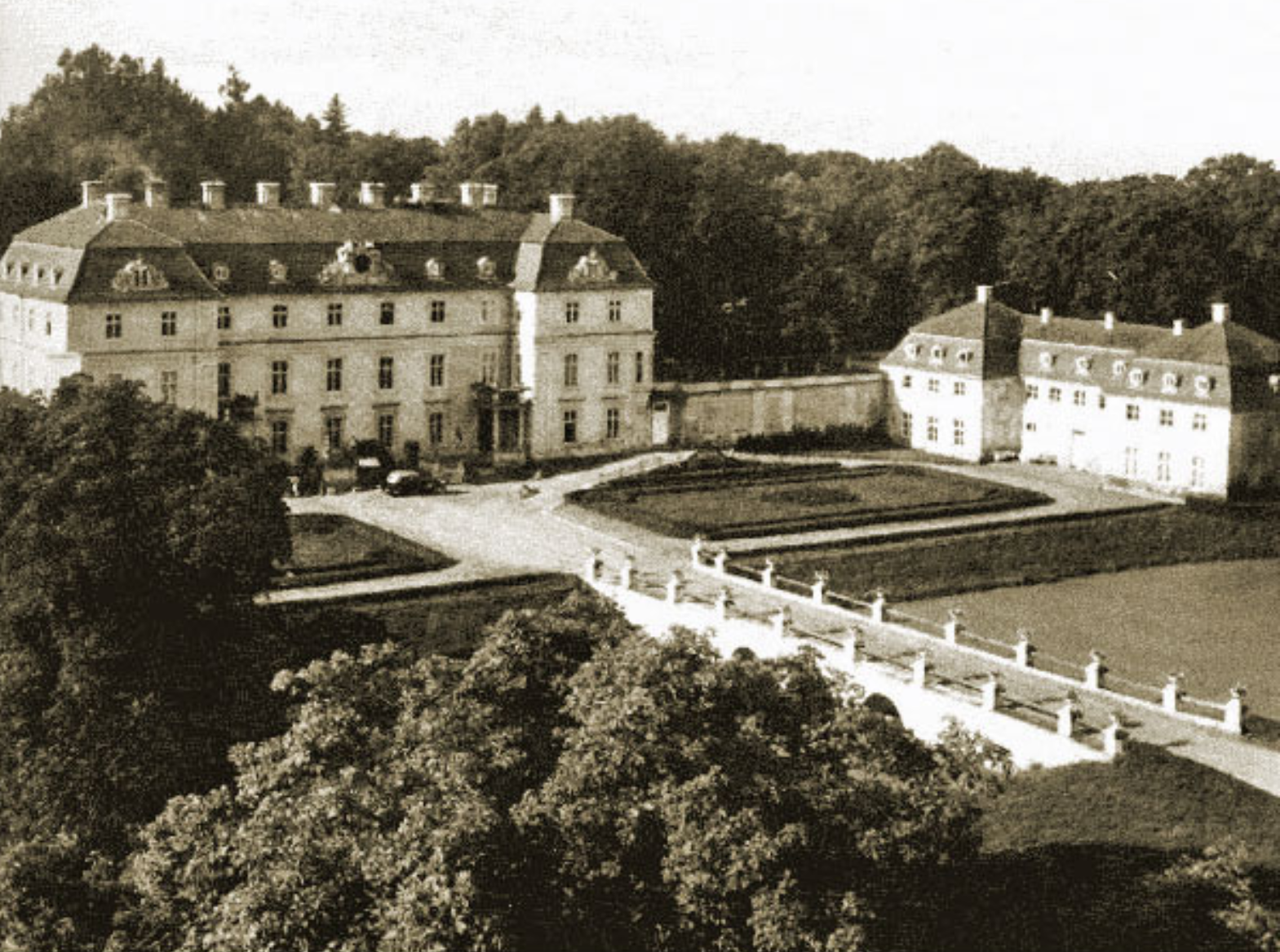
Aerial view in the early 20th century

Count Richard of Dohna-Schlobitten (1843–1916) was a Prussian politician and close friend to the German emperor, Wilhelm II (1859–1941), who often came to Schlobitten for hunting parties. In 1900, Count Richard was elevated to a hereditary prince. Prince Richard was part of the so-called Liebenberg Circle, a group of artistically minded aristocrats within the entourage of Wilhelm II, named after Prince Philipp of Eulenburg (1847–1921).

=== Second World War ===
The place was last renovated in 1944 by Prince Alexander zu Dohna-Schlobitten (1899–1997).

On 19 January 1945, the residents of the castle, along with the staff under the leadership of Prince Alexander, set out westward, totalling 330 people, 140 horses, and 38 wagons. They also took along 31 valuable Trakehner mares from their breeding program. The castle was looted, burned down and devastated upon the invasion by the Red Army.

=== Schlobitten Palace: 1945 till modern times ===
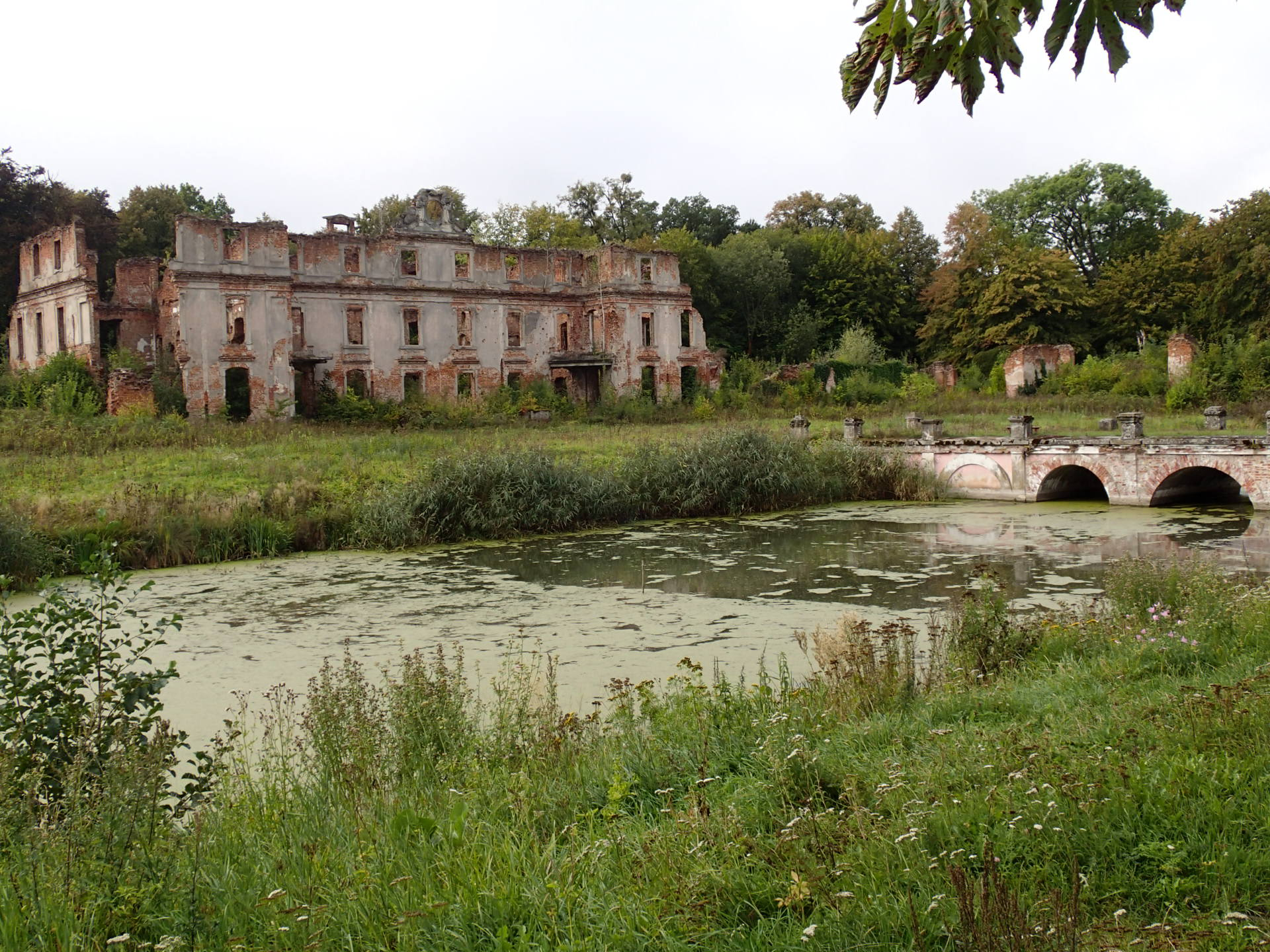
View of the ruins today

When the southern part of East Prussia came under Polish administration after World War II, Schloss Schlobitten and its estate were confiscated. The palace was hit by another fire in 1949. Various ancillary buildings were demolished and from the main buildings only the walls remain. The palace ruins are in poor condition and deteriorating. Also, not much remains anymore of the landscape park.

A group of Polish architecture students has been committed to the rebuilding of the palace, but there are no concrete plans yet.

=== Dohna-Schlobitten collection after the War ===
Already in 1944, parts of the valuable art collection, consisting of numerous baroque furniture pieces and paintings, tapestries, and Delft faience, including a tobacco box adorned with diamonds belonging to Frederick the Great, had been evacuated to the west by the last owner, prince Alexander of Dohna, partly by train and partly with a refugee convoy, along with part of the associated stud farm.

The evacuated artworks were housed in various castles of related or friendly families, including Schloss Muskau, but two-thirds of them fell victim to looting at the end of the war. Only the objects relocated to Schloss Laubach in Hesse were recovered by the Dohna family after the war. Parts of the collection seized in the East Germany were able to be returned to the inventory after German reunification.

The wish of Prince Alexander of Dohna to exhibit the rescued art inventory of Schlobitten Castle as a whole, prompted him to offer the items returned to him by various East German museums to the Prussian Palaces and Gardens Foundation Berlin-Brandenburg for purchase. The Foundation decided to take over the Dohna-Schlobitten collection in two tranches, in 1992 and 1999. It consists of over 1000 individual pieces, including 72 paintings, 35 pieces of furniture, over 200 porcelain and faience items, 48 glasses, over 600 objects made of precious and base metals, 250 individual craft items of various materials, and more than 500 textiles.

A part of the collection was housed in the Charlottenburg palace in Berlin. Since 2009, some of the rescued artworks from Schlobitten were on display at the Schönhausen Palace. However, many objects were stored in the foundation's depots. From 2023, the entire collection is exhibited in Schloss Doberlug in Doberlug-Kirchhain, a museum focused on Central European noble culture.

== Architecture ==
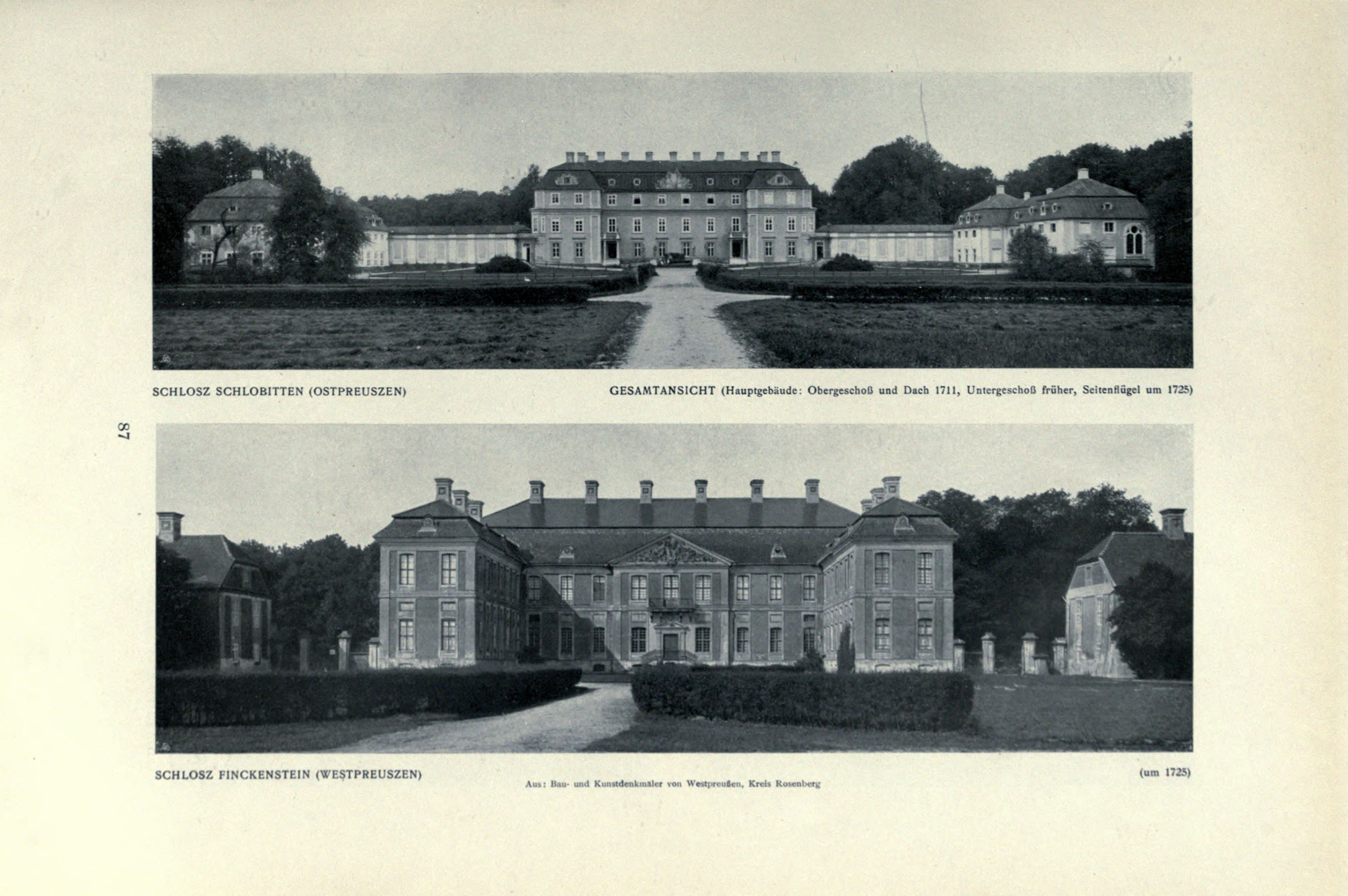
The palaces of Słobity and Kamieniec around 1908

The two-story main building was initially executed as a solid plastered structure with a basement in the Renaissance style, featuring dormers with three-tiered curved gables. In 1627, slightly separated from the main building, a single-story library building was added, along with an elongated gallery spanned by rib vaults.

A new construction in the Baroque style was commissioned from 1696 to 1736. Initially, the architect Jean Baptiste Broebes was responsible for the planning; he designed the layout of the castle complex and erected the east wing. From 1704 onwards, Johann Caspar Hindersin took over the leadership. He was assisted by the castle master builder Joachim Ludwig Schultheiß von Unfriedt as an expert advisor. For the interior design, Alexander was able to enlist the services of Joseph Anton Kraus, a student of Andreas Schlüter and a stucco artist, as well as the painter and fresco artist Giovanni Baptista Schannes, for several years. Kraus, possibly in collaboration with the stucco artist Johann Georg Pörtzel, designed the ballroom, the central section, the staircases, and the royal chambers.

=== Gallery: A tour of the palace interior in the first half of the 20th century ===
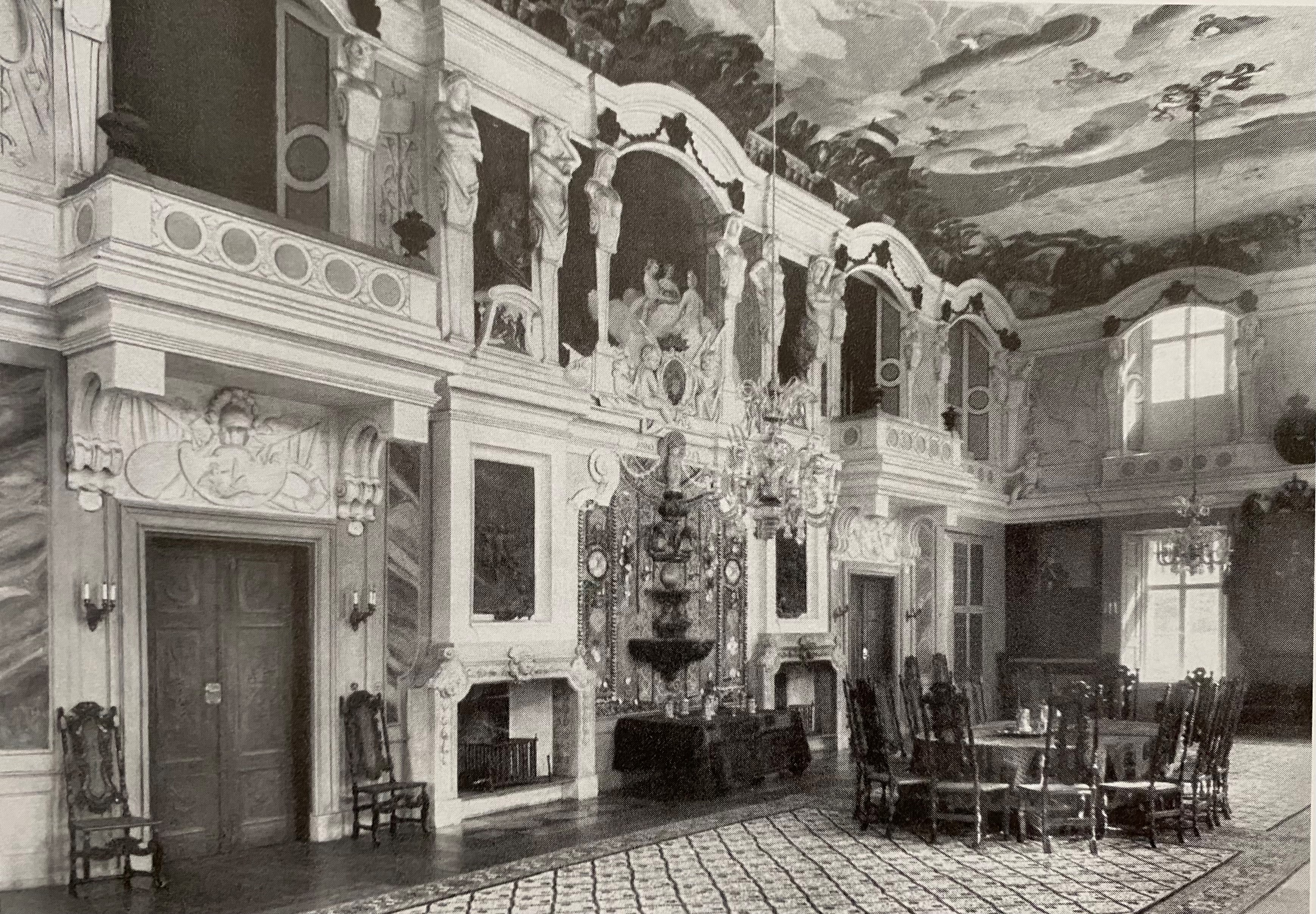
The Hall

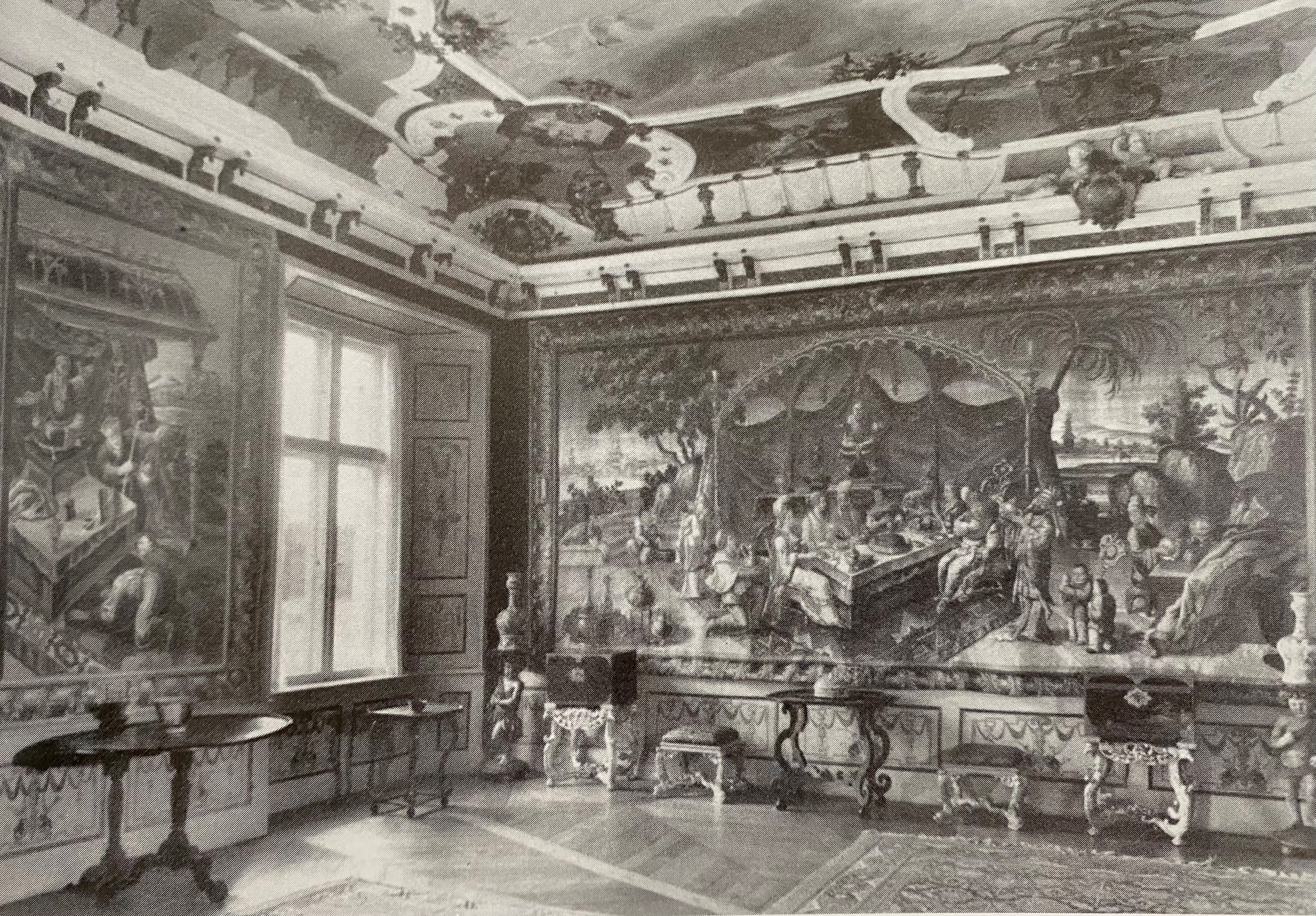
Antechambre in the royal apartment

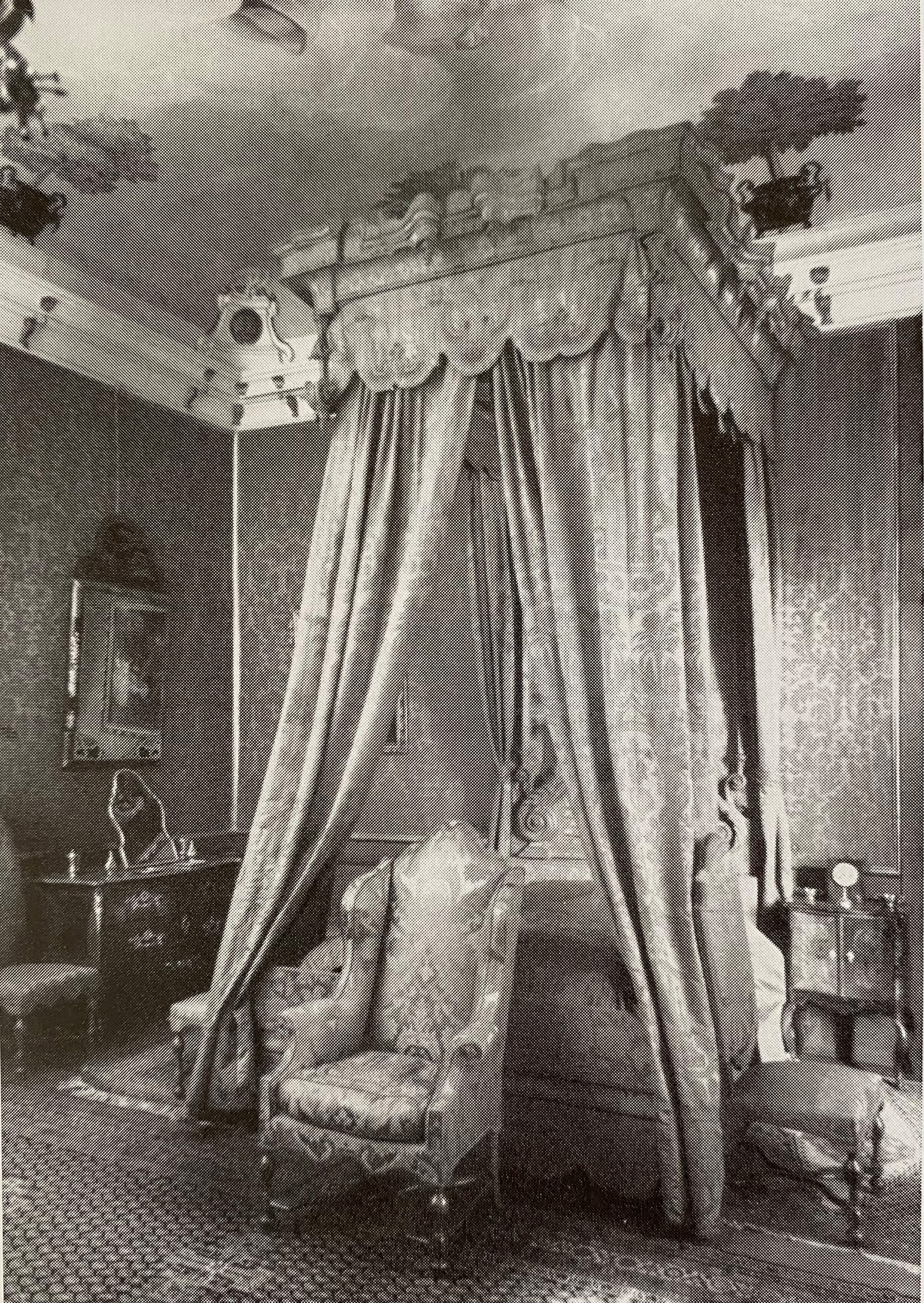
Bedroom in the royal apartment

== Art collection ==
The art collection of the castle, of which considerable remnants are still preserved in the Dohna-Schlobitten collection to this day, consisted of 450 paintings, in addition to decorative furniture, carpets, household items, textiles, porcelain, and Dutch faience. It also included drawings, miniatures, and small sculptures such as portrait busts. Alongside a few still lifes and biblical pieces, portraits from the 17th to the 19th century predominated in the collection, which largely survived the Second World War.

Particularly noteworthy are 22 portraits of members of the House of Orange-Nassau, the Dutch royal family, and 31 images of the House of Hohenzollern from Frederick William, Elector of Brandenburg, to Emperor Wilhelm II. The House of Orange was related to the Dohnas both by blood and politically, and through this connection, there was also a relationship to the Prussian royal family, the House of Hohenzollern, who used Schlobitten as a stopover on their travels. However, not all these portraits have known artists. There are paintings in the style of Michiel van Mierevelt, others could be from Jan de Baen, as well as Gerard and Willem van Honthorst, and Antoine Pesne are included in the collection. Many paintings, however, are only replicas of well-known portraits from other princely collections.

In addition to the royal portraits, family portraits occupy a large space. A significant piece is a large-format family portrait by Johannes Mytens from 1644. Some of these paintings were later supplemented by other painters, usually after the birth of children, grandchildren, and nephews. At that time, there were itinerant painters who moved from castle to castle and carried out commissioned work for princes and the landed gentry. Their names are often preserved in signatures, also on the backs of the pictures, but their works are mostly not of high artistic quality. However, more significant artists could also be afforded by the Dohnas. These included, for example, Johann Friedrich August Tischbein in the 19th century and well-known Königsberg artists such as Johann Eduard Wolff.

== Palace library ==
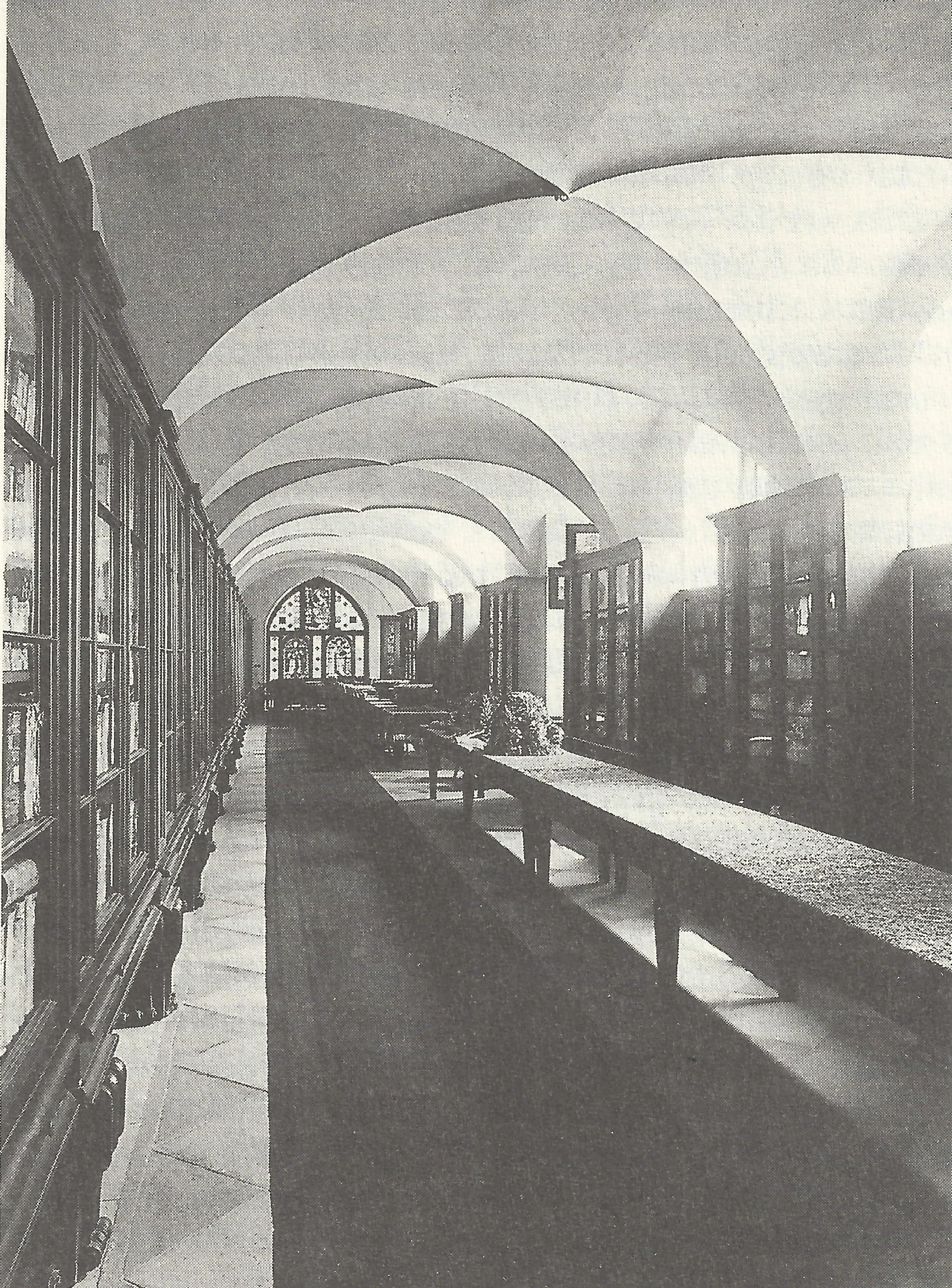
The palace library in 1915

Since 1627, there has been a library in Schlobitten, which, in addition to the Dohna archives, contained primarily first editions of well-known classical literature published since the 16th century; songbooks, travel literature, and Dutch novels that served as entertainment reading around 1700. But there were also works of political science and theological polemics from the time of religious conflicts after the Reformation in the library.

There were a few incunabula, among which the sermons of well-known theologians of the 15th century, such as Johann Geiler von Kaysersberg and Johannes de Bromyard, are noteworthy. From the 16th century, there were works by Erasmus of Rotterdam, a Bible dedicated by hand by Philipp Melanchthon from 1556, ten volumes of sermons by Martin Luther from 1555 to 1558, and an edition of Paracelsus' "Philosophia ad Athenienses" from 1564. A catalogue from 1858 lists over 55,000 volumes.

By the end of the 19th century, the collection had grown so significantly (prince Richard Wilhelm was an avid book collector) that the existing space needed to be expanded. Until then, the library had been housed in a 33-meter-long, six-meter-deep, and 4.30-meter-high room with a ribbed vault in the annex east of the main house, built during Abraham von Dohna's time. Now, rooms of the library were added to the corresponding annex on the west side of the castle. None of these buildings exist today.

== Literature ==
- Sieber, Helmut (1958). Schlösser und Herrensitz in Ost- und Westpreussen – Nach alten Stichen und Zeichnungen (in German). Frankfurt am Main: Wolfgang Weidlich. pp. 51–52.
- Grommelt, Carl; Von Mertens, Christine; Zu Dohna-Schlobitten, Alexander (1965). Das Dohnasche Schloss Schlobitten in Ostpreussen (in German). Stuttgart: W. Kohlhammer.
- von Lorck, Carl (1965). Landschlösser und Gutshäuser in Ost- und Westpreußen (in German). Frankfurt am Main: Weidlich. pp. 219, 221.
- Gräfin Eulenburg, Adelheid; Engels, Hans (1992). Ostpreußische Gutshäuser in Polen: Gegenwart und Erinnerung (in German). C.H. Beck Verlag. p. 136. ISBN 978-3406367984.
- Antoni, Michael (1993). Dehio-Handbuch der Kunstdenkmäler West- und Ostpreußen (in German). München: Deutscher Kunstverlag. pp. 560–561. ISBN 3-422-03025-5.
- Heckmann, Hermann (1998). Baumeister des Barock und Rokoko in Brandenburg-Preussen (in German). Berlin: Verlag für Bauwesen. p. 506. ISBN 3-345-00631-6.
- Garniec, Mirosław; Jackiewicz-Garniec, Małgorzata (2001). Schlösser und Gutshäuser im ehemaligen Ostpreussen (in German). Arta. p. 400. ISBN 978-8391284032.
- Korduba, Piotr (2010). "Die Einrichtung einer spätbarocken Residenz in Ostpreußen. Zur Bedeutung von Schloss Schlobitten". In Woldt, Isabella; Zuchowski, Tadeusz J. (eds.). Im Schatten von Berlin und Warschau Adelssitze im Herzogtum Preußen und Nordpolen 1650-1850 (in German). Berlin: Dietrich Reimer Verlag. pp. 187–204. ISBN 978-3496014102.
- Zu Dohna-Schlobitten, Alexander (2013). Erinnerungen eines alten Ostpreußen (in German). Würzburg: Rautenberg. p. 384.
- Zu Dohna, Lothar (2013). "Schlobitten". Die Dohnas und ihre Häuser. Profil einer europäischen Familie – Band 2 (in German). Göttingen: Wallstein. pp. 701–715. ISBN 978-3835312371.
