= Finckenstein =

Finckenstein may refer to:

- Finck von Finckenstein, a German aristocratic family, Imperial Counts of the Holy Roman Empire and Counts in Prussia
- Finckenstein Palace, (Schloss Finckenstein) in former East Prussia, today Poland
- Kamieniec Suski, Poland, prior to 1945: Finckenstein a village in former East Prussia
- Treaty of Finckenstein (1807)
- Finckenstein coat of arms
- Finkenstein am Faaker See, town in Carinthia in Austria from where the Finck von Finckenstein family originally comes from according to the Imperial Count Diploma
- Burgruine Finkenstein, the Finkenstein ruined castle in Carinthia, Austria
