= Alexander zu Dohna-Schlobitten =

Alexander zu Dohna-Schlobitten may refer to:

- Alexander zu Dohna-Schlobitten (1661–1728), Prussian field marshal and diplomat
- Alexander zu Dohna-Schlobitten (1899–1997), German soldier, businessman and author
