= Hermann Dohna-Finckenstein =

German politician (1894–1942)

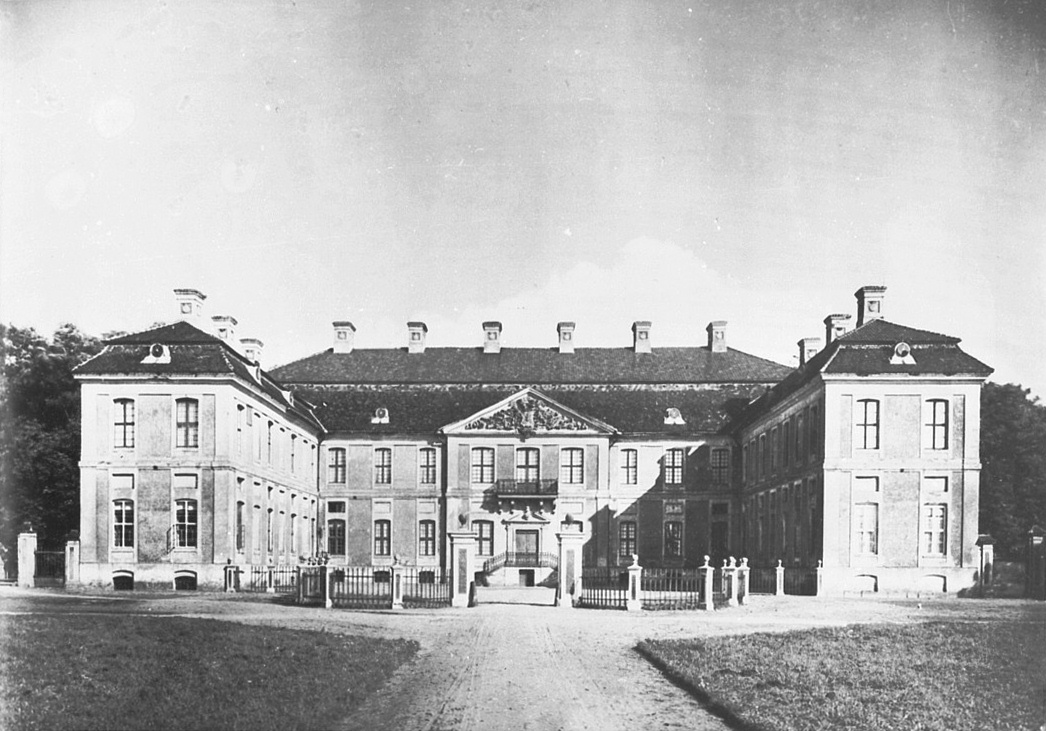
- Schloss Finckenstein, before 1931

Prussian State Councilor
- In office December 1933 – 13 December 1942

Deputy District Administrator Rosenberg District
- In office 1927–1937

Personal details
- Born: Hermann zu Dohna-Schlobitten; 10 October 1894 Allenstein, East Prussia, Kingdom of Prussia, German Empire
- Died: 13 December 1942 (age 48) Finckenstein Palace, Reichsgau Danzig-West Prussia, Nazi Germany
- Party: Nazi Party
- Parents: Carl Burggraf und Graf zu Dohna-Schlobitten (father); Elsa, Gräfin von der Schulenburg-Tressow (mother)
- Education: University of Bonn
- Profession: Estate owner

Military service
- Allegiance: German Empire; Nazi Germany
- Branch/service: Imperial German Army; Schutzstaffel
- Years of service: 1914–1918; 1931–1942
- Rank: Leutnant der reserves SS-Obersturmbannführer
- Unit: 2nd (1st Brandenburg) Dragoon Regiment
- Battles/wars: World War I
- Awards: Iron Cross, 2nd class

Hermann Werner Rodrigo Heinrich Friedrich Donatus Burggraf und Graf zu Dohna-Finckenstein (10 October 1894 – 13 December 1942) was a German estate owner, politician and SS-Obersturmbannführer.

== Early life and education ==
Dohna-Finckenstein was born into an old noble family in Allenstein (today, Olsztyn). His father Carl was a landowner and Landrat (District Administrator). Hermann attended the Gymnasium of Braunsberg (today, Braniewo), Potsdam and Rastenburg (today, Kętrzyn). During the First World War, he served in the Imperial German Army as a Leutnant of reserves in the 2nd (1st Brandenburg) Dragoon Regiment. He left the military after the war's end, having been awarded the Iron Cross, 2nd class. Like his father and younger brother, he attended Bonn University and was a member of the Corps Borussia Bonn student corps.

== Estate owner, politician and SS officer ==
Upon the death of his childless uncle, Alfred Dohna-Schlobitten (1852–1929), Dohna-Finckenstein inherited the Finckenstein Palace and its estate, which he managed during the difficult time following the agricultural crisis of the late 1920s and during the economic crisis of the early 1930s. From 1927 to 1937 he served as a local government official, the Kreisdeputierter (Deputy District Administrator) of the Rosenberg district in West Prussia.

On 1 November 1931, Dohna-Finckenstein joined the Nazi Party (membership number 808,228) and the SS (SS number 102,880). On 10 March 1934, he was commissioned an SS-Sturmführer in SS-Standarte 64, based in Marienwerder (today, Kwidzyn) West Prussia. On 20 April 1935 he was promoted to SS-Obersturmführer, on 16 June 1935 to SS-Hauptsturmführer and on 12 September 1937 to SS-Sturmbannführer in SS Abschnitt XXII, headquartered in Allenstein. His final promotion was to SS-Obersturmbannführer.

At the end of 1933, Prussian Minister-president Hermann Göring appointed Dohna-Finckenstein to the Prussian State Council, and he remained a member until his death. In 1934 he became a Prussian Provincial Councilor for the Province of East Prussia and later headed the department for forestry of the Danzig–West Prussian State Farmers' Association. He also served as a member of the board of directors of a sugar factory in Riesenburg (today, Prabuty) and as a member of the Danzig advisory board of Deutsche Bank. He died at Finckenstein Palace on 13 December 1942.

== See also ==
- Finckenstein Palace
