= Hermann Josef Wehrle =

German Catholic priest (1899–1944)

- Born: 26 July 1899; Nuremberg, Kingdom of Bavaria, German Empire
- Died: 14 September 1944 (aged 45); Plötzensee Prison, Berlin, Nazi Germany
- Cause of death: Execution by hanging
- Occupation: Priest

Hermann Josef Wehrle (26 July 1899 – 14 September 1944) was a German Catholic priest who was killed after the 20 July plot.

Wehrle was drafted into the German Army in World War I. On 10 December 1918 he joined the Catholic Priest seminary at Fulda but quit soon and began to study Philosophy and Catholic philosophy in Frankfurt. He worked as a journalist and at the public library of Frankfurt.

In 1938 Wehrle worked at the public school of Marktbreit, but was forced to resign because of his lack of support for the Nazis. He then started to study Catholic theology at the abbey of St. Ottilien. After the monastery was dissolved in April 1941 Wehrle joined the priest seminary of Freising and was ordained on 6 April 1942. He worked at the Catholic congregations of Planegg and in Heilig Blut (Munich – Bogenhausen) and was in contact to Alfred Delp.

On 13 December 1943 Ludwig Freiherr von Leonrod asked him under the seal of confession about the theological justification of a tyrannicide. Leonrod was involved in the 20 July plot and told the Gestapo about his confession. Wehrle was arrested on 18 August 1944 and examined as a witness in the trial against Leonrod.

He was sentenced to death by the Volksgerichtshof on 14 September 1944 for his knowledge of the plot and executed the same day in Plötzensee Prison next to Heinrich zu Dohna-Schlobitten, Nikolaus von Üxküll-Gyllenband and Michael von Matuschka.

Wehrlestraße in Bogenhausen is named after him.
