= Michael von Matuschka =

German politician

Michael Graf von Matuschka
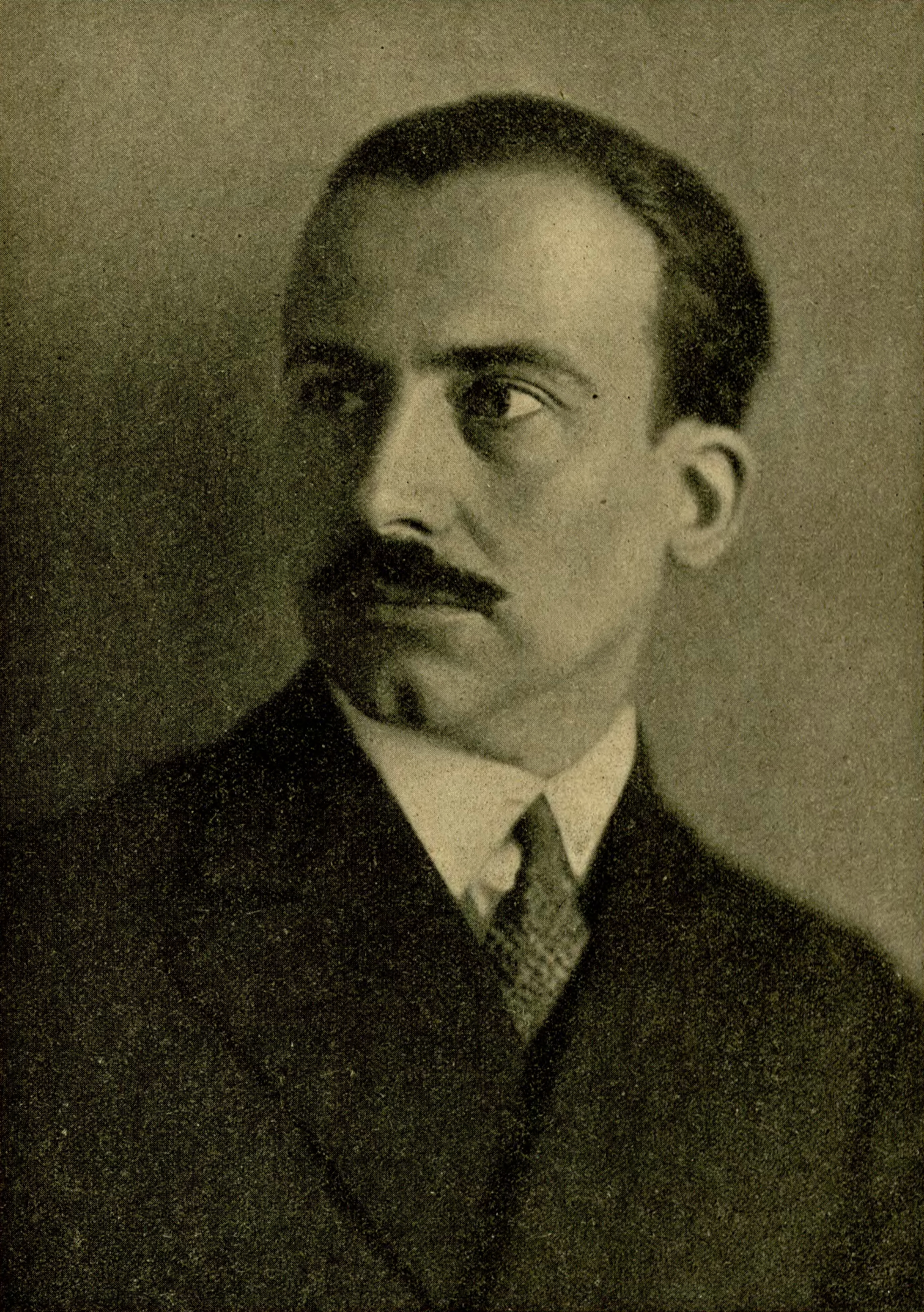

Prussian Landtag
- In office 1932–1933

Personal details
- Born: 29 September 1888 Schweidnitz, Silesia, German Empire
- Died: 14 September 1944 (aged 55) Plötzensee Prison, Berlin, Nazi Germany
- Cause of death: Execution by hanging
- Party: Centre Party
- Spouse: Pia Gräfin von Stillfried und Rattonitz
- Children: 4
- Occupation: jurist

Michael Graf von Matuschka (29 September 1888 – 14 September 1944) was a German politician who took part in the 20 July plot.

== Biography ==
Matuschka was born in Schweidnitz, Silesia (today Świdnica, Poland) and studied law at the University of Lausanne, the Ludwig-Maximilians-Universität München, the Friedrich Wilhelm University of Berlin, and the University of Breslau, where he passed his doctorate in 1910. He joined the Prussian Army as a one year-volunteer at the 4th Silesian Hussars Regiment. Matuschka worked as a junior civil servant in the provincial government administration of Westfalia until 1914. In World War I he was wounded on the Eastern Front in 1915 and became a Prisoner of War in Russian captivity. In 1918, he managed to escape and returned to Germany.

After the end of World War I he worked in several administrative positions and became the county commissioner (Landrat) of Oppeln in May 1923. He was elected for the Center Party as a member of the Prussian Landtag in 1932 but was forced to resign in 1933 as member of the Landtag and as Landrat of Oppeln. Matuschka worked in the Prussian Ministry of Interior in Berlin and at the administration of the Province of Silesia, where he met Fritz-Dietlof von der Schulenburg.

In 1942, Matuschka became an administrative economic adviser in annexed Regierungsbezirk Kattowitz. He was supposed to become the head of administration of Silesia by the plotters of 20 July 1944 and was arrested by the Gestapo after the plot failed. Matuschka was sentenced to death by the Volksgerichtshof on 14 September 1944 and executed the same day in Plötzensee Prison next to Heinrich zu Dohna-Schlobitten, Hermann Josef Wehrle and Nikolaus von Üxküll-Gyllenband.

Matuschka was married to Pia née Gräfin von Stillfried und Rattonitz, with whom he had three sons and a daughter.
