= Nikolaus von Üxküll-Gyllenband =

German businessman and 20 July Plotter (1877–1944)

Nikolaus Graf von Üxküll-Gyllenband
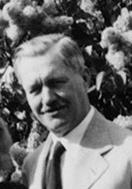
- Born: 14 February 1877; Kőszeg, Austria-Hungary
- Died: 14 September 1944 (aged 67); Plötzensee Prison, Berlin, Nazi Germany
- Cause of death: Execution by hanging

Nikolaus Graf von Üxküll-Gyllenband (14 February 1877 – 14 September 1944) was a German businessman who took part in the 20 July plot.

Nikolaus von Üxküll-Gyllenband was born in Kőszeg (German: Güns), Kingdom of Hungary and joined the Austro-Hungarian Army prior to the First World War. After the war Üxküll worked as a businessman in Germany.

He was an uncle of Claus von Stauffenberg. In autumn of 1939, Üxküll and Fritz-Dietlof von der Schulenburg contacted Stauffenberg and tried to win him for a coup d'état against Hitler.

In the planning of the 20 July plot, Üxküll was supposed to become the liaison officer for the military district of the Protectorate of Bohemia and Moravia. After the plot failed, Üxküll was arrested by the Gestapo on 23 July 1944. Üxküll gave the atrocities in the Nazi concentration camps as the reason for his involvement in the plot.

He was sentenced to death by the Volksgerichtshof on 14 September 1944, and executed that same day at Plötzensee Prison, next to Heinrich zu Dohna-Schlobitten, Hermann Josef Wehrle, and Michael von Matuschka.
