= Alexander zu Dohna-Schlobitten (1899–1997) =

German Junker, soldier, businessman and author

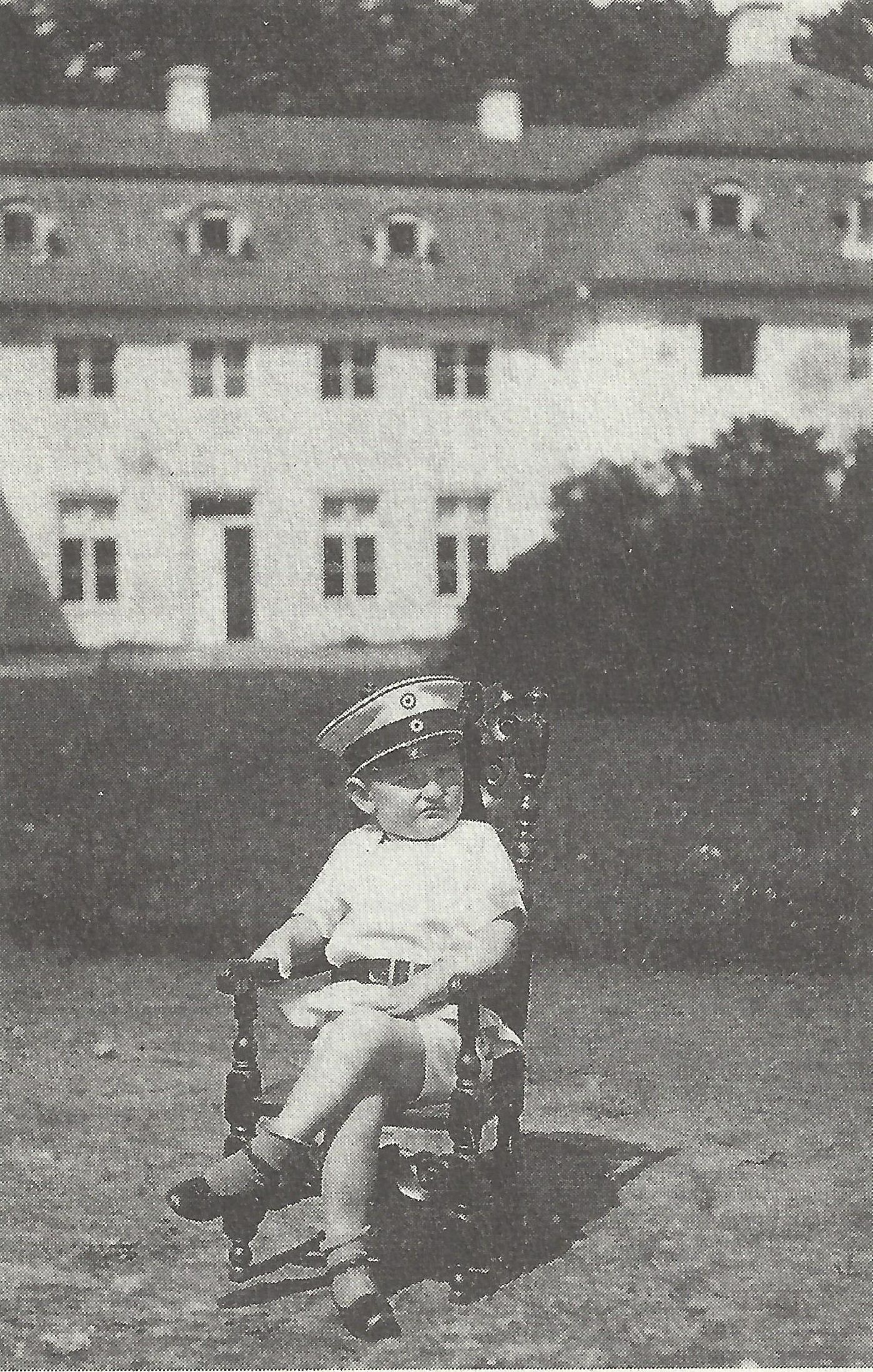
Alexander zu Dohna-Schlobitten at the age of 4 or 5.

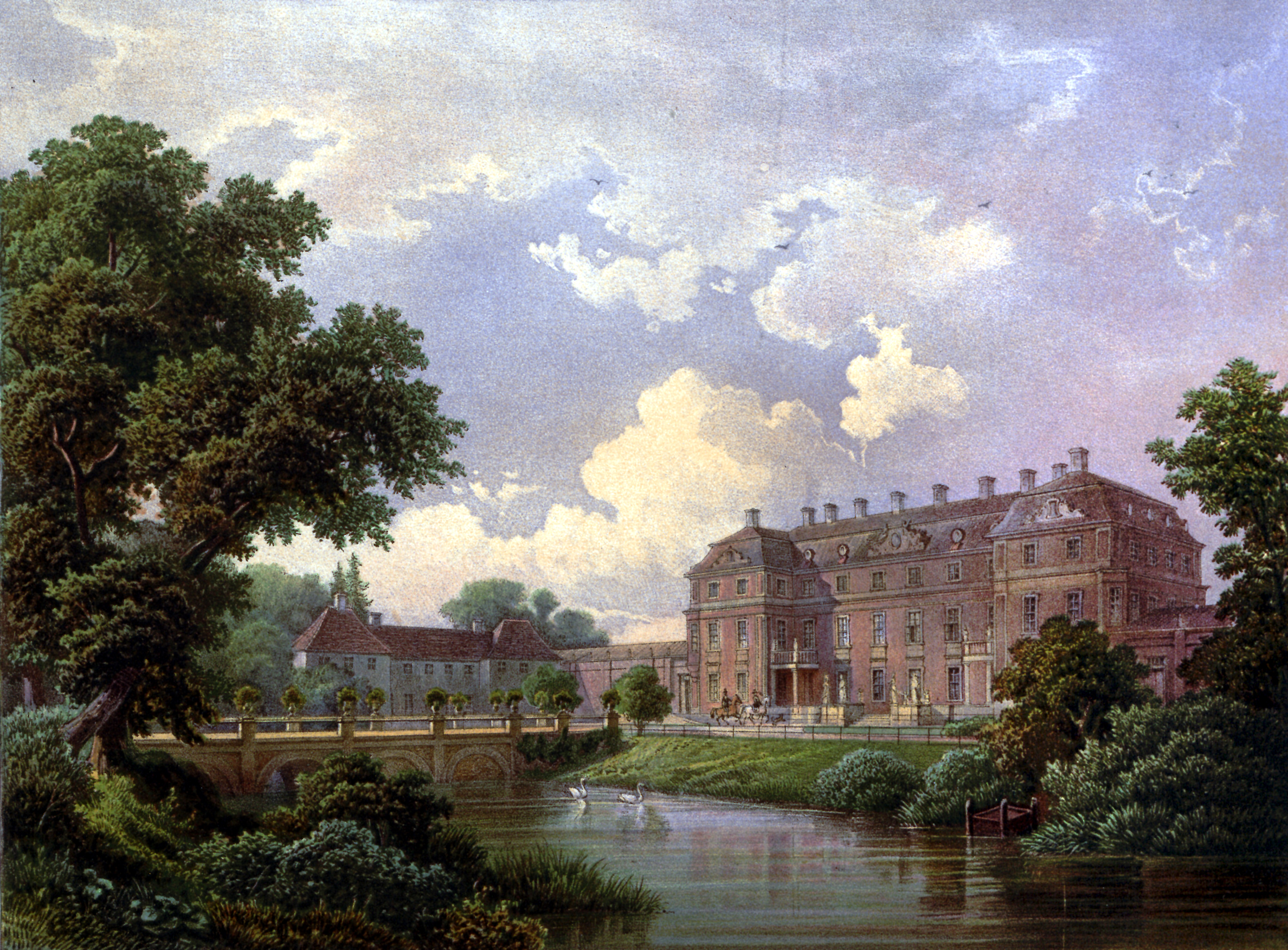
Painting of the Schlobitten Palace between 1857 and 1883.

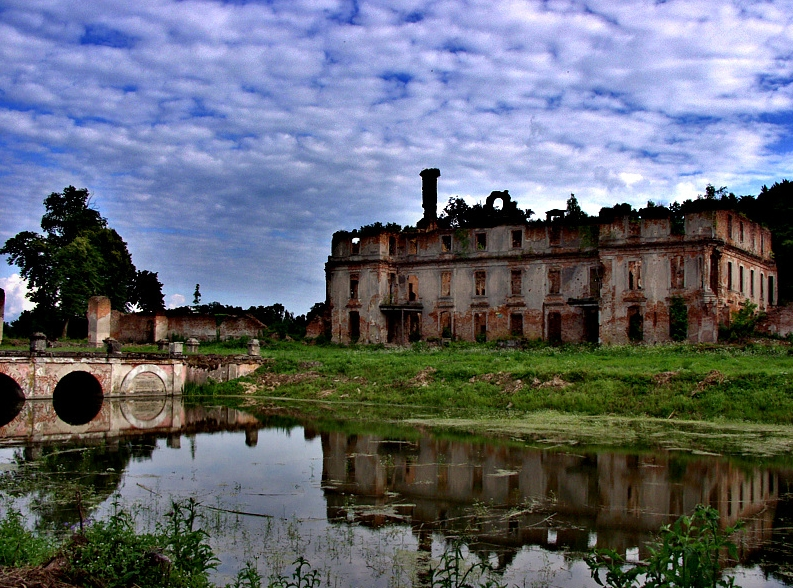
The ruins of the Schlobitten Palace at Słobity, Poland (formerly East Prussia)

Wilhelm Hermann Alexander Fürst zu Dohna-Schlobitten (Alexander, Prince zu Dohna-Schlobitten; 11 December 1899 – 29 October 1997) was a German Junker, soldier, businessman and author.

== Early life ==
Dohna was born in Potsdam, the son of Richard Emil Prince zu Dohna-Schlobitten (1872–1918) by his marriage to Princess Marie Mathilde zu Solms-Hohensolms-Lich. He grew up in Potsdam, where his father was in the service of the Gardes du Corps, and at his family's estate of Schlobitten.

After the outbreak of World War I, due to the danger of invasion by the Russians, Dohna was evacuated to Darmstadt, together with his siblings, where they lived at the court of his uncle-in-law Ernest Louis, Grand Duke of Hesse. In 1916 he moved to Davos, Switzerland, where he passed his Abitur in 1918.

On 1 June 1918 he joined the Prussian Army regiment Garde du Corps and was deployed to Ukraine for a short time before the War ended in November. He returned to Schlobitten after his father's death, received a training in agriculture and forestry, and studied at the University of Bonn. From 1924 until 1945 he administered the family estates of Schlobitten and Prökelwitz.

== World War II ==
After the Nazis came to power in Germany, Dohna, who was a classmate of Karl Wolff, met Heinrich Himmler and Hermann Göring and joined the SS as a candidate. However, under the influence of Kurt von Plettenberg and his uncle Heinrich Graf zu Dohna-Schlobitten, he distanced himself from going in that direction. Over the course of the 1930s, he distanced himself from politics.

Dohna was drafted into the Wehrmacht at the start of World War II and served as a Rittmeister throughout the German invasion of Poland and later the Soviet Union. On 18 January 1943 he was one of the last to be evacuated from Stalingrad, carrying personal letters and the awards of Friedrich Paulus. From January 1944 he served with the LXXV Army Corps in Italy. In March 1944, a U.S. Army commando group of 15 men had landed near La Spezia to blow up railway tunnels as part of Operation Ginny II but were captured by German and Italian troops. Even though these men were wearing US Army uniforms (and were therefore POWs), Dohna was ordered to sign the execution orders. However, Dohna refused to do so as this would have violated the 1929 Geneva Convention on Prisoners of War (thereby constituting a war crime); he was dismissed from the Wehrmacht for this insubordination. General Anton Dostler, who signed the execution order, was tried for this war crime after hostilities ended. Dostler was subsequently convicted, sentenced to death and executed by firing squad.

Dohna returned to Schlobitten during the Soviet Army take-over. He organized the flight of the populace of his estates and left Schlobitten on 22 January 1945. With 330 refugees, 140 horses and 38 horse carts he arrived at Hoya on 20 March 1945. The caravan brought Trakehner horses with them, including 31 broodmares, ensuring the survival of that breed.

== Post-war ==
Shortly before the end of the war Dohna was able to save a significant portion of the inventory of Schlobitten Castle before it was destroyed by arson following occupation by the Red Army. Dohna lived in Thedinghausen from 1945 to 1948. He moved to Switzerland in 1948 and worked for Hoffmann-La Roche. From 1961 to 1979 he owned a dry-cleaning company in Lörrach.

== Personal life ==
In 1926, Dohna married Countess Freda Antoinette von Arnim-Muskau (1905–1999). They had six children between 1927 and 1943.

Since his grandfather, Prince Richard (1843-1916) and father, Prince Richard (1872-1918) both died toward the end of the Great War, Alexander became the head of his branch of the House of Dohna before World War II. The Kingdom of Prussia had incorporated the lands of the various branches (Lauck, Schlobitten, Reichertswalde and Schlodien-Carwinden) into a privileged family trust in 1840, of which Alexander became a primary beneficiary. Alexander was also the male heir of the Schlobittens, entitled by hereditary grant of 1 January 1900 to bear the title of Prince, as well as Burgrave, and the style of Serene Highness, titles recognised post-monarchy by Germany only as part of his surname. (The other two surviving branches of the Dohna-Schlobitten line were never elevated to princely status; the family historically carried only comital rank, their burgravial fief never having been declared an Imperial State within the Holy Roman Empire.)

Alexander was succeeded as head of the Dohna-Schlobitten princely line by the eldest of his sons, the Burgrave Friedrich (born 1933), who has declined to make use of the family's princely title. By his former wife, Countess Alexandra Hahn von Burgsdorff (born 1943), Friedrich is the father of five children including his own heir, Count Rüdiger zu Dohna-Schlobitten (born 1966), a software designer in Karlsruhe.

The Dohna-Schlobitten art collection was exhibited in Berlin's Schönhausen Palace in 2019.

== Death ==
in 1979 he moved to Basel, Switzerland where he wrote his memoirs and where he died in 1997 at the age of 97.

== Publications ==
- Das Dohnasche Schloß Schlobitten in Ostpreußen ['The Dohna Castle of Schlobitten in East Prussia'], with Carl Grommelt, Christine von Mertens, Lothar Count zu Dohna and Christian Krollmann (Stuttgart, 1965)
- Erinnerungen eines alten Ostpreußen ['Recollections of an old East Prussian'] (Berlin, 1989)

== See also ==
- Dohna (disambiguation)
- Dohna-Schlobitten
- Dohna Castle
