= Heinrich zu Dohna-Schlobitten =

German general (1882–1944)

Heinrich Burggraf und Graf zu Dohna-Schlobitten
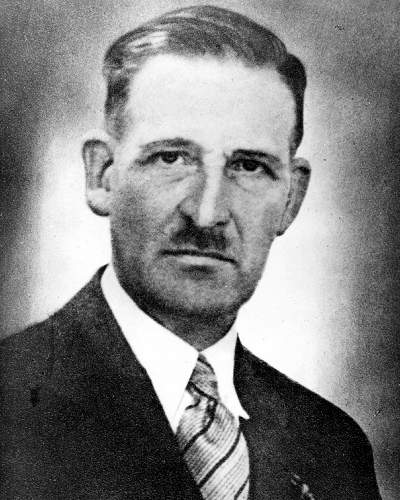
- Born: 15 October 1882; Waldburg/Königsberg, East Prussia, Imperial Germany
- Died: 14 September 1944 (aged 61); Plötzensee Prison, Berlin, Nazi Germany
- Cause of death: Execution by hanging
- Military career
- Allegiance: German Empire; Nazi Germany
- Branch: German Army
- Service years: 1901–1919; 1939–1943
- Rank: Generalmajor
- Conflicts: World War I World War II

Heinrich Burggraf und Graf zu Dohna-Schlobitten (15 October 1882 – 14 September 1944) was a German major general and resistance fighter in the 20 July Plot to assassinate Adolf Hitler at the Wolf's Lair in East Prussia. He was a Knight of Justice of the Order of St John, which was regarded with disfavour by the Nazis.

== Early life ==
Dohna-Schlobitten was born to Eberhard Graf zu Dohna-Schlobitten (1846–1905) and his wife Elisabeth née Gräfin von Kanitz (1851–1936) in Waldburg (now Nikolajewka, Russia) near Königsberg, East Prussia, the son of the famous Prussian noble family Dohna-Schlobitten. He grew up on his parents' estate near Königsberg, where he was strongly influenced by this mother's Christian faith. After graduating from high school in 1901, he began his career as a professional soldier and was already an ensign (Fahnenjunker) in the Prussian Army by 1901. In the First World War, he served as a General Staff officer (Generalstabsoffizier) in the 240th Infantry Division on the Western Front. He was released from the army as a Major in 1919. He subsequently became a member of the Baltische Landwehr but on ethical grounds he chose to leave the military and study agriculture. In 1920 he married Maria-Agnes von Borcke (1895–1983). He devoted himself to Tolksdorf, his wife's family estate. Later on he opposed Nazism and became active in the Confessing Church's Bruderrat ("brother council") in the old-Prussian Ecclesiastical Province of East Prussia.

== World War II ==
In 1939, Dohna-Schlobitten was remobilized as a General Staff officer and was appointed as Chief of Staff in Defence District I in Königsberg, later to be promoted to Chief of Staff, Army Group Centre. He acted as a corps leader in France, Norway and Finland.

Dohna-Schlobitten's last post was as major general and Chief of the Acting General Command in Danzig (now Gdańsk, Poland), before leaving the Wehrmacht at his own request in 1943. Thereafter, he earned his livelihood from farming in Tolksdorf (now Tołkiny, Poland) in East Prussia.

Dohna-Schlobitten maintained contacts with resistance leader Carl Friedrich Goerdeler, and was soon involved in Helmuth James von Moltke's Kreisau Circle through fellow aristocrat Peter Yorck von Wartenburg. Had the attempt on Hitler's life on 20 July 1944 succeeded, Dohna-Schlobitten was foreseen as East Prussia's new provincial administrator. The day after Claus Schenk von Stauffenberg's failed assassination attempt with a briefcase bomb, Dohna-Schlobitten and his wife were arrested, and on 14 September 1944, he was sentenced to death in Roland Freisler's infamous Nazi Volksgerichtshof (People's Court). He was executed the same day at Plötzensee Prison, along with Nikolaus von Üxküll-Gyllenband, Hermann Josef Wehrle and Michael von Matuschka.

Dohna was married to Maria-Agnes née von Borcke, with whom he had a daughter Ursula (1922–2022) and three sons, Lothar (1924–2021), Fabian (1926–2006) and Karl Albrecht (1921–1941). Maria-Agnes was sent to the Ravensbrück concentration camp after her arrest on 21 July 1944. She survived the war and died in 1983.
