= Karl Friedrich Emil zu Dohna-Schlobitten =

Prussian field marshal (1784-1859)

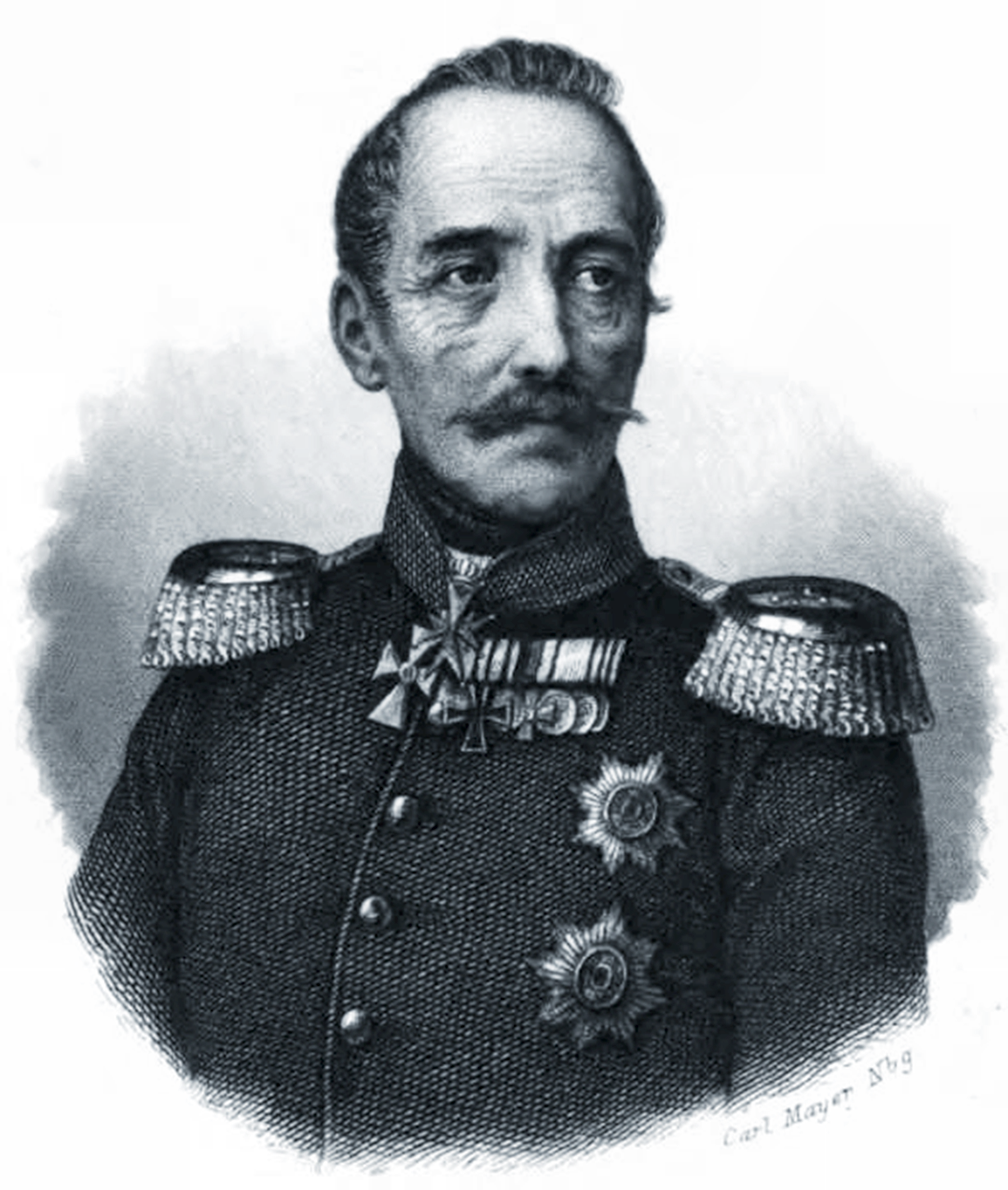
- Born: 4 March 1784; Schlobitten, East Prussia
- Died: 21 February 1859 (aged 74); Berlin, Prussia
- Military career
- Allegiance: (Kingdom of Prussia) Prussia (Russia) Russian Empire
- Branch: Prussian Army; Imperial Russian Army
- Service years: 1798-1854
- Rank: Field Marshal
- Conflicts: Napoleonic Wars
- Awards: Pour le Mérite

Karl Friedrich Emil zu Dohna-Schlobitten (4 March 1784 – 21 February 1859) was a Prussian field marshal.

== Early life ==
Dohna-Schlobitten was born at his family's estate of Schlobitten (today Słobity, Poland) to Burggraf and Graf Friedrich Alexander zu Dohna-Schlobitten (1741–1810) and his wife, Caroline Finck von Finckenstein (1746–1825).

== Biography ==
In 1798 Dohna joined the Prussian Army, where he met Gerhard von Scharnhorst, whose daughter Julie (1788–1827) he married in 1809. Dohna left the Prussian Army after Prussia had to deploy subsidiary troops in Napoleon's Russian campaign and joined the Imperial Russian Army instead. He commanded the 2nd Hussar Regiment of the Tsarist Russian–German Legion and fought at Borodino. In 1812 he took part in the negotiations of the Convention of Tauroggen, rejoined the Prussian Army and commanded the 8th Uhlan Regiment in the Battle of Waterloo.

Dohna was promoted to a Lieutenant General in 1837 and with his retirement in 1854 to a Fieldmarshal and Royal chamberlain of Frederick William IV of Prussia.

Dohna died in Berlin, where he had lived after his retirement and was buried at the Invalidenfriedhof.

A part of the fortification of Königsberg, the Dohna-Turm, which is today the location of an amber-museum, was named in his honour.

== Personal life ==
On 10 November 1809 he married Julie Klara Sophie von Scharnhorst (1788-1827), daughter of Prussian General Gerhard von Scharnhorst. They had:

- Burggraf and Graf Adalbert zu Dohna-Schlobitten (1811-1877); married to Charlotte Wahl (1834-1909) and had issue
- Burggraf and Graf Balduin zu Dohna-Schlobitten (1813-1843)
- Burggräfin and Gräfin Magdalene Juliana zu Dohna-Schlobitten (1817-1894)
- Burggraf and Graf Siegmar zu Dohna-Schlobitten (1808-1909)
- Burggräfin and Gräfin Clara zu Dohna-Schlobitten (1818-1862); married to Rudolph von Chaumontet (1815-1861)
- Burggraf and Graf Lothar zu Dohna-Schlobitten (1824-1906)
