= Friedrich Ferdinand Alexander zu Dohna-Schlobitten =

Prussian politician (1771–1831)

Friedrich Ferdinand Alexander zu Dohna-Schlobitten (29 March 1771 – 31 March 1831) was a Prussian politician.

== Early life ==
Dohna-Schlobitten was born at Finckenstein (today Kamieniec, Poland) to Friedrich Alexander Burggraf und Graf zu Dohna-Schlobitten (1741–1810) and Caroline née Finck von Finckenstein (1746–1825).

He studied cameralistics at the Universities of Frankfurt (Oder) and Göttingen. In Hamburg, where he visited a commercial college, Dohna became a friend of Alexander von Humboldt.

== Career ==
In 1790 he joined the Royal Prussian War and Domain Chamber (Kriegs- und Domänenkammer) in Berlin and was promoted to the Director of the regional chamber in Marienwerder in 1801.

After the Prussian defeat at Jena and Auerstedt in 1806, Dohna did not pay homage to Napoleon but just assured the local authorities wouldn't act against the French troops. Dohna was voluntarily detained as a hostage to secure his pledge. In April 1807, Dohna negotiated with Napoleon at the Finckenstein Palace on a French-Prussian separate peace and achieved a waiver of contribution payments of the province of West Prussia.

On 4 August 1807 Friedrich Wilhelm III of Prussia appointed Dohna to the President of the Royal War and Domain Chamber. On proposal of Heinrich Friedrich Karl vom Stein, Dohna became his successor as Prussian minister of Interior after Stein was forced to leave his office on French pressure in 1808. As such Dohna supported the foundation of the University of Berlin by Wilhelm von Humboldt.

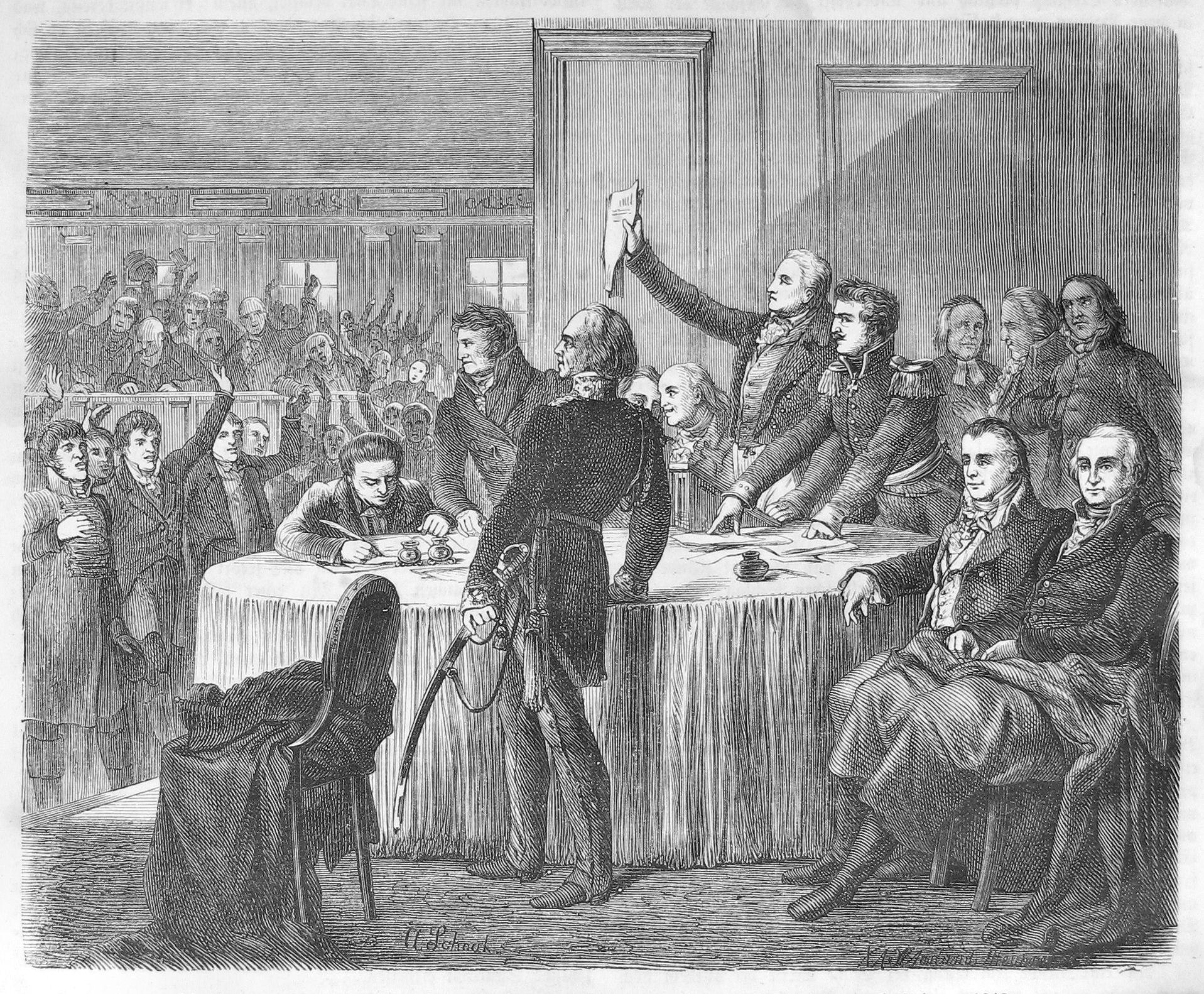
The Prussian estates at Königsberg in 1813.

Dohna came into opposition to Karl August von Hardenberg and left office in November 1810. He returned to his estates in East Prussia and organized a meeting of the Prussian estates in Königsberg with Ludwig Yorck von Wartenburg on 5 February 1813 after the Convention of Tauroggen. Here Dohna was elected the Chairman of the Commission of People's Armament and organized the resistance against the retreating French troops after Napoleon's Russian campaign.

Cooperating with Carl von Clausewitz he elaborated an adjustment to create the Prussian Landwehr, which was subsequently approved by the Prussian King on 17 March 1813, and was appointed to the Civil Governor of Prussian territory East of the Vistula. After this position was abandoned in June 1814 Dohna retired again and returned to his estate of Schlobitten. He was still active in regional politics and was a deputy of the district of Mohrungen in the first East Prussian Parliament in 1824. He also protested against the Karlsbad Decrees in 1820.

== Personal life ==
Dohna died at Königsberg on 31 March 1831.
