= Słobity =

- Village
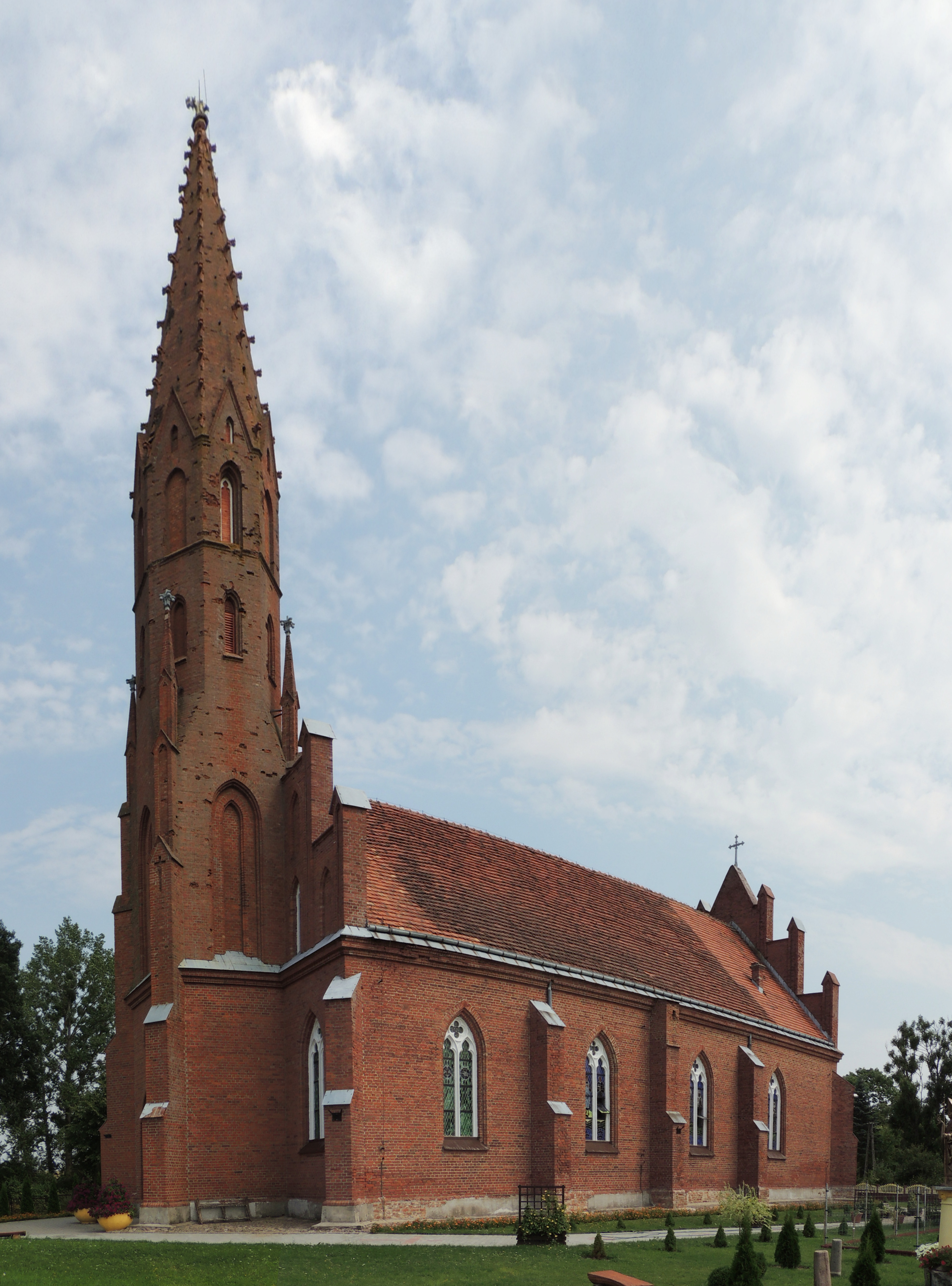
- Church of the Resurrection of Christ in Słobity

- Location within Poland
- Coordinates: 54°8′26″N 19°47′31″E
- Country: Poland
- Voivodeship: Warmian-Masurian
- County: Braniewo
- Gmina: Wilczęta

Population
  - Total: 549
- Time zone: UTC+1 (CET)
  - Summer (DST): UTC+2 (CEST)
- Postal code: 14-405
- Vehicle registration: NBR

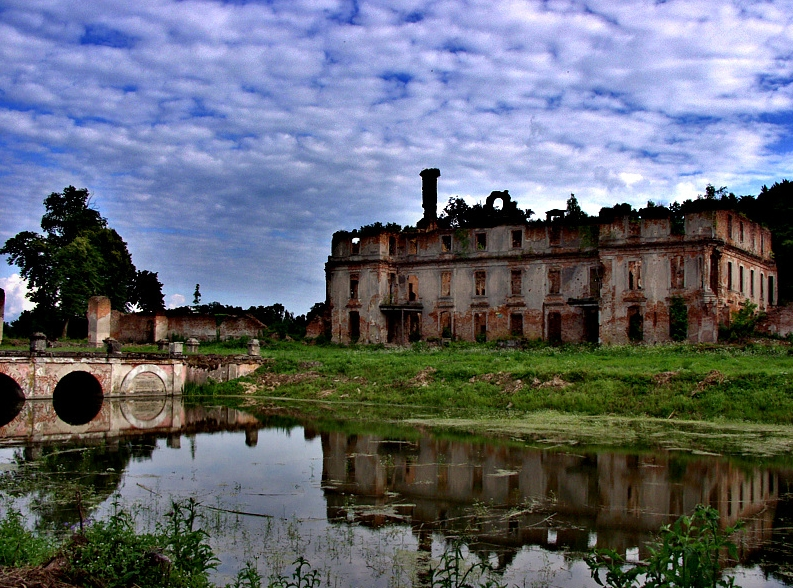
Ruins of palace Dohna-Schlobitten (2009)

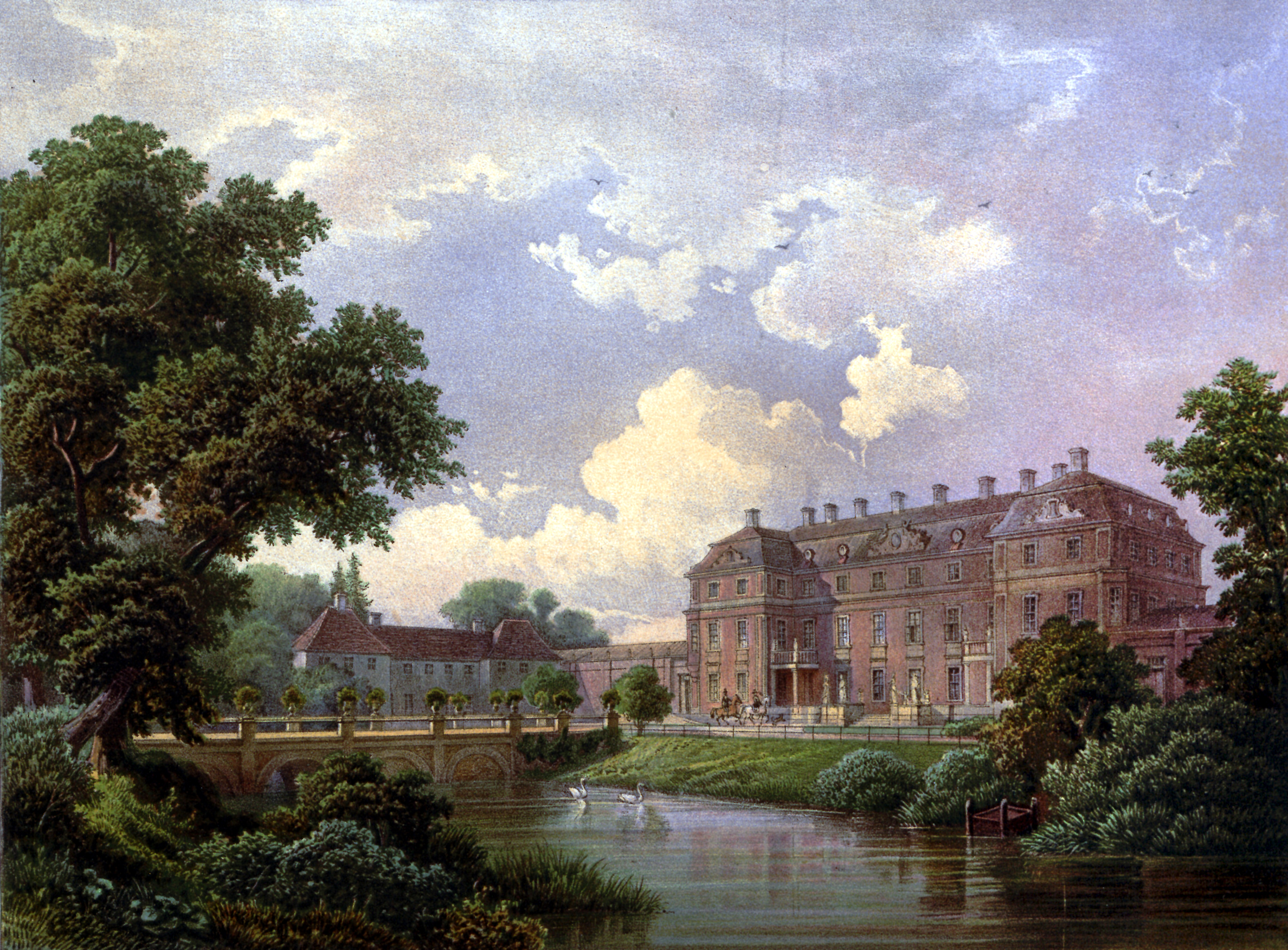
Palace Schlobitten around 1860, Edition Alexander Duncker

Słobity [swɔˈbitɨ] (de:Schlobitten) is a village in the administrative district of Gmina Wilczęta, within Braniewo County, Warmian-Masurian Voivodeship, in northern Poland.

== Overview ==
The village had been the property of the Dohna family since 1527. The last German owner of the palace Alexander zu Dohna renovated the Słobity Palace in 1944. In March 1945 the palace was burned down and the furnishings stolen by soldiers of the Red Army.

== Notable residents ==
- Alexander zu Dohna-Schlobitten (1661–1728), field marshal
- Friedrich Ferdinand Alexander zu Dohna-Schlobitten (1771–1831), Prussian politician
- Karl Friedrich Emil zu Dohna-Schlobitten (1784–1859), field marshal
- Heinrich Graf zu Dohna-Schlobitten (1882–1944), General and resistance fighter
- Alexander zu Dohna-Schlobitten (1899–1997), officer and businessman
