= Finckenstein Palace =

Baroque palace in Kamieniec, Poland

Coordinates: 53°46′05.51″N 19°22′20.39″E

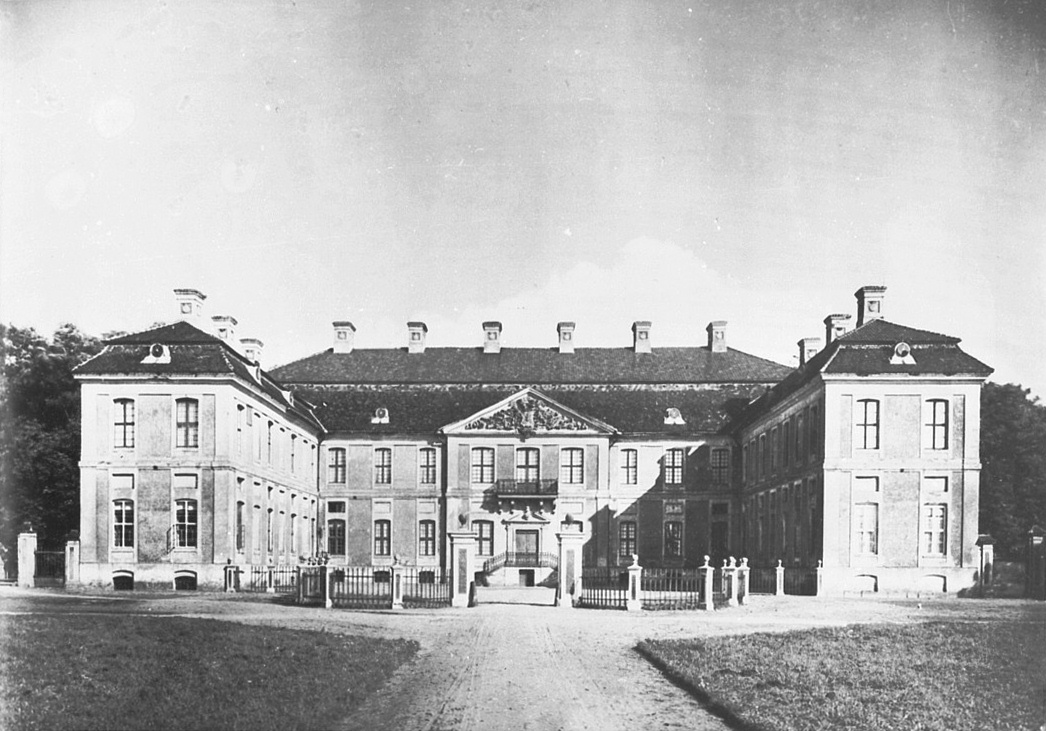
Photo of Schloss Finckenstein (1931)

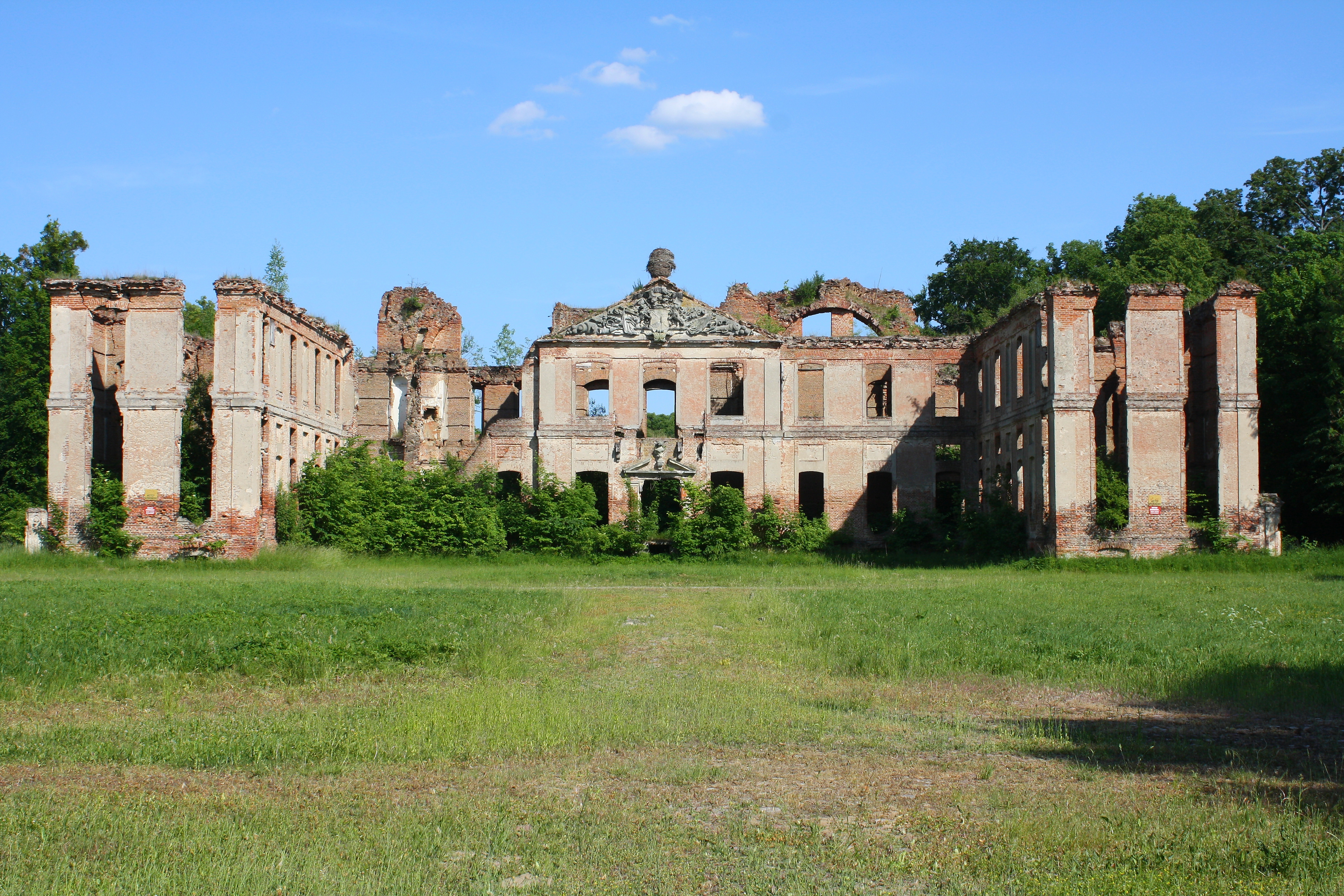
Ruins of the palace (2011)

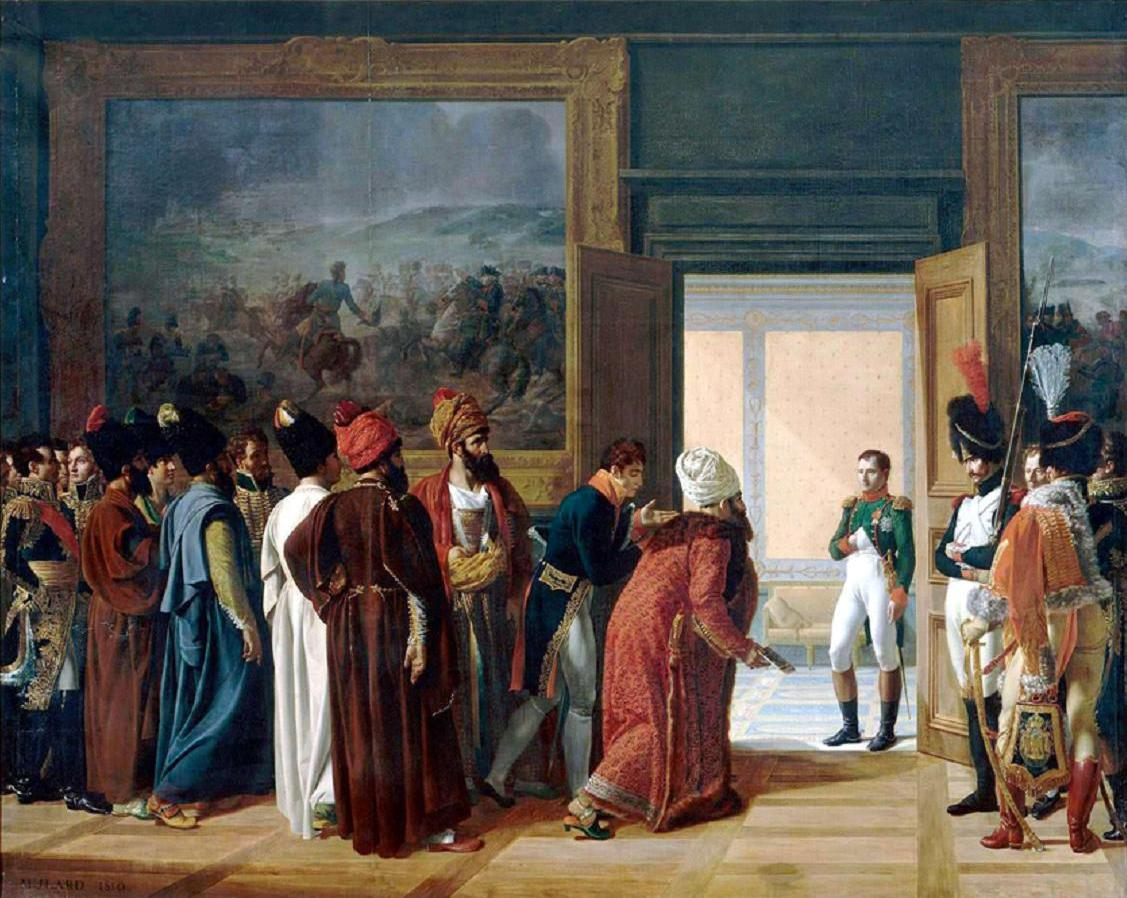
Persian Envoy Mirza Mohammad-Reza Qazvini meets with Napoleon to sign the Treaty of Finckenstein 27 April 1807 at Finckenstein Palace, by François Mulard.

Finckenstein Palace (German: Schloss Finckenstein; Polish: Pałac w Kamieńcu) is a ruined Baroque palace situated in the village of Kamieniec, about 25 mi. (40 km) south of Elbląg, in northern Poland. Formerly part of West Prussia, it was designed by the architect John von Collas and erected in the years 1716–1720 by Prussian Field Marshal, Marquess, and Count Albrecht Konrad Reinhold Finck von Finckenstein. It remained in the possession of the Finck von Finckenstein family until 1782. After that the Counts Dohna-Schlobitten lived in it until 1945. Red Army soldiers set the palace on fire January 22, 1945, during their conquest of Prussia in World War II. The last owner/resident was Alfred (1917–1988), son of Hermann Dohna-Finckenstein (1894–1942).

The palace became famous in 1807, when Napoleon made it his residence from April through June of that year. When he saw the palace for the first time, he said: Enfin un chateau ("Finally, a castle"). The Treaty of Finckenstein between France and Persia was signed here. Here, Napoleon met his Polish mistress Maria Walewska, with whom he lived in the palace. The Hollywood movie Conquest depicted the palace with Greta Garbo and Charles Boyer but was actually filmed in Monterey, California.

Palace ownership:

#	when owned	name	relation to previous owner	years owned
1	1720-1735	Albrecht Konrad Finck von Finckenstein (1660-1735)	-	15
2	1735-1741	Friedrich Wilhelm Finck von Finckenstein (1702-1741)	son	6
3	1741-1782	Friedrich Ludwig Finck von Finckenstein (1709-1785)	brother	41
4	1782-1825	Friedrich zu Dohna-Schlobitten (1741-1825)	son-in-law	43
5	1825-1831	Alexander zu Dohna-Schlobitten (1771-1831)	son	6
6	1831-1845	Wilhelm zu Dohna-Schlobitten (1773-1845)	brother	14
7	1845-1850	Fabian zu Dohna-Schlobitten (1781-1850)	brother	5
8	1850-1900	Rodrigo zu Dohna-Finckenstein (1815-1900)	son	50
9	1900-1912	Georg zu Dohna-Finckenstein (1850-1912)	nephew	12
10	1912-1929	Alfred zu Dohna-Finckenstein (1852-1929)	brother	17
11	1929-1942	Hermann zu Dohna-Finckenstein (1894-1942)	nephew	13
12	1942-1945	Alfred zu Dohna-Finckenstein (1917-1988)	son	3

== See also ==
- Kamieniec (Warmian-Masurian Voivodeship)
