= Kamieniec, Warmian-Masurian Voivodeship =

Kamieniec
- Village
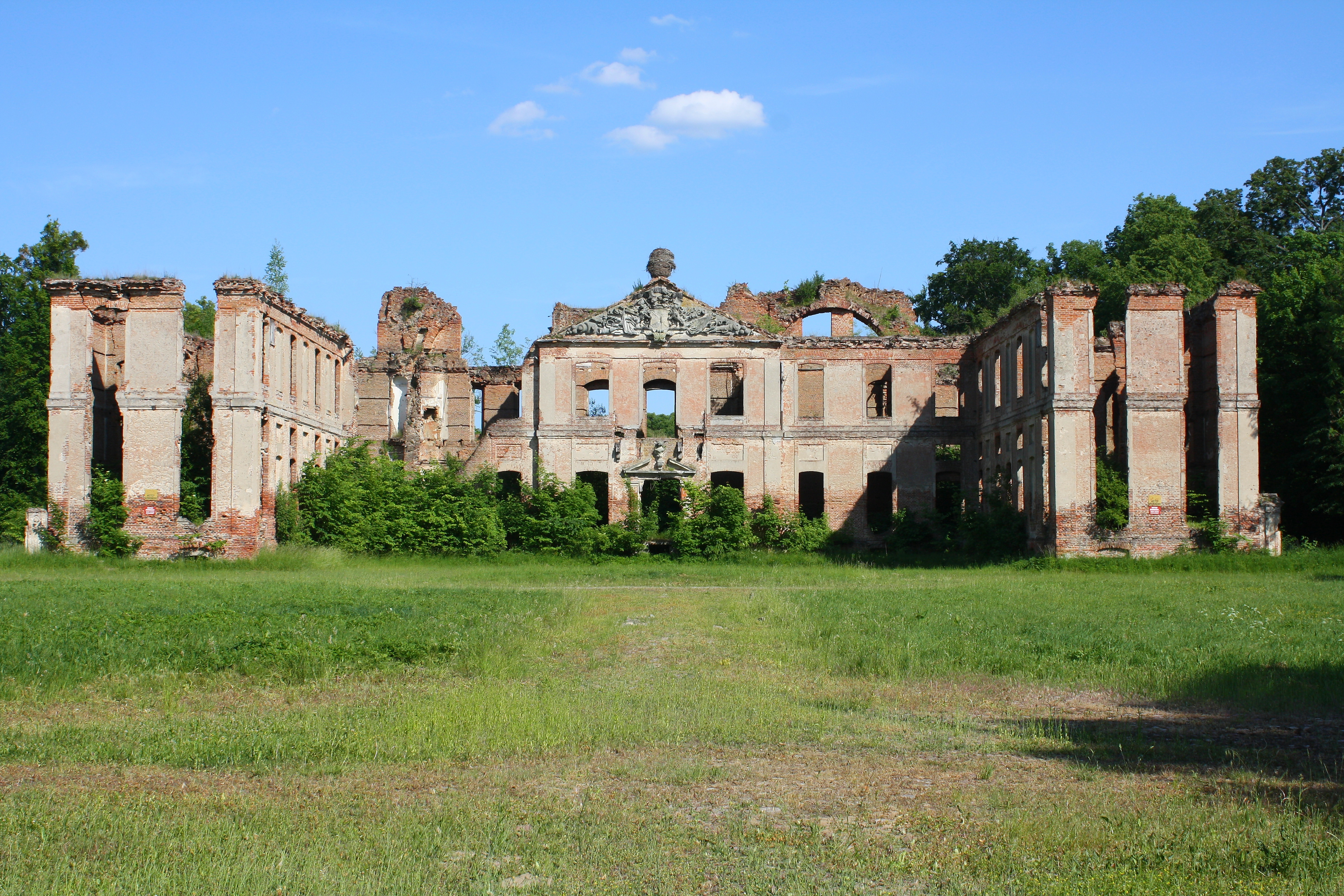
- Ruins of the palace in 2011

- Location within Poland
- Coordinates: 53°45′N 19°22′E
- Country: Poland
- Voivodeship: Warmian-Masurian
- County: Iława
- Gmina: Susz
- First mentioned: 1321
- Population: 430
- Time zone: UTC+1 (CET)
  - Summer (DST): UTC+2 (CEST)
- Vehicle registration: NIL

Kamieniec [kaˈmjɛɲɛt͡s] or Kamieniec Suski is a village in the administrative district of Gmina Susz, within Iława County, Warmian-Masurian Voivodeship, in northern Poland.

== History ==
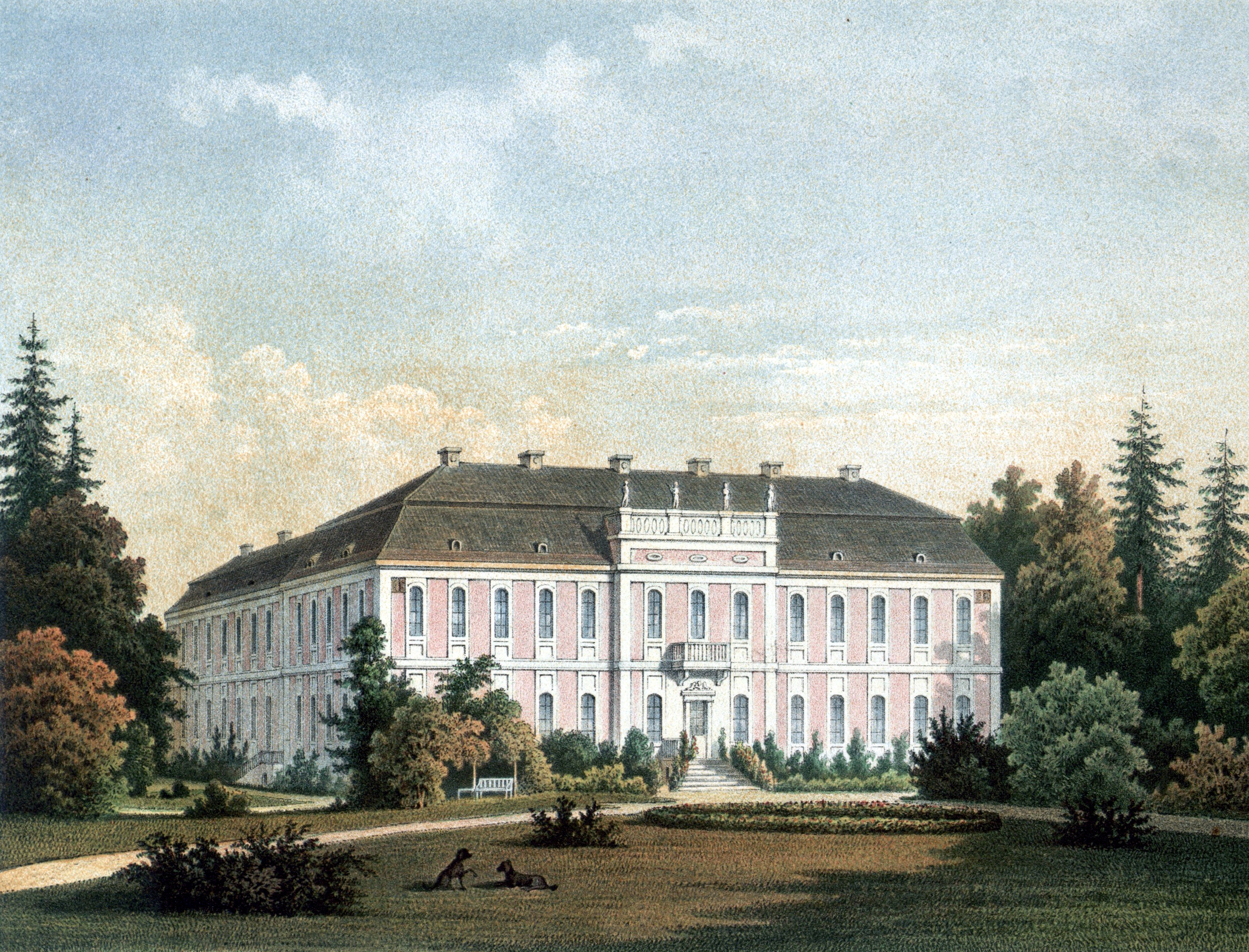
19th-century view of the palace. From the collection of Alexander Duncker

The oldest known mention of the village comes from 1321. In 1454 King Casimir IV Jagiellon incorporated the village and region to the Kingdom of Poland upon the request of the Prussian Confederation, and after the subsequent Thirteen Years’ War (1454–1466) it was part of Poland as a fief held by the State of the Teutonic Knights. From the 18th century it was part of the Kingdom of Prussia, and from 1871 to 1945 it was part of Germany. In 1807 Napoleon stayed at the local palace for several weeks with his mistress Maria Walewska. There, Napoleon signed a decree establishing the elite 1st Polish Light Cavalry Regiment of the Imperial Guard, and a Franco-Persian treaty. In the village are the ruins of the Finckenstein Palace, burned by the Soviets in 1945 during World War II. After the defeat of Nazi Germany in World War II, in 1945, the village became part of Poland.

== Notable residents ==
- Friedrich Ferdinand Alexander zu Dohna-Schlobitten (1771–1831), Prussian politician
