= Alexander zu Dohna-Schlobitten (1661–1728) =

Prussian field marshal and diplomat (1661–1728)

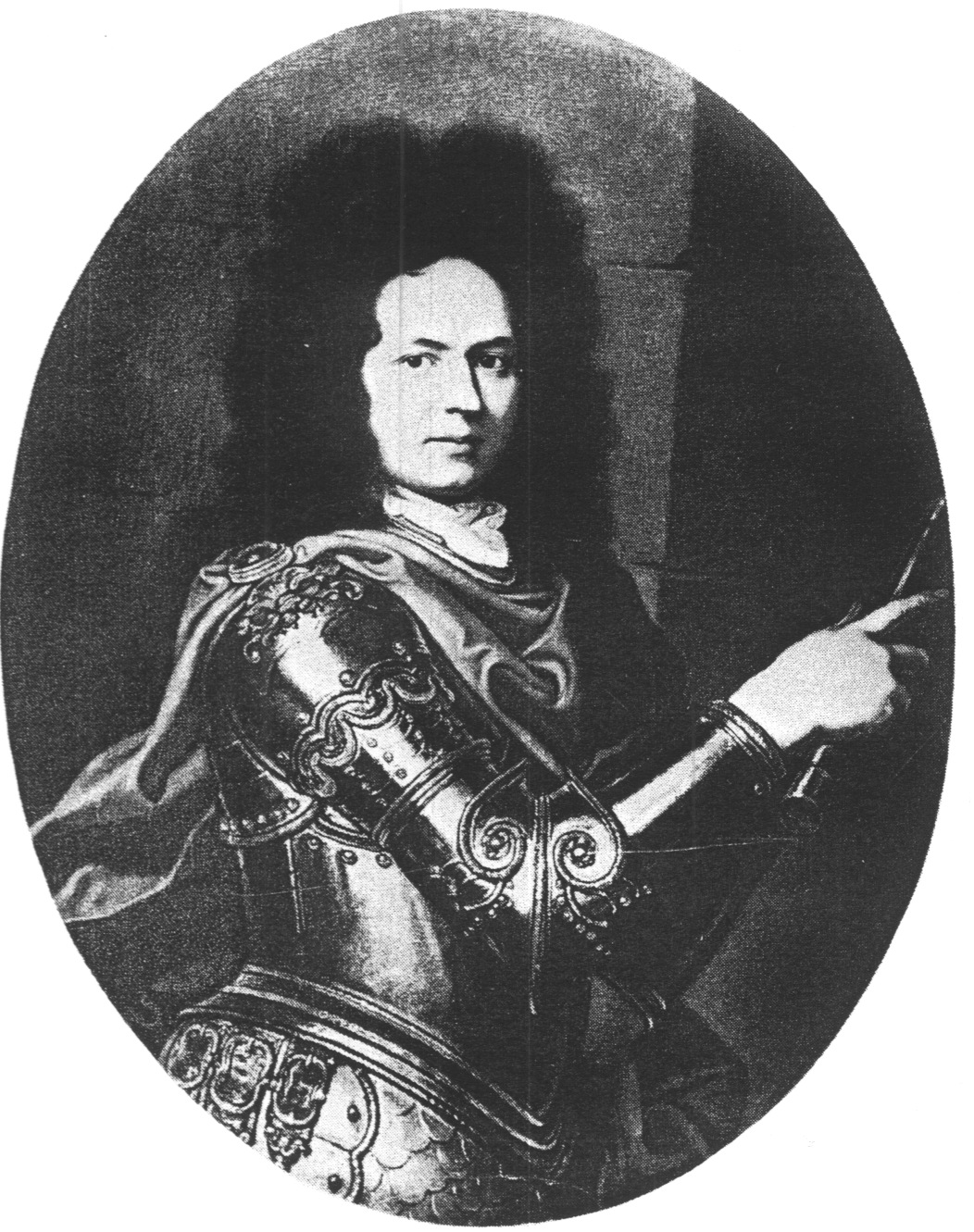
- Alexander zu Dohna-Schlobitten
- Born: 25 January 1661; Coppet, Vaud
- Died: 25 February 1728 (aged 67); Königsberg, Prussia
- Military career
- Allegiance: (Kingdom of Prussia) Prussia
- Service years: 1679-1728
- Rank: Field Marshal
- Awards: Order of the Black Eagle

Alexander Burggraf und Graf zu Dohna-Schlobitten (25 January 1661 – 25 February 1728) was a Prussian field marshal and diplomat.

Alexander zu Dohna was born at the Palace of Coppet in Coppet near Geneva to Frederick, Burgrave of Dohna (1621–1688), Governor of the Principality of Orange, and Espérance née du Puy de Montbrun. He and his brother Christoper were educated by Pierre Bayle.

Dohna joined the Prussian Army in 1679 and became an Amtshauptmann of Mohrungen and Liebstadt in East Prussia. He was promoted to an Oberst and Geheimer Rat on 31 December 1686 and served as an envoy of Friedrich III, elector of Brandenburg at the Polish Royal Court. In 1689/90 he fought against France in the Nine Years' War and was wounded in a battle at Bonn on 10 October 1689. Dohna became a major general on 9 October 1690 and Commander of an Infantry Regiment, which was named after him.

He served again as a Prussian diplomat at the Royal Swedish court and became the governor of Pillau on 11 April 1692. In 1693 Dohna fought again against France and became responsible for the education of the Crown Prince Friedrich Wilhelm in 1695 until 1704. In 1704 he came in conflict with Johann Kasimir Kolbe von Wartenberg and lost much of his influence at the Prussian Royal Court, but returned after Kolbe's dismissal. Dohna became the Chairman of the Royal Commission of Chamber- and Domain Affairs (Königliches Kammer- und Domänewesen) and the head of the District administration of Königsberg in 1712. Dohna was promoted to a General of the Infantry on 25 March 1713 and Generalfeldmarschall on 5 September 1713. He accompanied Frederick William I in the Siege of Stralsund (1711–1715).

Dohna married Emilie Luise née Gräfin zu Dohna-Carwinden (28 July 1661 – 2 April 1724) on 10 September 1684 and Johanna Sophie née Gräfin zu Dohna-Reichertswalde (27 August 1682 – 2 April 1735) on 26 December 1725. He had 14 children with his first wife.

1. Esperance (born and died 1685).
2. Amélie Louise (22 May 1686 – 23 September 1757), married firstly Count Otto Magnus of Dönhoff and secondly Count Frederick William of Schwerin.
3. Charlotte Sophie Eleonore (5 January 1688 – 1689), twin with Louise Charlotte.
4. Louise Charlotte (5 January 1688 – 25 May 1736), twin with Charlotte Sophie, married Count Frederick William of Wied-Neuwied.
5. Carl Simon (1689 – 1690).
6. Christiane Charlotte (1691 – 1696).
7. Alexander Aemilius (1692 – 1693).
8. Ursula Anna (17 November 1693 – 15 August 1737), married Count Ferdinand Christian of Lippe-Detmold.
9. Friedrich (1695 – 1705).
10. Carl Wilhelm (1696 – 1697).
11. Sophie Wilhelmine (8 July 1697 – 10 September 1754), married Frederick Louis, Bggf und Gf zu Dohna-Carwinden.
12. Albert Christoph (23 September 1698 – 13 May 1752), married firstly Amelie Elisabeth of Lippe-Detmold, secondly Dorothea Sophie of Solms-Braunfels and thirdly Henriette of Schleswig-Holstein-Sonderburg-Beck.
13. Johanna Charlotte (9 December 1699 – 12 November 1726), married Charles Florus, Bggf und Gf zu Dohna-Schlodien.
14. Alexander Aemilius (7 July 1704 – killed in action, 6 October 1745), married Sophie Charlotte of Schleswig-Holstein-Sonderburg-Beck.

Dohna was the first to add the name of his family estate Schlobitten to his name. He was the principal of the construction of Schlobitten Palace. He died in Königsberg.
