= Russo-Persian War (1804–1813) =

Fourth conflict of the Russo-Persian Wars

- Part of the Russo-Persian Wars, Russian conquest of the Caucasus and the Napoleonic Wars
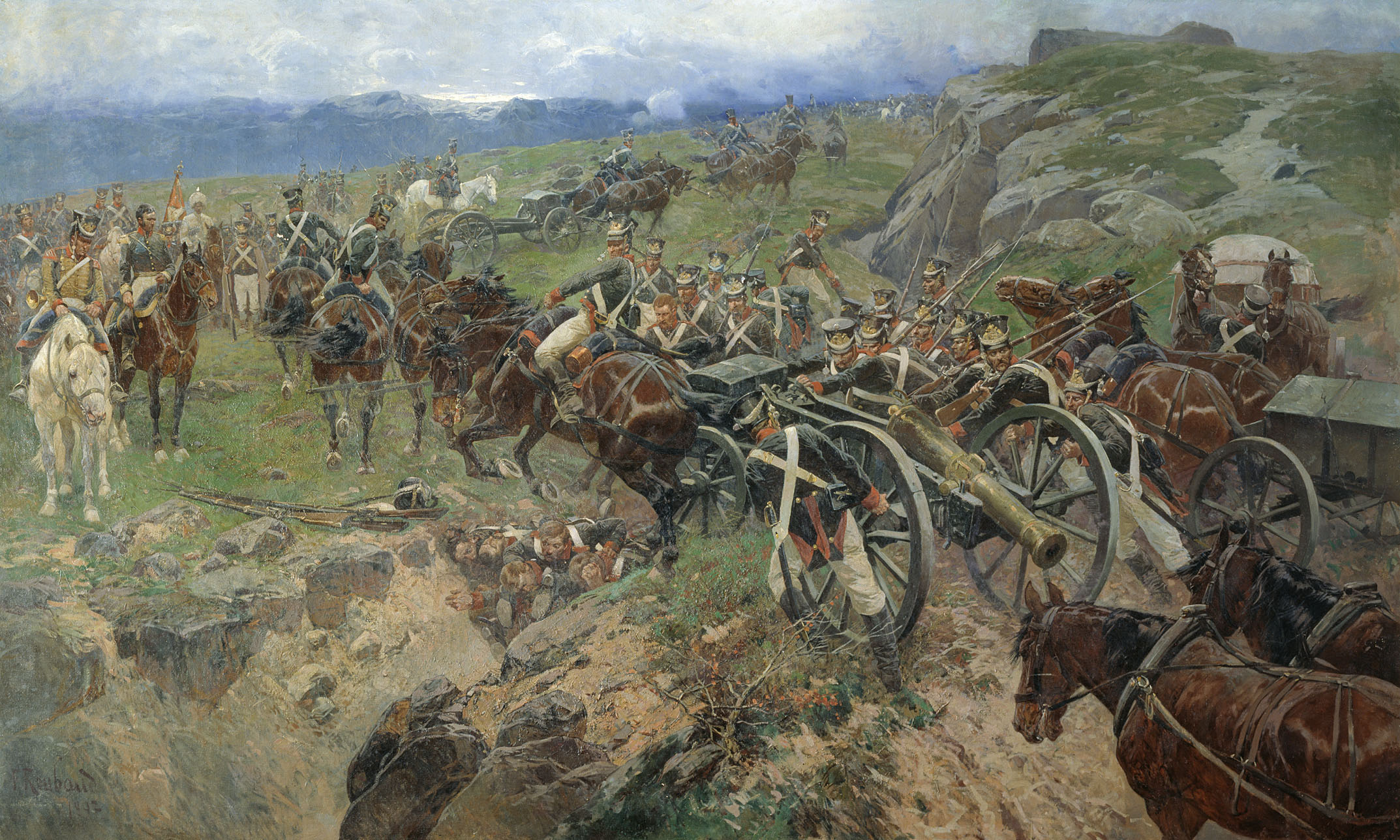
- This painting by Franz Roubaud illustrates an episode near the Askerna river where the Russians managed to repel attacks by a larger Persian army for two weeks. They made a "living bridge", so that two cannons could be transported over their bodies.
Date	22 June 1804 – 24 October 1813
Location	North Caucasus, South Caucasus, North Iran
Result	Russian victory Treaty of Gulistan
Territorial changes	Persia is forced to cede what is now Georgia, Southern Dagestan, most of Azerbaijan, and parts of northern Armenia to the Russian Empire.

Belligerents
Russian Empire	Qajar Iran; Ganja Khanate; Erivan Khanate

Commanders and leaders
Alexander I Ivan Gudovich; Pavel Tsitsianov X Pyotr Kotlyarevsky (WIA); Alexander Tormasov	Fath-Ali Shah; Abbas Mirza; Ali Mirza; Mohammad Khan; Hossein Sardar; Javad Khan †; Sadeq Qajar †

Strength
>20,000; 12 guns	180,000; 17 guns

Casualties and losses
8,317 casualties	Unknown

The Russo-Persian War of 1804–1813 (Note: Also called the Russo-Iranian War of 1804–1813.) was one of the many wars between the Iranian Empire and Imperial Russia, and, like many of their other conflicts, began as a territorial dispute. The new Persian king, Fath Ali Shah Qajar, wanted to consolidate the northernmost reaches of his kingdom—modern-day Georgia—which had been annexed by Tsar Paul I several years after the Russo-Persian War of 1796. Like his Persian counterpart, the Tsar Alexander I was also new to the throne and equally determined to control the disputed territories.

The war ended in 1813 with the Treaty of Gulistan which ceded the previously disputed territory of Georgia to Imperial Russia, and also the undisputed Iranian territories of Dagestan, most of what is modern Azerbaijan, and minor parts of Armenia.

== Origins ==
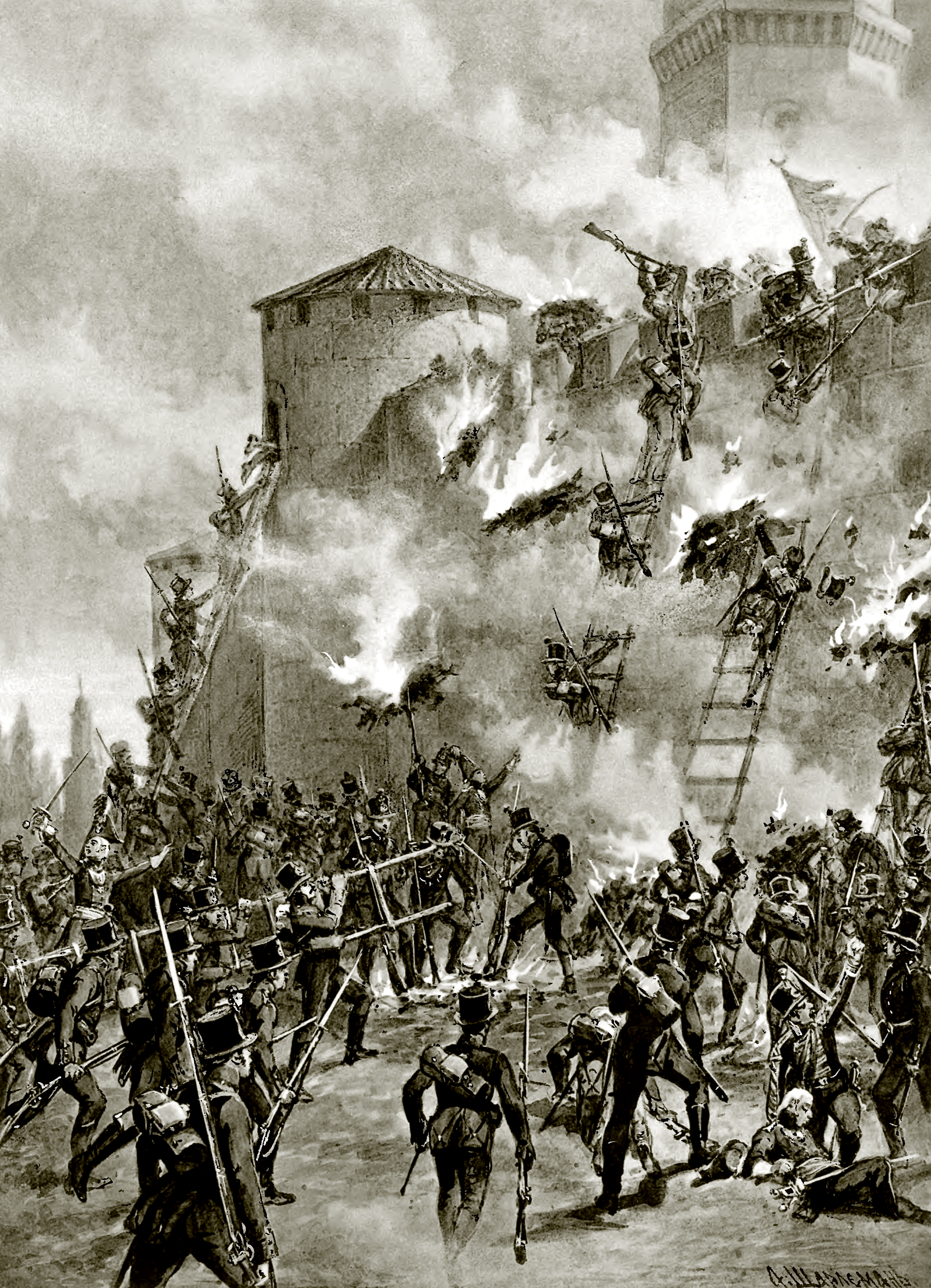
Illustration of the siege of Ganja Fortress in 1804 by Russian forces led by General Pavel Tsitsianov

The origins of the war can be traced back to the decision of Tsar Paul I to annex Eastern Georgia (Kartli-Kakheti) in December 1800. Earlier, in 1783, the Georgian king Heraclius II had signed the Treaty of Georgievsk with Russia, bringing his kingdom under Russian protection and swearing allegiance to Empress Catherine. While Russia had failed to protect Georgia against the assault of Agha Mohammad Khan in 1795, and an expedition against Iran was called off by Tsar Paul, in September 1799 Russia reasserted its protectorate over Georgia at the request of the Georgian king and stationed troops there. From the Iranian perspective, however, Georgia and all the South Caucasus remained integral Iranian territories, and Iran's new shah Fath-Ali Qajar could not accept their loss. Russia's annexation of Georgia in December 1800 was seen as a major threat to Iran's territorial integrity. After Tsar Paul's assassination on 11 March 1801, Tsar Alexander continued Russia's involvement in the region and sought to incorporate the khanates of the eastern Caucasus (Note: Iranian provinces that passed in and out of Iranian control over the course of the eighteenth century, but which were always viewed as Iranian territories.) into his empire. In 1803, the newly appointed governor of the Caucasus, Pavel Tsitsianov, attacked Ganja and captured its citadel on 15 January 1804. (Note: All dates old style (12 days behind the Gregorian calendar)) (Note: Tsitsianov's goal was to secure the territory between Georgia and the Caspian Sea. He used as justification the fact that the khans of Ganja had sometimes recognized Heraclius II's overlordship in the second half of the eighteenth century; he also referred to Georgian possession of Ganja and its vicinity during the reign of Queen Tamar (r. 1184–1213).) Ganja's governor, Javad Khan Qajar, was killed, and a large number of the inhabitants slaughtered. On the Iranian side, the capture of Shia Muslim territory was seen as an outright invasion that carried the risk of further losses and the imposition of foreign rule. It provoked a strong emotional reaction and the mobilization of Iran's clergy and educated elite. In fact, Tsitsianov intended to expand Russia's territories further southward into Iran, even beyond the Kur and Aras rivers, if possible. As Elton L. Daniel notes, Fath-Ali Shah saw the Russian threat to Iran's northwestern territories "not only as source of instability [...] but as a direct challenge to Qajar authority."

== Unequal forces ==
The Russians were unable to commit a large portion of their troops to the Caucasus region, because Alexander's attention was continually distracted by simultaneous wars with France, the Ottoman Empire, Sweden and Great Britain. Therefore, the Russians were forced to rely on superior technology, training, and strategy in the face of an overwhelming disparity in numbers. Some estimates put the Persian numerical advantage at five to one. Shah Fath Ali's heir, Abbas Mirza, tried to modernize the Persian army, seeking help from French experts through the Franco-Persian alliance, and then from British experts, in order to address the tactical disparity between the forces.

== Outbreak of war and first battles ==
Having captured Ganja, Tsitsianov turned to the Khanate of Yerevan (Erivan), the territory of which could serve as an invasion route to Tiflis from the south. He used a dispute over the election of the Armenian Catholicos (head of the Armenian Church) as a means to place pressure on the khan of Yerevan, Mohammad Khan Qajar. In the meantime, Fath-Ali Shah sent a letter to Tsitsianov requesting that he leave Tiflis and place Prince Alexander, who had earlier fled to Iran, on the Georgian throne. He warned Tsitsianov that he was raising a large army but stated that he wanted to avoid bloodshed. Tsitsianov sent back a hostile response, prompting the Shah to send Abbas Mirza toward the South Caucasus at the head of an army of 20,000 or 30,000. Abbas Mirza set out for Yerevan from Tabriz on 8 May 1804. Mohammad Khan of Yerevan, caught between the approaching Iranian army and the Russians, offered his submission to Tsitsianov, but the latter responded with more threats and harsh demands. Abbas Mirza arrived in Iranian Armenia and encamped on the Zangi (Hrazdan) River half a league from the city of Yerevan on June 7. Mohammad Khan, hoping for the arrival of the Russians, refused Abbas Mirza's demand to come out of the city and join him, and the two sides fired upon each other. Tsitsianov crossed into the Yerevan Khanate with an army of about 5,000 men, and Abbas Mirza abandoned the siege of Yerevan to confront him on June 24. Abbas Mirza's army, reinforced by local forces, numbered around 40,000.

The first battle between the armies of Tsitsianov and Abbas Mirza occurred at Echmiadzin (also known at the time as Üç-Kilisa), the center of the Armenian Church. Accounts of the battle differ on the details, with sources from each side claiming victory. After the main battle on July 3, mainly skirmishes occurred. Tsitsianov was running out of supplies and had heard that the khan of Yerevan had joined the Shah, so on July 8 he ordered his troops to march for Kanaker, a village in the vicinity of Yerevan, in order to besiege the city. Abbas Mirza moved to Kanaker to block the Russians' path, but the Russians successfully forced their way into the city and besieged its citadel. Abbas Mirza regrouped his forces and requested aid from the Shah, who arrived with reinforcements on July 27. Again, Iranian and Russian sources give differing details about the battles that occurred during the siege of Yerevan. The Iranians succeeded in disrupting Russian supply lines, and the Russians were not able to attempt an assault on the fortress. By late August, Tsitsianov's forces were running dangerously low on supplies. He requested provisions from Georgia, but the peasants there refused to provide the grain, and a rebellion occurred along the Georgian Military Road, temporarily blocking the passes through the Caucasus Mountains. In mid-September, Tsitsianov ended the siege and retreated towards Tiflis while being chased by the Iranian vanguard. He arrived back in Tiflis on October 16, having lost half of his men. (Note: Tsitsianov reported that 2,329 able-bodied men had made it back to Tiflis. According to Iranian sources, the Russians lost 4,000 men during the retreat, while the Iranians suffered 1,000–2,000 dead.)

Despite these ineffective forays, the Russians held the advantage for the majority of the war, due to superior troops and strategy. Russia's inability, however, to dedicate anything more than 10,000 troops to the campaign allowed the Persians to mount a fairly respectable resistance effort. The Persian troops were of a low grade, mostly irregular cavalry.

== War ==
Russo-Persian War 1804-1812
Blue=Georgia from Persia (square) or Turkey (circle)
Yellow=Khanate from Persia before or early in war
Black Diamond=Persian
Red=Turkish
A=Askeran, B=Shakh-Bulakh, S=Shamkir. Shusha is the yellow dot for Karabakh Khanate
Z=Aslanduz, E=Echmiadzin, M=Meghri.

In early 1805 the Shoragel sultanate was taken by the Russians. This was a small area at the junction of Georgia, the Yerevan Khanate, and Turkey and included the militarily important town of Gyumri. On 14 May, the Karabakh Khanate submitted to the Russians, and on 21 May the Shaki Khanate did the same. In response to the loss of Karabakh, Abbas Mirza occupied the Askeran Fortress at the mouth of a valley leading from the plain southwest to Shusha, the capital of Karabakh. The Russians responded by sending Koryagin to take Shahbulag Castle. Abbas Mirza marched north and besieged the place. On hearing of the approach of another army under Fath Ali, Koryagin slipped out at night and headed for Shusha. He was caught at the Askeran gorge but not defeated. More Russian troops relieved the blockade of Koryagin and Shusha. Seeing that the main Russian force had pushed far to the southeast, Abbas Mirza made a wide swing north and besieged Ganja. On 27 July, 600 Russian infantry routed his camp at Shamkir.

In September, a naval attack on Baku failed. In November, Tsitsianov marched east toward Baku, en route to accepting the submission of the Shirvan Khanate (27 December). On 8 February 1806, he was murdered while accepting the surrender of Baku. Russian honor was restored by Glazenap, who marched from north of the mountains and took Derbent, Quba, and Baku (technically Baku surrendered to Bulgakov). Ivan Gudovich replaced Tsitsianov as viceroy. In December, the Ottoman Empire declared war on Russia.

Troops were moved west to deal with the Turks, a truce was made and Nibolshin was left to guard the frontier. Fighting resumed in 1808 when Russia took Echmiadzin. Abbas Mirza was defeated south of Lake Shirvan; as a result, Nakhichevan, or some part of it, was occupied. In September 1808, Gudovich attacked Yerevan. The assault failed, withdrawal became necessary and 1,000 men, mostly sick and wounded, froze to death on the retreat. Escape was only possible because Nibolshin and Lissanevich defeated a "vast horde" of Persians. Gudovich resigned and was replaced by Alexander Tormasov. In 1809, Fath Ali was driven back from Gyumri and Abbas Mirza from Ganja. In 1810 Abbas Mirza tried to invade Karabakh but was defeated at Meghri on the Aras River.

In early 1812, Persia invaded Karabagh. They occupied Shahbulag Castle, which the Russians later recaptured. They attacked a Russian battalion at "Sultan-Buda" using European-style infantry and a few British officers. After a day of fighting the Russians surrendered. Russia responded to this unusual defeat by moving Pyotr Kotlyarevsky, the hero of Akhalkalaki, from the Turkish to the Persian front.

In the summer of 1812, just as Napoleon was preparing to invade Russia, the Russians made peace with the Ottoman Empire and Russian troops in Caucasia turned to Persia. On 19 October, Kotlyarevsky ignored the cautious Ritishchev's orders, crossed the Aras river and routed the Persians at the Battle of Aslanduz. He then crossed the snow-covered Mughan Plain and, after a five-day siege, stormed the newly-built fort of Lankaran. The Russians lost 1000 men, two-thirds of their force. Of the 4000-man Persian garrison, every survivor was bayonetted. Kotlyarevsky was found wounded among a heap of corpses. He was carried half-dead to Tiflis (now Tbilisi) and survived for 39 more years, unfit for further service. A victory at "Karabezouk" completed the discomfiture of the Persians (3 April 1813). News of Napoleon's defeat reached Persia in the spring of 1813. Peace negotiations were already underway and an armistice was made in October. In the Treaty of Gulistan, Persia recognized Russian possession of all the khanates it held and gave up all pretensions to Dagestan and Georgia. The border in the northern part of Talysh was left for later decision. Persia kept Meghri in southwest Karabakh, which the Russians had abandoned as unhealthy and inaccessible from the rest of Karabakh.

Thirteen years later, in another Russo-Persian War fought from 1826 to 1828, Persia tried to regain its territory. It was defeated and lost the khanates of Yerevan and Nakhichevan, roughly corresponding to modern Armenia.

== Anglo-French diplomacy in Persia ==
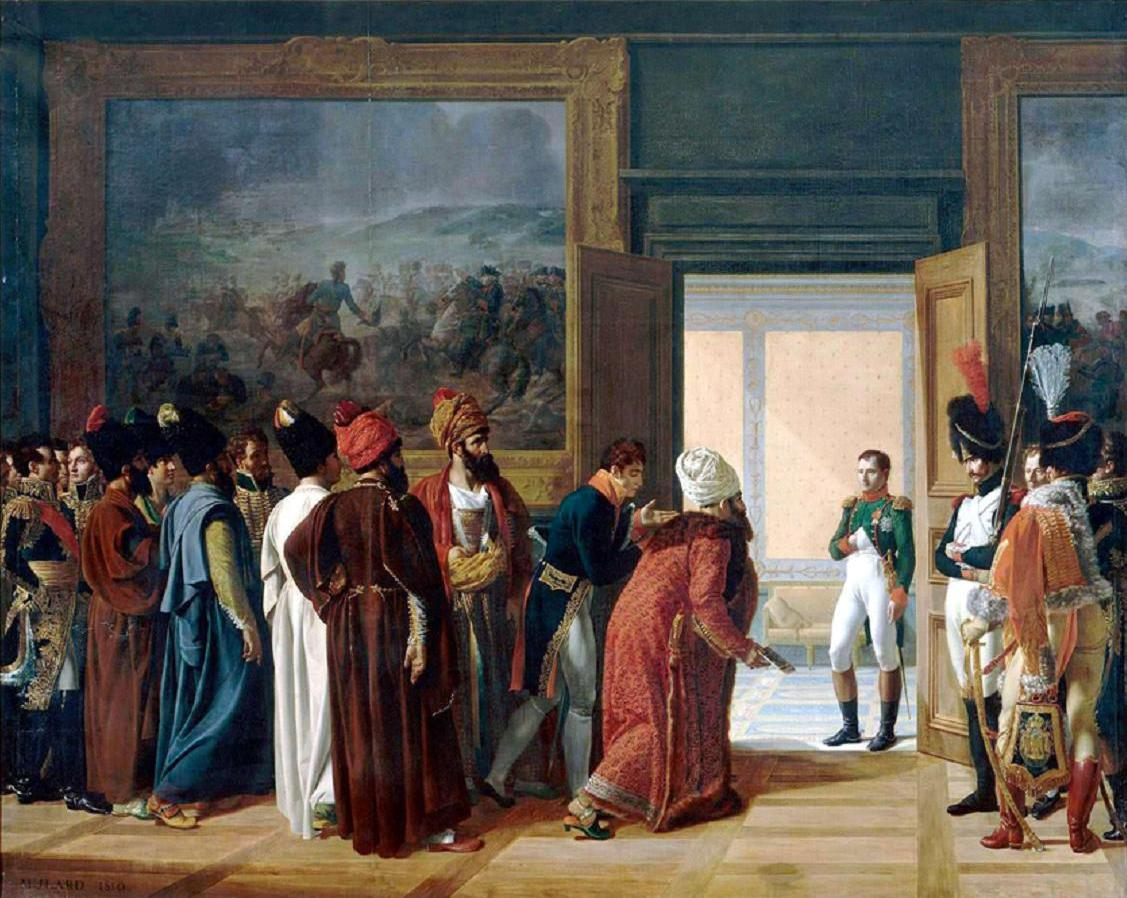
The Iranian Envoy Mirza Mohammad-Reza Qazvini meeting with Napoleon I at the Finckenstein Palace, 27 April 1807, to sign the Treaty of Finckenstein.

Although this Russo-Persian War was in many respects a continuation of a struggle for supremacy in Transcaucasia dating back to the time of Peter the Great and Nader Shah, it differed from earlier conflicts between Persia and Russia in that its course came to be affected as much by the diplomatic maneuvering of European powers during the Napoleonic era as by developments on the battlefield. Following the Russian occupation of the various khanates, Fath Ali Shah, strapped for cash and anxious to find an ally, had made a request for British support as early as December 1804. In 1805, however, Russia and Britain allied in the Third Coalition against France, which meant that Britain was not in a position to cultivate its Persian connection at Russian expense and felt it necessary to evade repeated requests from the shah for assistance. As the British ambassador to the Ottoman Empire, Charles Arbuthnot, put it in August 1806,

To please the Emperor [of Russia], we have thrown away all our influence in Persia

This opened the door for France to use Persia to threaten both Russian and British interests. Hoping to forge a tripartite alliance of France, the Ottoman Empire, and Persia, Napoleon sent various envoys to Persia, notably Pierre Amédée Jaubert and Claude Matthieu, Count Gardane, whose diplomatic efforts culminated in the Treaty of Finckenstein, signed on 4 May 1807, under which France recognized Persian claims to Georgia and promised assistance in training and equipping the Persian army. Only two months later, however, Napoleon and Alexander I agreed to an armistice and signed the Treaty of Tilsit (7 July 1807), which effectively rendered the French commitments to Persia untenable, although the French mission did continue to provide some military assistance and tried to mediate a settlement with Russia. The French efforts failed, prompting Gudovich to resume the Siege of Erevan in 1808.

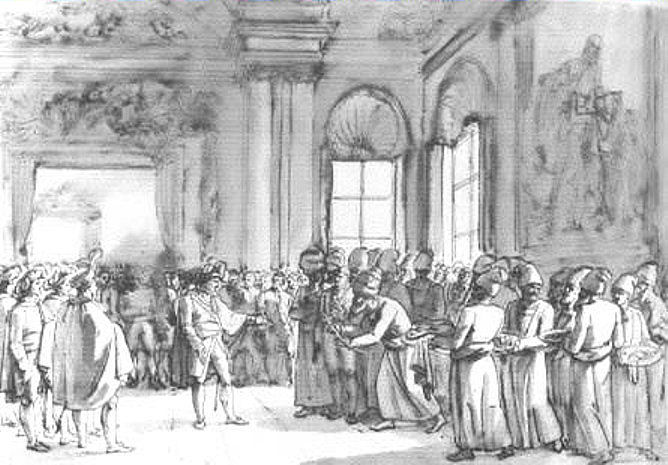
Askar Khan Afshar received by Napoleon I at Saint Cloud 4 September 1808 by Benjamin Zix

The rise of French influence in Persia, viewed as the prelude to an attack on India, had greatly alarmed the British, and the Franco-Russian rapprochement at Tilsit conveniently provided an opportunity for a now isolated Britain to resume its efforts in Persia, as reflected in the subsequent missions of John Malcolm (1807–8) and Harford Jones (1809). According to the preliminary treaty of Tehran arranged by Jones (15 March 1809), Britain agreed to train and equip 16,000 Persian infantry and pay a subsidy of £100,000 should Persia be invaded by a European power, or to mediate if that power should be at peace with Great Britain. Although Russia had been making peace overtures, and Jones had hoped the preliminary agreement would encourage a settlement, these developments strengthened Fath Ali Shah 's determination to continue the war. Anglo-Persian relations warmed even further with the visit of Abu’l-Hasan Khan to London in 1809 and his return to Persia with Gore Ouseley as ambassador and minister plenipotentiary in 1810. Under Ouseley's auspices, the preliminary treaty was converted into the Definitive Treaty of Friendship and Alliance in 1812, which confirmed the earlier promises of military assistance and increased the amount of the subsidy for that purpose to £150,000.

Then, in the third and final twist to this story, Napoleon invaded Russia in June 1812, making Russia and Britain allies once again. Britain, like France after Tilsit, was thus obliged to steer a course between antagonizing Russia and violating its commitments to Persia, with its best option being to broker a settlement of the conflict between the two. The Russians had been periodically interested in finding a negotiated settlement since the setbacks of 1805–6 and as recently as 1810, when Alexander Tormasov, who had replaced Gudovich as commander after his unsuccessful siege of Erevan, and Mirza Bozorg Qaem-magham had sought to arrange an armistice. Yet the Russians were unwilling to make serious concessions in order to end the war, and the Persians were also less than eager to settle since from their point of view the war was not going all that badly. Ouseley, however, realized the awkwardness of having Britain's resources deployed against its Russian ally and that the situation for Persia was likely to worsen once Russia was freed from the struggle with Napoleon. He was thus receptive to Russian requests to act as an intermediary and sought ways to pressure the Qajars into accepting a settlement. He proposed revisions to the Definitive Treaty, scaled back British military involvement (leaving two officers, Charles Christie and Lindesay Bethune, and some drill sergeants with the Persian army), and threatened to withhold payment of the subsidy promised to the Qajars.

In February 1812, Nikolay Rtishchev assumed command of the Russian forces and opened peace negotiations with the Persians. Ouseley and his representative at the talks, James Morier, acted as intermediaries and made various proposals to Rtishchev, but they were not accepted. In August, Abbas Mirza resumed hostilities and captured Lankaran. After news arrived that Napoleon had occupied Moscow, the negotiations were suspended (September 1812). Then, on 31 October 1812, while Ritischev was away in Tbilisi, the general Peter Kotliarevski launched a surprise night attack on the Persian encampment at Aslanduz, which resulted in the complete rout of the army of Abbas Mirza and the death of one of the British supporting officers (Christie). As it also became increasingly apparent that Napoleon's offensive in Russia had failed disastrously, the Russians were emboldened to pursue a more aggressive campaign in the Caucasus. In early 1813, the Persian fortress at Lankaran fell and its garrison was annihilated, enabling the Russians to occupy most of Talesh again. Although Fath Ali Shah and Abbas Mirza wanted to fight on after these setbacks, they eventually had to yield to Ouseley, who assured the Shah that either the Russians would make territorial concessions, or the British would continue the subsidy they had promised.

== 1813: Treaty of Gulistan ==
Russia fought on two frontiers: against the Ottomans between 1806 and 1812; and against the Persians from 1804 to 1813. Both frontiers were concluded via treaties: the Treaty of Bucharest in 1812 with the Ottoman Empire; and the Treaty of Gulistan in 1813 that lasted until 1826 when Russian troops, acting outside of the control of Tsar Nicholas I, occupied Mirak. Under the Gulistan treaty, Russia was acknowledged as the power in control of the South Caucasus; western and eastern Georgia and the Muslim khanates until Baku and Quba were placed under Russian administration.

== Assessment and aftermath ==
Although Russia was recognized as a dominant power over the Caucasus, the success of the Treaty of Gulistan was overshadowed by the threat of the Ottomans. The Treaty of Bucharest was in favor of the Ottoman Empire which had claimed the territories that Russia conquered during the war: Poti and Anapa, which were Black Sea port cities, as well as Akhalkalaki. Still, the conditions of sovereignty were comparatively stable in these years. In the complex political map of the South Caucasus, Russia had the means to control the region through defensive lines.

According to Firuz Kazemzadeh:

The defeat of Napoleon enabled Russia to allocate greater funds and resources to the Caucasus front. The difference between well-drilled, well-equipped, disciplined armies and the tribal levies of Abbas Mirza was decisive. At Aslanduz on the Aras, 2,260 Russians under General P. S. Kotlyarevsky fought a two-day battle with 30,000 Persians under Abbas Mirza, killing 1,200 enemy soldiers, and capturing 537 at a loss to themselves of only 127 dead and wounded. Though on occasion the Persians fought well, for instance at Lankaran, where the same Kotlyarevsky lost 950 of 1,500 men under his command and was himself permanently disabled, the war was obviously lost.

== Sources ==
- Atkin, Muriel (1980). Russia and Iran, 1780–1828. Minneapolis: University of Minnesota Press. ISBN 978-0-8166-0924-6.
- Bournoutian, George (2021). From the Kur to the Aras: A Military History of Russia's Move into the South Caucasus and the First Russo-Iranian War, 1801–1813. Leiden: Brill. ISBN 978-90-04-44515-4.
- Daniel, Elton L. (2001). "Golestān Treaty". In Yarshater, Ehsan (ed.). Encyclopædia Iranica (Online ed.). Encyclopædia Iranica Foundation.
- Dowling, Timothy C. (2014). Russia at War: From the Mongol Conquest to Afghanistan, Chechnya, and Beyond. Santa Barbara: ABC-Clio. ISBN 978-1-59884-948-6.
- Dubrovin, N. История войны и владычества русских на Кавказе, volumes 4–6. SPb, 1886–88.
- Goldstein, Erik (1992). Wars and Peace Treaties: 1816 to 1991. London: Routledge. ISBN 0-415-07822-9.
- Hambly, Gavin R. G. (1991). "Iran during the reigns of Fath 'Alī Shāh and Muhammad Shāh". In Avery, Peter; Hambly, Gavin; Melville, Charles (eds.). The Cambridge History of Iran. Vol. 7. Cambridge University Press. pp. 144–173. ISBN 978-0521200950.
- Kazemzadeh, Firuz (1991). "Iranian relations with Russia and the Soviet Union, to 1921". In Avery, Peter; Hambly, Gavin; Melville, Charles (eds.). The Cambridge History of Iran. Vol. 7. Cambridge University Press. pp. 314–349. ISBN 978-0521200950.
- King, Charles (2008). The Ghost of Freedom: A History of the Caucasus. Oxford University Press. ISBN 978-0-19-517775-6.
- Pourjavady, Reza (2023). "Russo-Iranian wars 1804-13 and 1826-8". Christian-Muslim Relations. A Bibliographical History Volume 20. Iran, Afghanistan and the Caucasus (1800-1914). Brill.
- Gisetti, Anton L. (1901). "Потери в период войн с Турцией и Персией" [Losses during the Wars with Turkey and Persia]. In Potto, Vasily A. (ed.). Сборник сведений о потерях Кавказских войск во время войн Кавказско-горской, персидских, турецких и в Закаспийском крае [Collection of information about the losses of the Caucasian troops during the wars with the Highlanders, Persians and Turks and in the Transcaspian region] (in Russian). Составлен по документам, хранящимся в Кавказских архивах (Compiled according to documents kept in the Caucasian Archives). Tiflis (modern Tbilisi): Типография Либермана.
