= Askar Khan Afshar =

Ambassador of Persia to France (1807-1810)

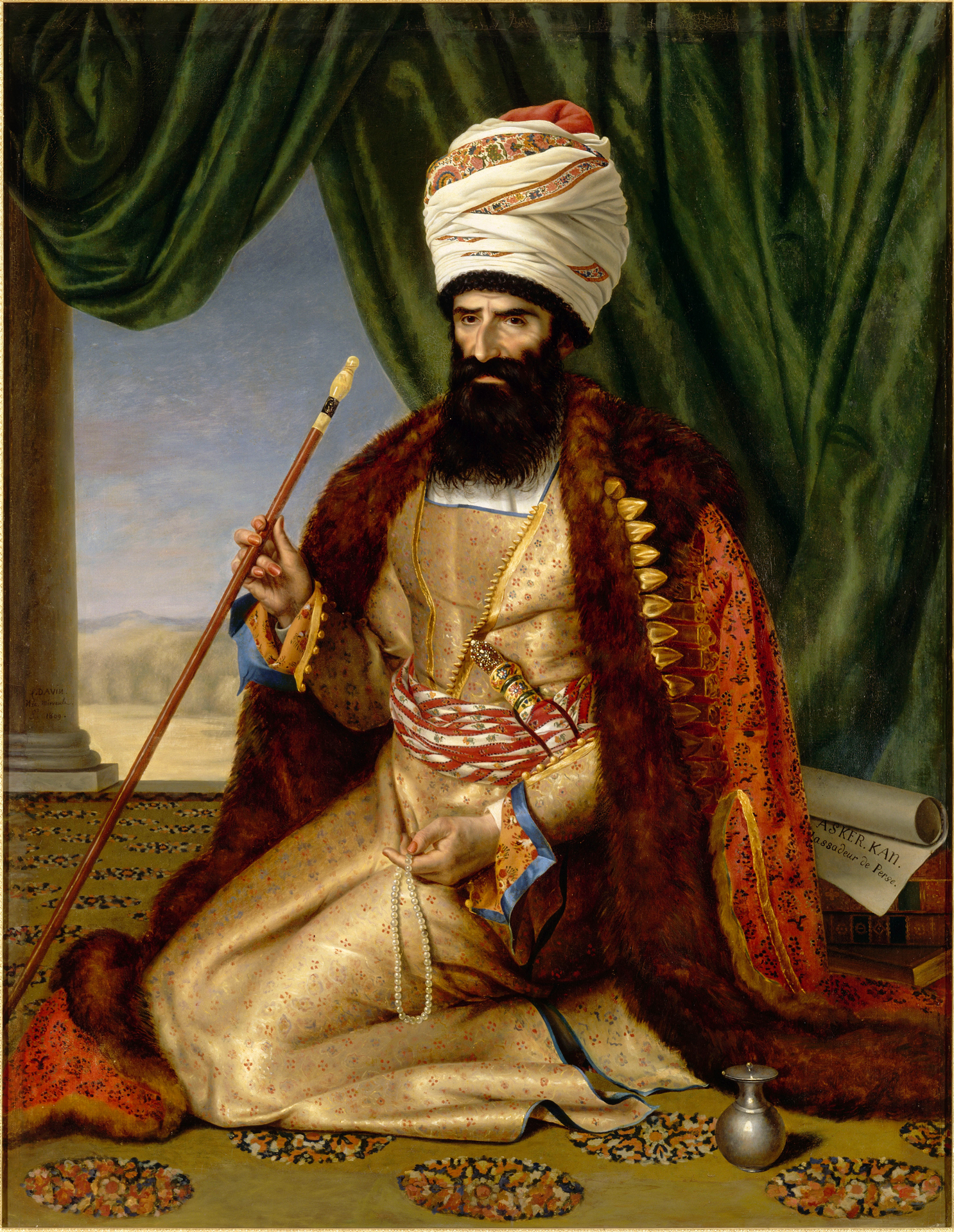
- Portrait by Césarine Davin-Mirvault, 1809

Ambassador of Iran to France
- In office 1808 – February 1810
- Monarch: Fath-Ali Shah Qajar

Personal details
- Died: 1833
- Occupation: Diplomat, politician

Askar Khan Afshar (Persian: عسکر خان افشار) was an Iranian diplomat and statesman who was sent to Paris and played a prominent role in the development of diplomatic relations between Qajar Iran and European powers in the early 19th century.

Askar Khan served as Fath-Ali Shah Qajar's ambassador to France during the brief Franco-Persian alliance. He arrived in Paris in July 1808 and was received by Napoleon at the Château de Saint-Cloud on 4 September, representing one of the most prominent diplomatic exchanges between Qajar Iran and Napoleonic France. During his residence in France, Askar Khan reported political and military developments to the Iranian court and maintained correspondence with senior Qajar officials. His mission coincided with the deterioration of Franco-Persian relations as France and Russia became allies, and he eventually left France in April 1810 after Iran shifted its diplomatic orientation toward Great Britain. In 1817, he served as mehmandar for the Russian embassy led by Aleksey Yermolov, accompanying the delegation during its journey through Iran. His diplomatic mission to Paris, together with the surviving correspondence and European portraits depicting him, has made him a notable figure in the history of Qajar Iran's relations with Europe.

== Career ==
=== Background ===
In September 1805 and June 1806, the French envoy Pierre Amédée Jaubert and the army officer Antoine Alexandre Romieu presented letters from Napoleon in Tehran. Persian response to these was delivered to Napoleon through Mirza Mohammad-Reza Qazvini in March 1807. An exchange of ministers followed, Count Gardane and Askar Khan, was initiated into Freemasonry in Paris soon afterwards, were appointed ministers plenipotentiary in April and August 1807 respectively. The Treaty of Finckenstein, a political alliance against Britain and Russia, in line with an envisaged commercial treaty, was signed on 4 May 1807.

=== Embassy to Paris ===
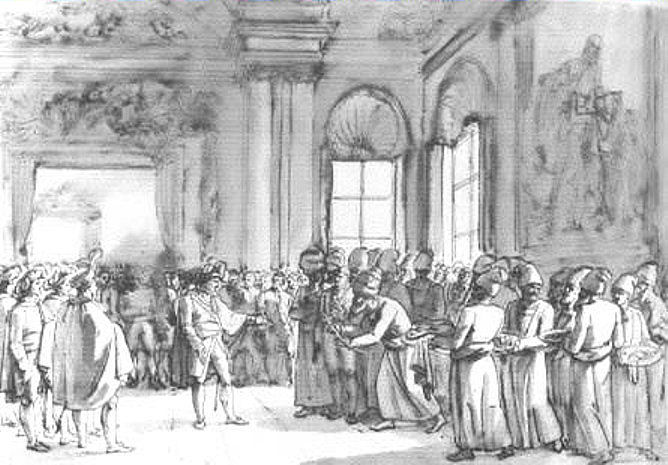
Askar Khan Afshar received by Napoleon I at Saint-Cloud, 4 September 1808, by Benjamin Zix.

But Napoleon's volte-face in signing Treaty of Tilsit (7 July 1807) and the delay in conveying instructions to Gardane, who had arrived at Tehran in December 1807, combined with some adroit diplomacy by the British in Persia rendered the Finkenstein treaty ineffective. At same time Askar Khan was sent to Paris. He arrived in Paris on 20 July 1808 and met Napoleon on 4 September 1808 at Château de Saint-Cloud. By next year on February 1809, Harford Jones-Brydges arrived in Tehran, with the announcement of arrival, Gardane, who was later blamed for this debacle, left Tehran, and Joseph Marie Jouannin, and later Félix Lajard, as French Chargé d'affaires, had to face British intrigues. In February 1810, Askar Khan Afshar was recalled from Paris, Georges Outrey, his interpreter in France, was assigned to accompany him to Tehran as a future Chargé d’affaires in capital, but Fath-Ali Shah refused to receive him. In 1811, official relations were broken off.
