= Anglo-Persian Treaty of 1801 =

1801 treaty between Great Britain and Persia

The Anglo-Persian Treaty of 1801 was signed between the British diplomat John Malcolm and the Shah of Persia Fath Ali Shah in 1801. The Treaty was proposed at the initiative of Great Britain in order to reinforce the Western border of British India, following the threat of French invasion during the Campaign of Egypt.

The treaty was also a response to the Russian conquest of the Kingdom of Kartli-Kakheti and annexation of Georgia in 1800–1801, which was a major concern of Qajar Iran and Britain (due to India).

The Treaty offered English support against Russia and trade advantages, and explicitly provided against French intervention in Persia:

"Should it ever happen that an army of the French nation attempts to settle on any of the islands or shores of Persia, a conjunct force shall be appointed by the two high contracted parties, to act in cooperation, to destroy it... If ever any of the great men of the French nation express a wish or desire to obtain a place of residence or dwelling on any of the islands or shores of the kingdom of Persia, so that they may there raise the standard of abode or settlement, such request or settlement shall not be consented to by the Persian Government"

— Excerpt from the Anglo-Persian Treaty of 1801

== See also ==
- Iran – United Kingdom relations
- Franco-Persian alliance
