= Nikolay Rtishchev =

Imperial Russian general

Nikolay Fedorovich Rtishchev
- Russian: Николай Федорович Ртищев
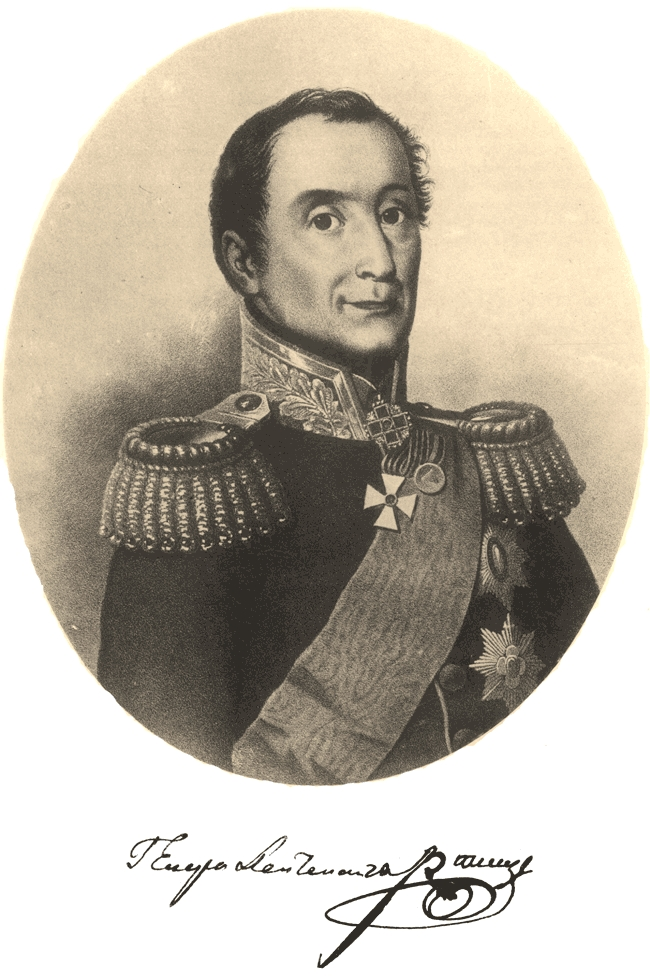
- Born: 1754
- Died: 20 January [O.S. 8 January] 1835 (aged 80–81)
- Military career
- Allegiance: Russian Empire
- Branch: Imperial Russian Army
- Service years: 1773–1816
- Rank: General of the Infantry
- Conflicts: Russo-Swedish War; Kościuszko Uprising; Russo-Persian War
- Awards: Gold Sword for Bravery; Order of St. Anna; Order of St. George; Order of St. Alexander of Neva; Order of the Lion and the Sun

Senator
- In office June 1817 – 1832
- Monarchs: Alexander I Nicholas I

Nikolay Fedorovich Rtishchev (Note: Last name also spelled as "Rtischev" or "Rtyschev".) (Russian: Никола́й Фёдорович Рти́щев; 1754 – 20 January [O.S. 8 January] 1835) was an Imperial Russian general who served as the Russian commander-in-chief in the Caucasus between 1812 and 1816. He is noted for being the Russian signatory to the Treaty of Gulistan, which brought an end to the Russo-Persian War of 1804–1813.

== Biography ==
Nikolay Rtishchev was born into a Russian family with an ancient lineage. After having finished education at the Infantry Cadet Corps, he started serving as a lieutenant of the regular army on 27 July 1773, and became adjutant to General Field Marshal Zakhar Chernyshev on 11 October. From this point on, Rtishchev would rapidly rise through the military ranks. He became second Major of the 2nd Grenadier Regiment about six years later, on 11 October 1779, and ended his career as adjutant to Chernyshev on 15 September 1784, when he became colonel (polkovnik) in the Navaginsk Infantry Regiment. On 2 May 1789, he became brigadier in the Saint Petersburg Brigadier Regiment. Rtishchev served in the Russo-Swedish War of 1788–1790, and for his merits, he earned the Gold Sword for Bravery. On 12 January 1793, he was promoted to major general and subsequently served in Poland where the Kościuszko Uprising was taking place. In 1798, he became a lieutenant general, commandant of Astrakhan, and on 5 April 1798, the head of the Astrakhan Garrison Regiment. His service in Astrakhan was very short lived however, for he retired from that duty later that same year, and returned to the main army on 15 April 1806. On 9 October 1809, Rtishchev took command of the 16th Division, and gained the Order of St. Anna (1st class). He took part in the campaigns in the Danubian Principalities between 1807 and 1809. On 27 May 1809 he took command of the 25th Division and participated against Austria later in that year. For his efforts during the campaign, he received the Order of St. George (4th class) on 8 December 1810.

On 19 July 1811, he became the commander-in-chief of the Russian forces on the Caucasian Line. The following year, he was promoted to Russian commander-in-chief in the Caucasus, a position otherwise known as head of the Caucasus Viceroyalty. Rtishchev took effective measures against the mountaineers in parts of Dagestan, as well as in recently obtained Kartli, Kakheti, and the mountainous regions of Georgia. In 1812–1813, during the Russo-Persian War of 1804–1813, he successfully managed to repulse the Iranian armies in what is now northern Armenia and southern Georgia. In August 1812, Rtishchev went from Tiflis (Tbilisi) to the Persian frontier and through the mediation of the British envoy Gore Ouseley, entered into negotiations, but the conditions proposed by the Iranian commander-in-chief Abbas Mirza were not accepted by the Russian government, and therefore Rtishchev returned to Tiflis. However, when General Pyotr Kotlyarevsky successfully captured the Persian town of Lankaran in early 1813, it forced the Persians to accept the demeaning and highly disadvantageous conditions which Russia was requesting. On 22 October 1813 Rtishchev left Tiflis for Karabakh, where, at the village of Gulistan Russia and Iran met to sign the notorious Treaty of Gulistan, which was signed two days later on 24 October 1813, once again with the mediation of Gore Ouseley. The treaty, with Rtishchev as the Russian signatory, ratified for the irrevocable cession of swaths of Iran's Caucasus territories, comprising present-day eastern Georgia, most of the Republic of Azerbaijan, and southern Dagestan to Russia.

For his successful military and diplomatic efforts, Rtishchev was promoted to General of the Infantry in 1813, the same year the war with Persia ended, and received the Order of St. Alexander of Neva on 12 December 1812 and the Persian Order of the Lion and the Sun. Rtishchev resigned from his position on 21 April 1816 and was replaced by Aleksey Yermolov. In June 1817 he was appointed to the Russian senate, where he served as senator for fifteen years. He died on 20 January 1835.

== Sources ==
- Floor, Willem M.; Javadi, Hasan (2009). The heavenly rose-garden: a history of Shirvan & Daghestan, by Abbas Qoli Aqa Bakikhanov. Mage Publishers. p. xii. ISBN 978-1933823270.
- Mikaberidze, Alexander (2005). Russian Officer Corps of the Revolutionary and Napoleonic Wars. Savas Beatie. ISBN 978-1611210026.
- Краткие биографии деятелей Кавказа за время с конца прошлого столетия до середины настоящего. — Кавказский календарь на 1889 год. — Tiflis, 1888 (in Russian)
- Кавказ и Закавказье за время управления генерала от инфантерии Н. Ф. Ртищева. — Акты Кавказской Археографической Комиссии. т. V (in Russian)
- Список главных деятелей на Кавказе. — Акты Кавказской Археографической Комиссии. т. IX (in Russian)
- Главноначальствующие на Кавказе. Ртищев Николай Фёдорович. (in Russian)
