= Franco-Persian alliance =

Short-lived alliance between the French Empire and Qajar Persia (1807– 1809)

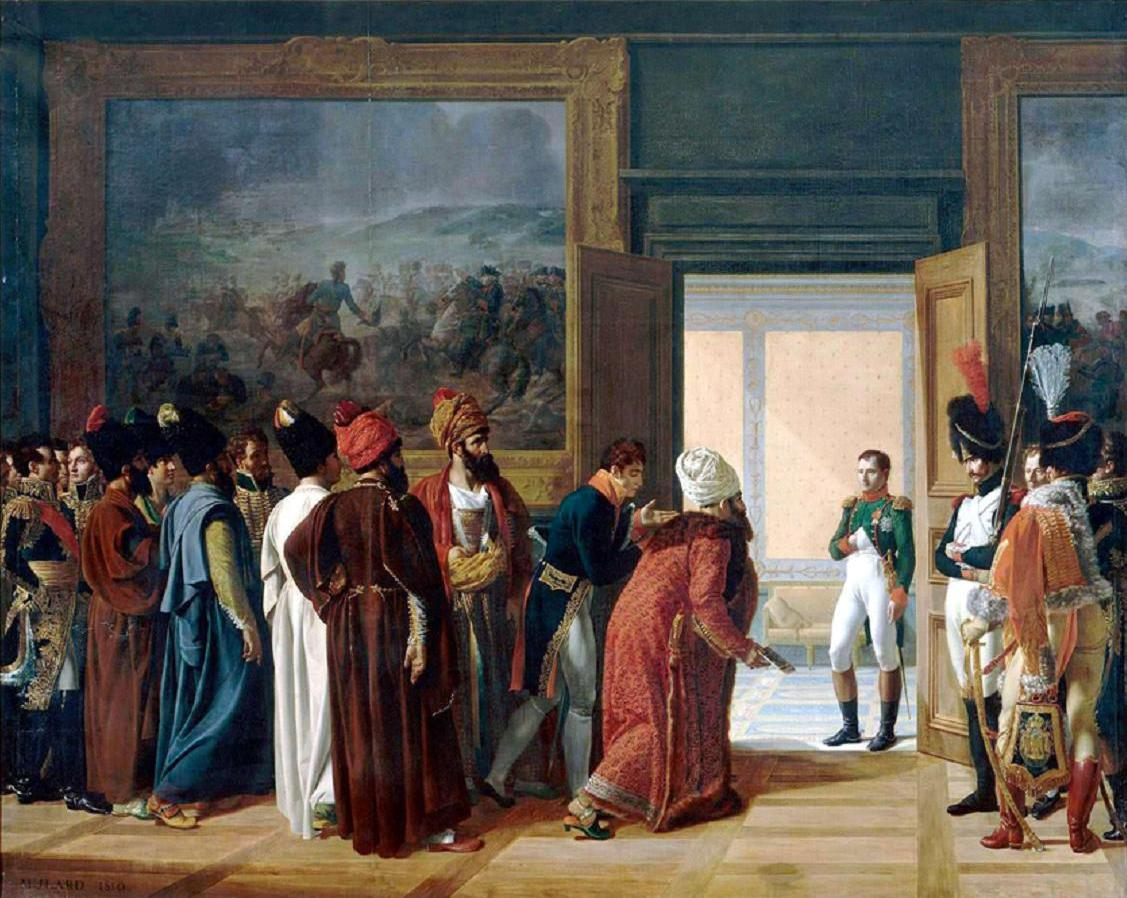
The Iranian Envoy Mirza Mohammad-Reza Qazvini meeting with Napoleon I at the Finckenstein Palace, 27 April 1807, to sign the Treaty of Finckenstein. François Mulard.

A Franco-Persian alliance or Franco-Iranian alliance, was formed for a short period between the French Empire of Napoleon I and Fath Ali Shah of Iran against Russia and Great Britain between 1807 and 1809. The alliance was part of a plan to gather extra aid against Russia and by Persia's help, having another front on Russia's southern borders, namely the Caucasus region. The alliance unravelled when France finally allied with Russia and turned its focus to European campaigns.

== Background ==
Due to the traditional friendly relations of France with the Ottoman Empire formalized by a long-standing Franco-Ottoman alliance, the relations of France with Iran had long been minimal. Instead, a Habsburg-Persian alliance had developed during the 16th century, and when Persian embassies visited Europe with the Persian embassy to Europe (1599–1602) and the Persian embassy to Europe (1609–1615), they pointedly avoided France.

=== First rapprochement ===
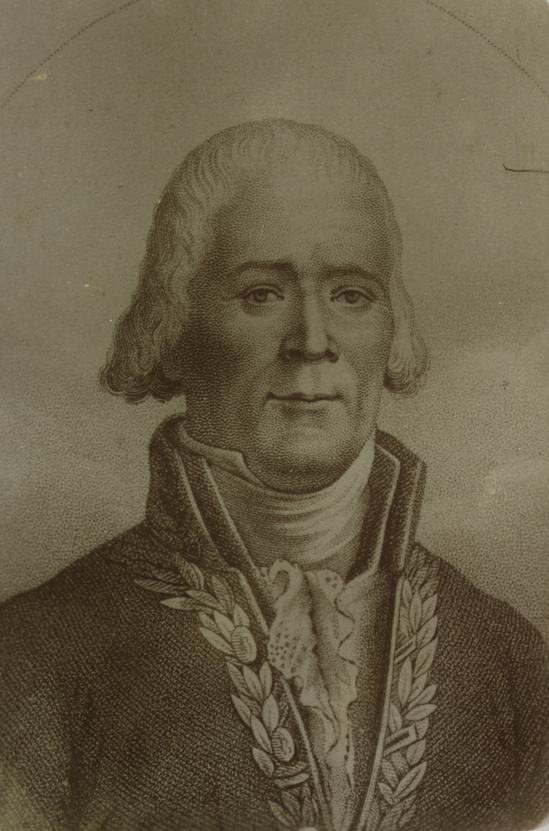
In 1796, Guillaume Antoine Olivier (depicted) and Jean-Guillaume Bruguières visited Iran in an attempt to establish an alliance, but in vain.

Later however, France developed relations with Iran and signed treaties in 1708 and 1715 with the visit of an Iranian embassy to Louis XIV, but these relations ceased in 1722 with the fall of the Safavid dynasty and the invasion of Iran by the Afghans.

Attempts to resume contact were made following the French Revolution, as France was in conflict with Russia and wished to find an ally against that country. In 1796, two scientists, Jean-Guillaume Bruguières and Guillaume-Antoine Olivier, were sent to Iran by the Directoire, but were unsuccessful in obtaining an agreement.

Soon however, with the advent of Napoleon I, France adopted a strongly expansionist policy in the Mediterranean and the Near East. Following the Treaty of Campo Formio in 1797, France acquired possessions in the Mediterranean such as the Ionian Islands as well as former Venetian bases on the coast of Albania and Greece, geographically close to the Middle-East.

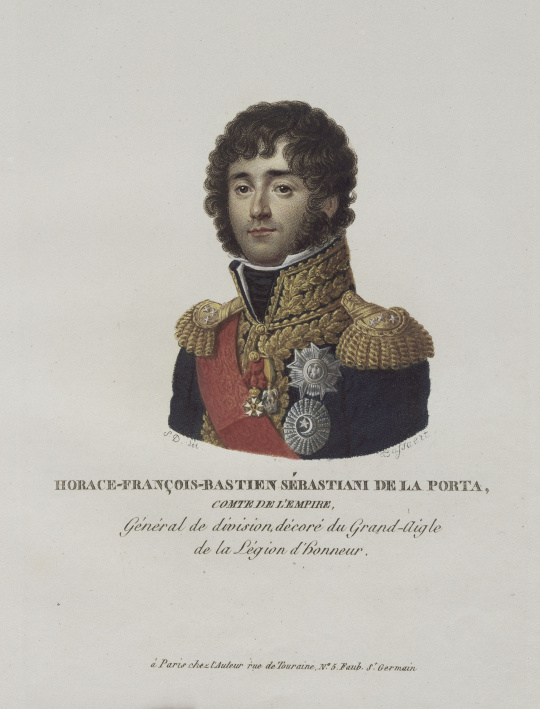
The French General Horace Sebastiani negotiated a Franco-Ottoman alliance with Selim III.

Napoleon Bonaparte launched the French Invasion of Egypt in 1798 and fought against the Ottoman and British Empires to establish a French presence in the Middle East, with the ultimate dream of linking with a Muslim enemy of the British in India, Tipu Sultan. Napoleon assured the Directoire that "as soon as he had conquered Egypt, he will establish relations with the Indian princes and, together with them, attack the English in their possessions." According to a 13 February 1798 report by Talleyrand: "Having occupied and fortified Egypt, we shall send a force of 15,000 men from Suez to India, to join the forces of Tipu-Sahib and drive away the English."

Napoleon was initially defeated by the Ottoman Empire and Britain at the Siege of Acre in 1799, and at the Battle of Abukir in 1801; by 1802, the French were completely vanquished in the Middle East.

In order to reinforce the Western border of British India, the diplomat John Malcolm was sent to Iran to sign the Anglo-Persian Treaty of 1801. The Treaty offered English support against Russia and trade advantages, and explicitly provided against French intervention in Iran:

Should it ever happen that an army of the French nation attempts to settle on any of the islands or shores of Persia, a conjunct force shall be appointed by the two high contracted parties, to act in cooperation, to destroy it... If ever any of the great men of the French nation express a wish or desire to obtain a place of residence or dwelling on any of the islands or shores of the kingdom of Persia, so that they may there raise the standard of abode or settlement, such request or settlement shall not be consented to by the Persian Government

— Anglo-Persian Treaty of 1801

Soon however, from 1803, Napoleon went to great lengths to try to convince the Ottoman Empire to fight against Russia in the Balkans and join his anti-Russian coalition. Napoleon sent General Horace Sebastiani as envoy extraordinary, promising to help the Ottoman Empire recover lost territories.

In February 1806, following Napoleon's remarkable victory in the December 1805 Battle of Austerlitz and the ensuing dismemberment of the Habsburg Empire, Selim III finally recognized Napoleon as Emperor, formally opting for an alliance with France "our sincere and natural ally", and war with Russia and Britain.

== Iranian alliance ==
=== Napoleon's motivation ===
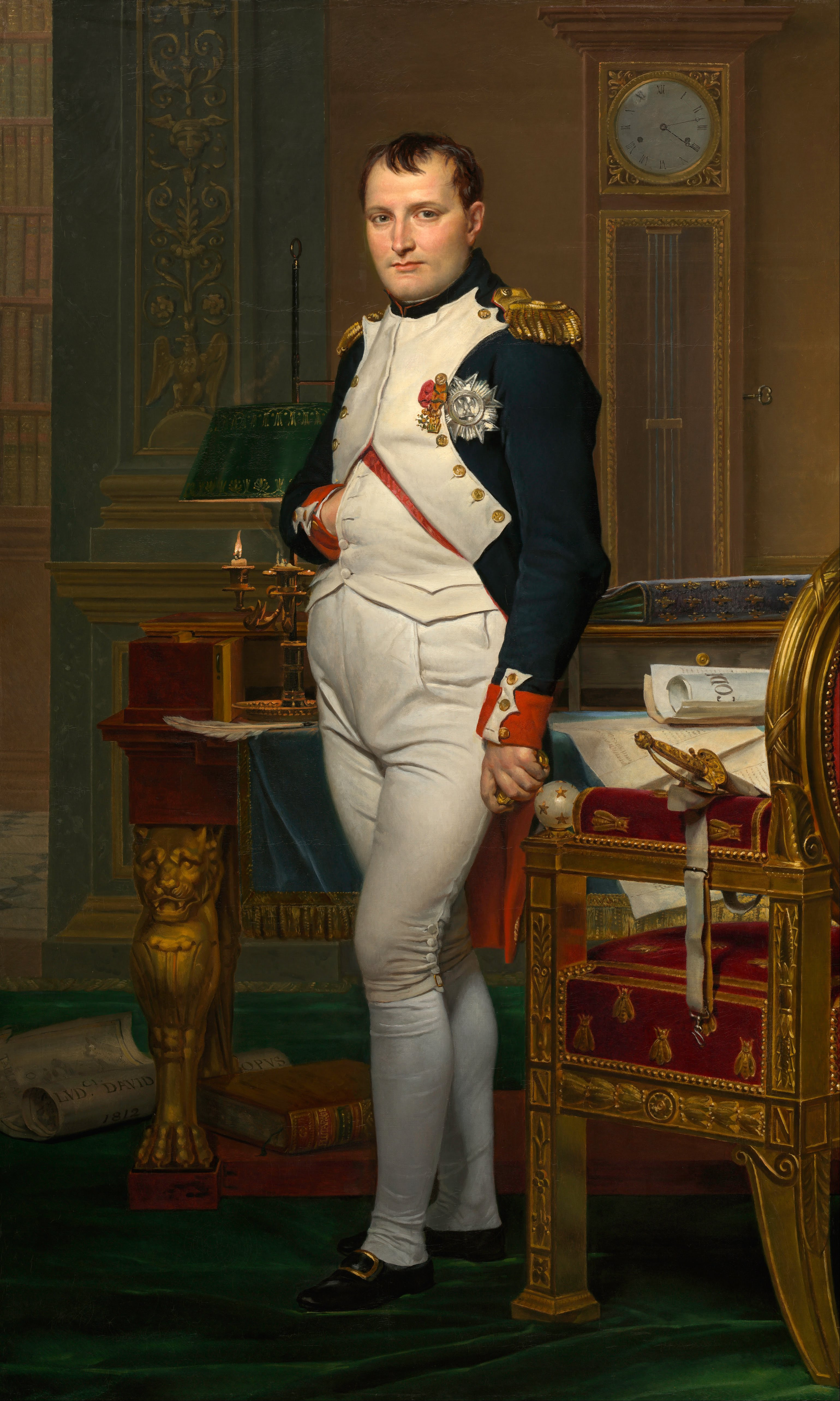
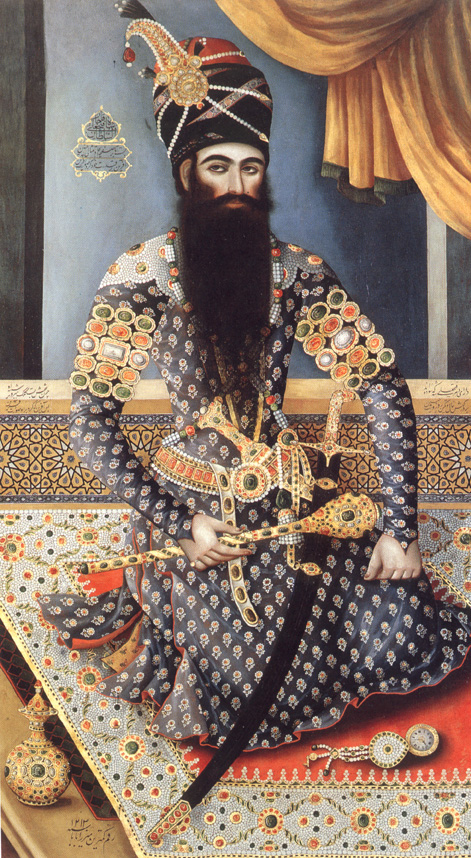
Left: Napoleon I, the ruler of France, in 1812. Right: Fath Ali Shah, the ruler of Persia, 1813.
The two rulers formed an alliance from 1807 to 1809.

In his grand scheme to reach India (the "India Expedition"), the next step for Napoleon was now to develop an alliance with the Persian Empire. Early 1805, Napoléon sent one of his officers Amédée Jaubert on a mission to Persia. He would return to France in October 1806.

=== Iranian motivation ===
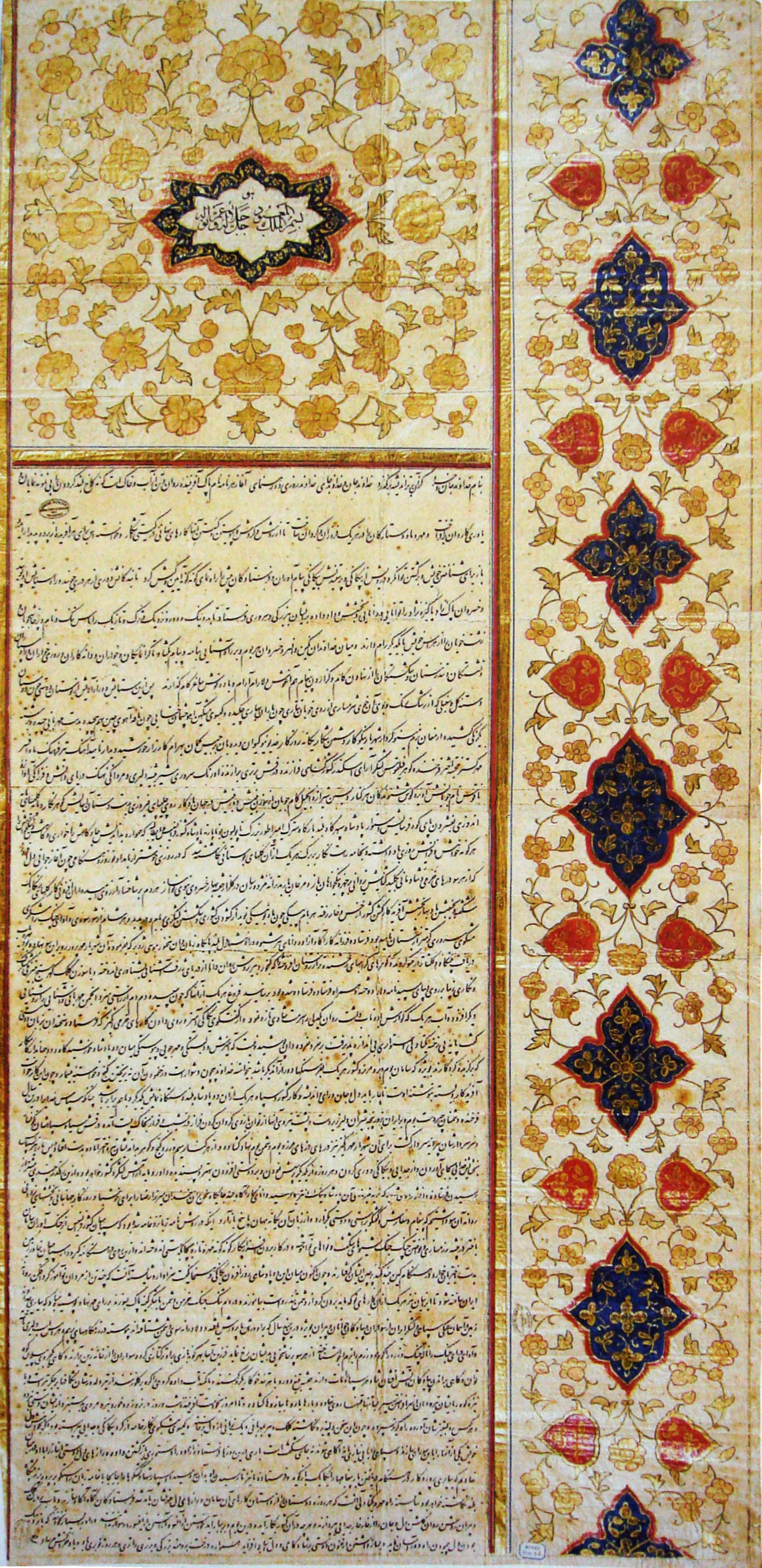
Letter of Fath-Ali Shah to Napoleon I, thanking him for the letter received through M. Jaubert, and asking for military instructors, December 1806.

On the other hand, the Shah of Persia needed help against Russia to his northern frontiers, as Russia had annexed Eastern Georgia in 1801 following the death of George XII of Georgia. General Tsitsianov occupied Georgia against rival Iranian claims, and attacked Ganja in Iran in 1804, triggering a Russo-Persian War, and soon the Russo-Turkish War was also declared in 1806.

Britain, an ally of Russia, had been temporizing without a clear show of support. The Shah decided to respond to Napoleon's offers, sending a letter carried by ambassador Mirza Mohammad-Reza Qazvini (Mirza Riza) to the court of Napoleon, then in Tilsit in eastern Prussia. In his instructions to the ambassador, the Shah explained that:

[Russia] was equally an enemy of the kings of Persia and of France, and her destruction accordingly became the duty of the two kings. France would attack her from that quarter, Persia from this.

— Instructions of the Shah of Persia to Mirza Riza

The Shah also clearly considered helping France in the invasion of India:

If the French have an intention of invading Khorasan, the king will appoint an army to go down by the road of Kabul and Kandahar.

— Instructions of the Shah of Persia to Mirza Riza

The Shah however denied the possibility of providing a port to the French "on their way to Hindustan".

=== Alliance and military mission ===
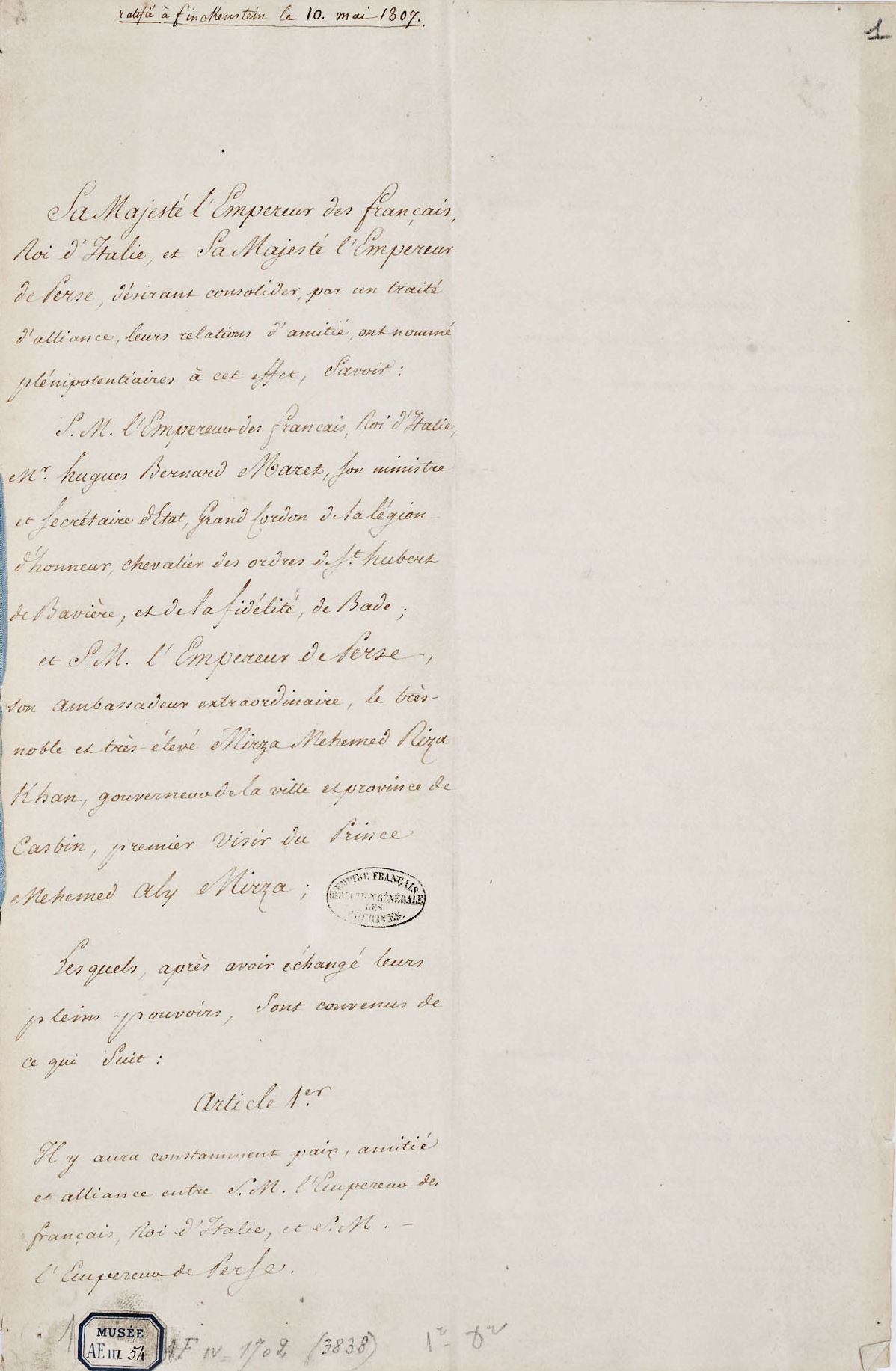
The Treaty of Finckenstein between Persia and France, ratified 10 May 1807.

Following the visit of the Iran Envoy Mirza Mohammad-Reza Qazvini to Napoleon, the Treaty of Finckenstein formalized the alliance on 4 May 1807, in which France supported Persia's claim to Georgia, promising to act so that Russia would surrender the territory. In exchange, Persia was to fight Great Britain, and to allow France to cross the Persian territory to reach India.

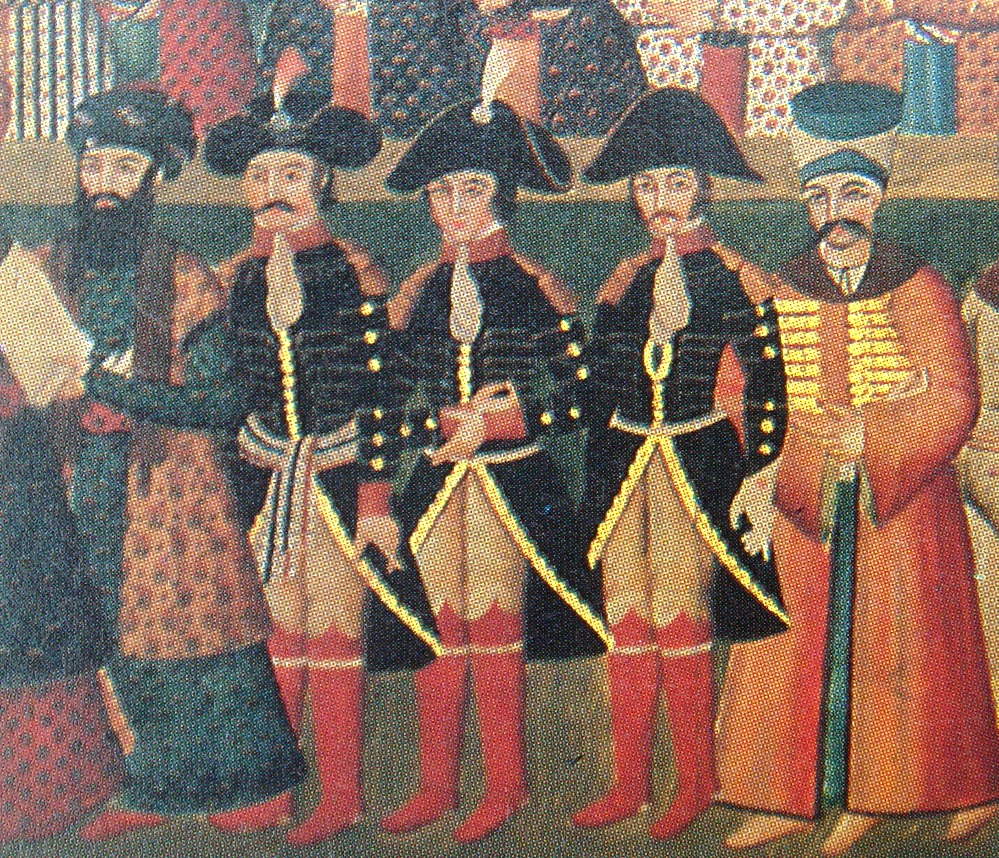
General Gardane, with colleagues Jaubert and Joanin, at the Persian court of Fath Ali Shah in 1808. The red socks were an element of Persian protocol.

A military mission was also sent under General Antoine Gardanne in order to help modernize the Persian army, and in order to chart an invasion route to India. Gardanne also had the missions to coordinate Ottoman and Persian efforts against Russia. Gardanne's mission consisted in 70 commissioned and non-commissioned officers, and started to work at modernizing the Persian army along European lines. The mission arrived on 4 December 1807.

Captains of infantry Lamy and Verdier trained the Nezame Jadid (New Army), which served under Prince Abbas Mirza. This modernized army successfully defeated a Russia Army attack on the strategic city of Erevan on 29 November 1808, showing the efficiency of French training. Lieutenants of artillery Charles-Nicolas Fabvier and Reboul were sent by Gardanne to Ispahan in order to set up a factory to produce cannons for the Persian artillery, complete with foundries, lathes, machinery and instruments. Against great odds, by December 1808, they had managed to produce 20 pieces of cannon in the European style, which were transported to Tehran.

The 19th century diplomat Sir Justin Sheil commented positively on the French contribution in modernizing the Persian army:

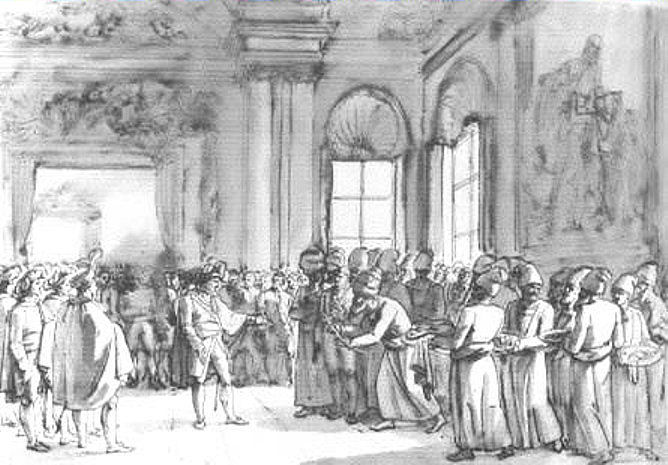
Askar Khan Afshar received by Napoleon I at Saint-Cloud, 4 September 1808, by Benjamin Zix.

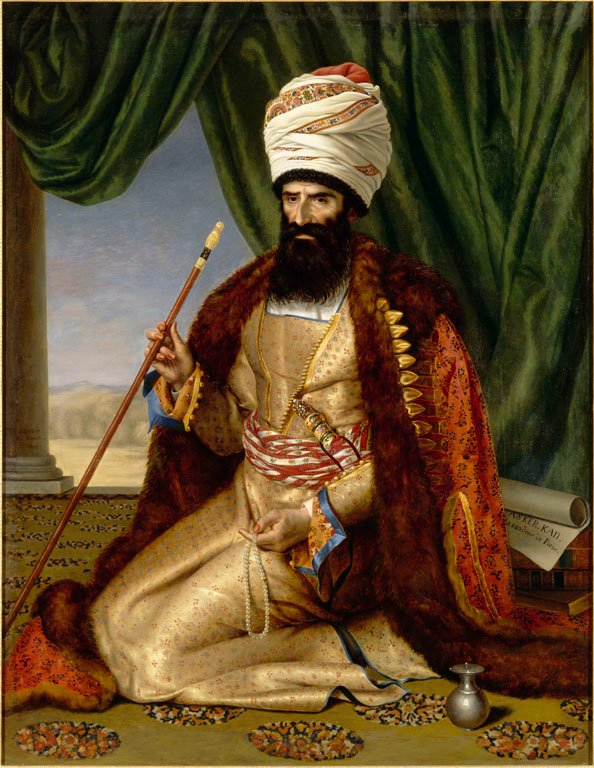
Iran ambassador Askar Khan Afshar, in Paris from July 1808 to April 1810, by Madame Vavin.

It is to the military genius of the French that we are indebted for the formation of the Indian army. Our warlike neighbours were the first to introduce into India the system of drilling native troops and converting them into a regularly disciplined force. Their example was copied by us, and the result is what we now behold. The French carried to Persia the same military and administrative faculties, and established the origin of the present Persian regular army, as it is styled. When Napoleon the Great resolved to take Iran under his auspices, he dispatched several officers of superior intelligence to that country with the mission of General Gardanne in 1808. Those gentlemen commenced their operations in the provinces of Azerbaijan and Kermanshah, and it is said with considerable success.

— Sir Justin Sheil (1803–1871).

The embassy of Gardanne to Persia soon lost one of the main reasons for its original dispatch. In a final reversal, Napoleon I finally vanquished Russia at the Battle of Friedland in July 1807, and France and Russia became allied at the Treaty of Tilsit. General Gardanne arrived in Tehran in Persia after the Treaty of Tilsit, in December 1807.

Napoleon however wished to continue fostering the Franco-Persian alliance, in order to pursue his plan of invading India. To this effect, he planned to nominate his brother Lucien Bonaparte as his representative in Tehran. Napoleon still planned to invade British India, this time with Russian help.

A Persian ambassador was sent to Paris, named Askar Khan Afshar. He arrived in Paris on 20 July 1808 and was able to meet Napoleon on 4 September 1808.

Persia however lost the main motivation for the alliance, the recovery of Georgia and Azerbaijan over Russia, which had not even been addressed at the Treaty of Tilsit.

The Franco-Persian alliance thus lost its main motivation as France and Russia were now allied. The Shah of Persia again turned to the British for military advisers. In the east, a mutual defense treaty was signed between British India and Shah Shuja al-Mulk of Afghanistan on 17 June 1809 in order to better resist the Franco-Persian threat, but by that time Persia had already denounced its alliance with France.

=== Return of a British alliance ===
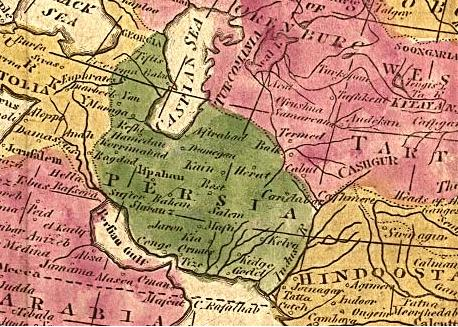
Persia in 1808 according to a British map, before losses to Russia in the north by the Treaty of Gulistan, and the loss of Herat to Great Britain in 1857 through the Treaty of Paris.

After the failed mission of John Malcolm in 1808, who was only allowed to negotiate with the Governor of Fars, Sir Harford Jones managed to sign in March 1809 a preliminary treaty with Persia and General Gardanne was returned to France. In another mission in 1810, Malcolm brought a large mission of officers, one of whom, Lindsay Bethune, would become Commander-in-Chief of the Persian army for several years. In 1809–1810, the Shah sent ambassador Haji Mirza Abul Hasan Khan to the Court in London, immortalized as Hajji Baba by diplomat James Morier. According to Sir Justin Sheil:

"English influence becoming supreme, and the French Mission having quitted Persia, it was determined to accede to the wishes of the Persian Government and continue the same military organization. Sir John Malcolm was accompanied in 1808 by two officers of the Indian army, Major Christie and Lieutenant Lindsay, to whom was confided this duty: they did it well. Major Christie was a man of considerable military endowments; he undertook the charge of the infantry, and was killed at his post at the battle of Aslandooz in 1812. His able successor was Major Hart, of the Royal Army. Under the auspices and indefatigable cooperation of Abbas Meerza, heir apparent to the throne of Persia, by whom absolute authority was confided to him, he brought the infantry of Azerbijan to a wonderful state of perfection. The artillery was placed under Lieutenant Lindsay, afterwards Major-General Sir H. Lindsay. This officer acquired extraordinary influence in the army, and in particular among the artillery. He brought this branch of the forces in Azerbijan to such a pitch of real working perfection, and introduced so complete a system of esprit de corps, that to this day his name is venerated, and traces of his instruction still survive in the artillery of that province, which even now preserves some degree of efficiency."

— Sir Justin Sheil (1803–1871).

== Epilogue ==
The alliance between France and the Ottoman Empire was maintained, and a peace settlement was brokered between Russia and the Ottomans, but the territories the Ottomans had been promised (Moldavia and Wallachia) through the Treaty of Tilsit were never returned, although the Ottomans themselves had complied with their part of the agreement by moving their troops south of the Danube.

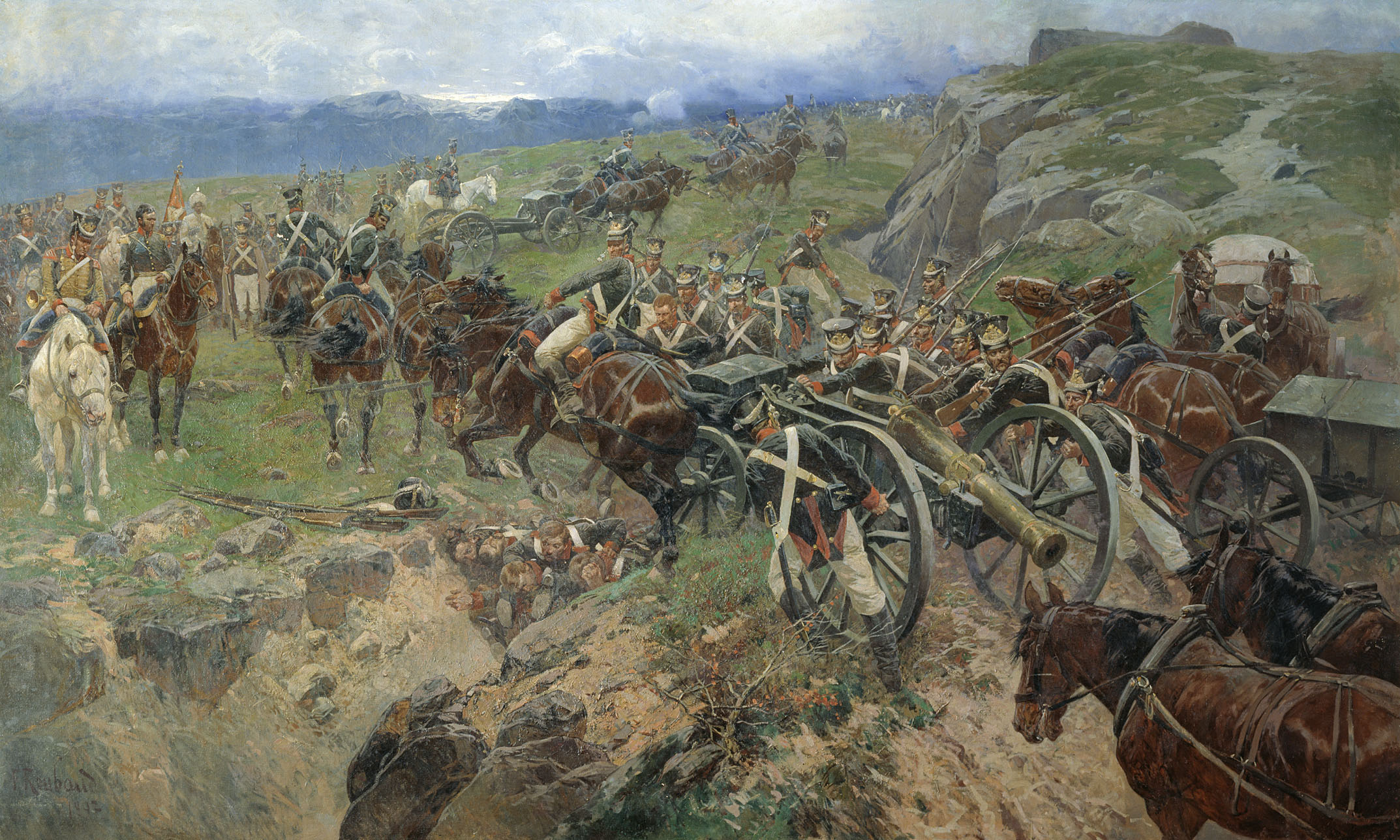
An episode of the 1804–1813 Russo-Persian War.

Meanwhile, a Russo-Persian War raged on despite France and Russia's efforts to try to reach a settlement between Russia and Persia. In 1812 Persia had to face a major defeat against Russia at the Battle of Aslandoz, forcing the Shah to negotiate the Treaty of Gulistan, on 12 October 1813, which resulted in huge territorial (and eventually irrevocable) integral territorial losses for Iran in its territories in the Caucasus region, comprising modern-day Georgia, Dagestan, and most of the contemporary Republic of Azerbaijan, per the Treaty of Gulistan of 1813.

In 1812, through the Treaty of Bucharest, the Ottoman Empire and Russia also agreed to make peace, just as Russia was anxious to liberate this southern front in anticipation of Napoleon's Invasion of Russia, with Russia keeping Bessarabia and the Ottomans regaining Wallachia and Moldavia.

After the fall of Napoleon, a French officer named Jean-François Allard visited Abbas Mirza to propose his services. He was promised the position of a Colonel, but never actually received the troops corresponding to his function. In 1820, Allard left for Punjab where he played a great role.

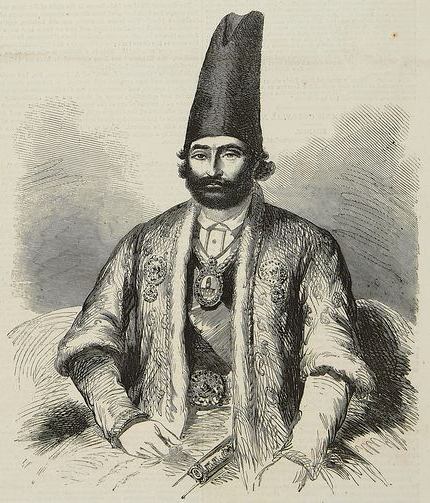
Ferouk Khan in The Illustrated London News, 1857.

After a long period of exchanges between Persia and Great Britain, diplomatic relations with France resumed in 1839 following a dispute between Great Britain and Persia over the Afghanistan city of Herat. Great Britain would remove its military and diplomatic missions from Persia, and briefly occupy Kharg Island and the city of Bushehr. Mohammad Shah Qajar would in turn resume diplomatic relations with France, and send a diplomatic mission to Louis-Philippe under Mirza Hossein Khan to obtain military help. In response, a group of French officers was sent to Persia with the returning ambassador.

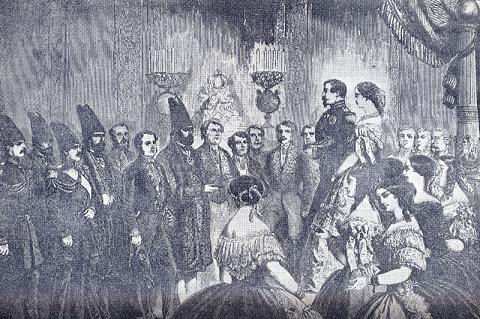
The Persian embassy to Napoleon III, led by Amin o Dowleh.

In 1857, during the Anglo-Persian War (1856–1857), a Persian ambassador named Ferouk Khan was sent to Napoleon III, who expressed his regrets about the conflict. Negotiations led to the March 1857 Treaty of Paris, which put an end to the Anglo-Persian War.

== See also ==
- Foreign alliances of France
- France-Near East relations
- France-Iran relations
- Treaty of Finckenstein
- Franco-Ottoman alliance
- Habsburg–Persian alliance
