= Treaty of Paris (1857) =

1857 treaty ending the Anglo-Persian War

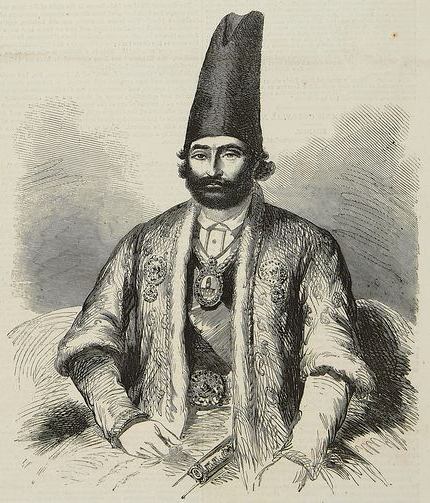
Farrokh Khan in The Illustrated London News, 1857.

The Treaty of Paris (1857) (Persian: عهدنامه پاریس ۱۸۵۷, romanized: Ahdnāme-ye Paris 1857) marked the end of the hostilities of the Anglo-Persian War. On the Persian side, negotiations were handled by ambassador Farrokh Khan. The two sides signed the peace treaty on 4 March 1857.

In the Treaty, the Persians agreed to withdraw from Herat, later allowing Dost Mohammad Khan of Afghanistan to occupy it. They also agreed to apologise to the British envoy on his return, and to sign a commercial treaty; the British agreed not to shelter opponents of the Shah in the embassy, and they abandoned the demand to replace the grand vizier Mirza Aqa Khan Nuri, as well as one requiring territorial concessions to the Imam of Oman, a British ally.

The British strategic interests in Afghanistan, an early consequence of the Great Game, ultimately brought an end to Qajar hopes to preserve Herat as a frontier vassalage, after more than fifty years of Iranian engagement. Three and a half centuries of nearly continuous, although frequently chaotic, inclusion of Herat as part of Iran came to an end with the Treaty of Paris.

Similar to how the Treaty of Turkmenchay with Russia in 1828 marked a turning point in relations between Iran and Russia, so too did the Treaty of Paris with Iran and Britain. The Qajar government realized the serious repercussions of confronting a European colonial power militarily after the conflict in Herat. The Iranians realized that in the age of empires, they would have to endure losing territory on its outskirts in order to protect its center. The loss of Herat, akin to the earlier loss of the Caucasian provinces, illustrated the limitations on authority over territories that were historically and culturally part of Greater Iran. Despite their deep-rooted ties, these areas could no longer be sustained as provinces within the Guarded Domains of Iran.

== See also ==
- Greater Iran
- Iran–United Kingdom relations
- Franco-Persian alliance
- British occupation of Bushehr

== Sources ==
- Amanat, Abbas (2003). "Herat vi. The Herat question". In Yarshater, Ehsan (ed.). Encyclopædia Iranica. Vol. XII/2: Hedāyat al-mota'allemin–Herat VII. London and New York: Routledge & Kegan Paul. pp. 219–224. ISBN 978-0-933273-75-7.
- Amanat, Abbas (2017). Iran: A Modern History. Yale University Press. ISBN 978-0300112542.
