= Treaty of Finckenstein =

1807 treaty between France and Persia

Treaty of Finckenstein/Kamieniec
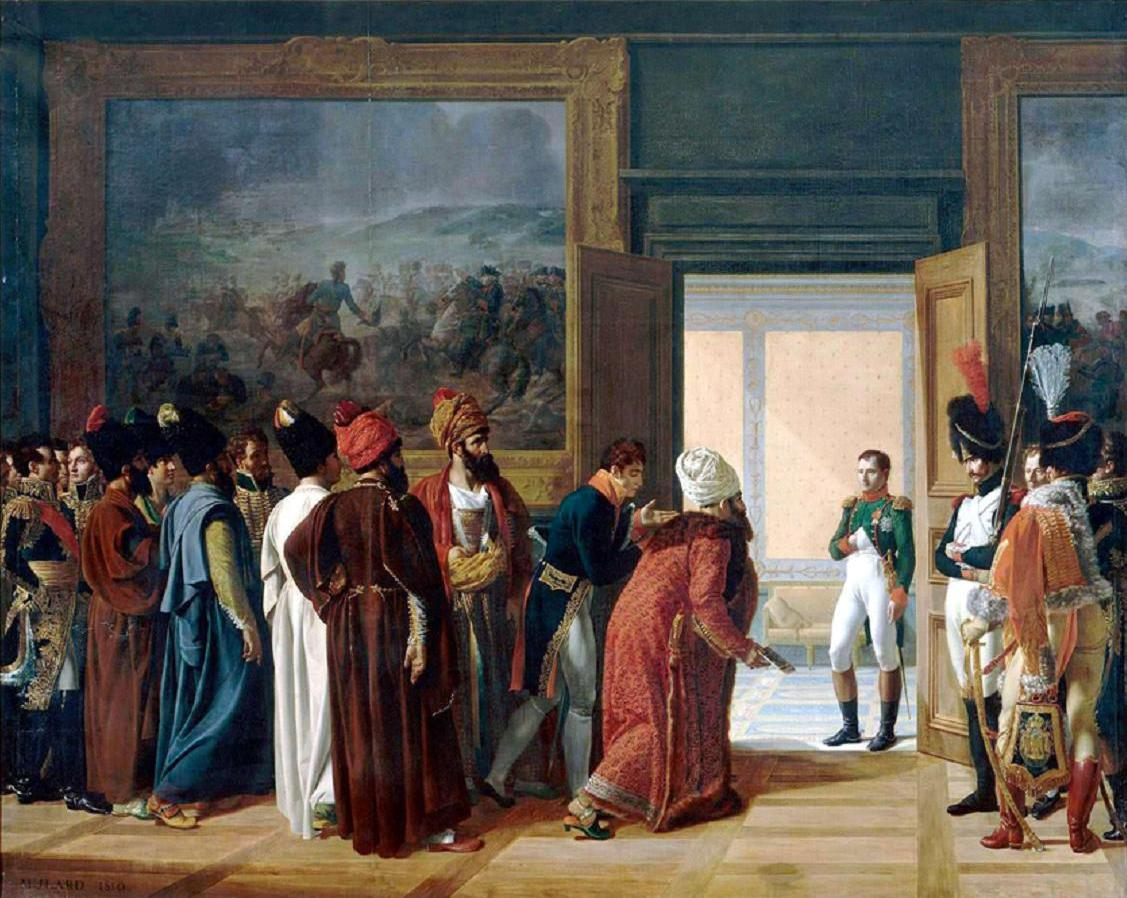
- The Persian Envoy Mirza Mohammad-Reza Qazvini meeting with Napoleon at the Finckenstein Palace, 27 April 1807, by François Mulard.
- Type: Alliance
- Signed: 4 May 1807
- Location: Finckenstein (now Kamieniec, Poland)
- Parties: French First Empire; Sublime State of Persia

The Treaty of Finckenstein (Persian: عهدنامه فین‌کنشتاین), often spelled Finkenstein, was a treaty concluded between France and Iran (Persia) in the Finckenstein Palace (now Kamieniec, Poland) on 4 May 1807 and formalised the Franco-Persian alliance.

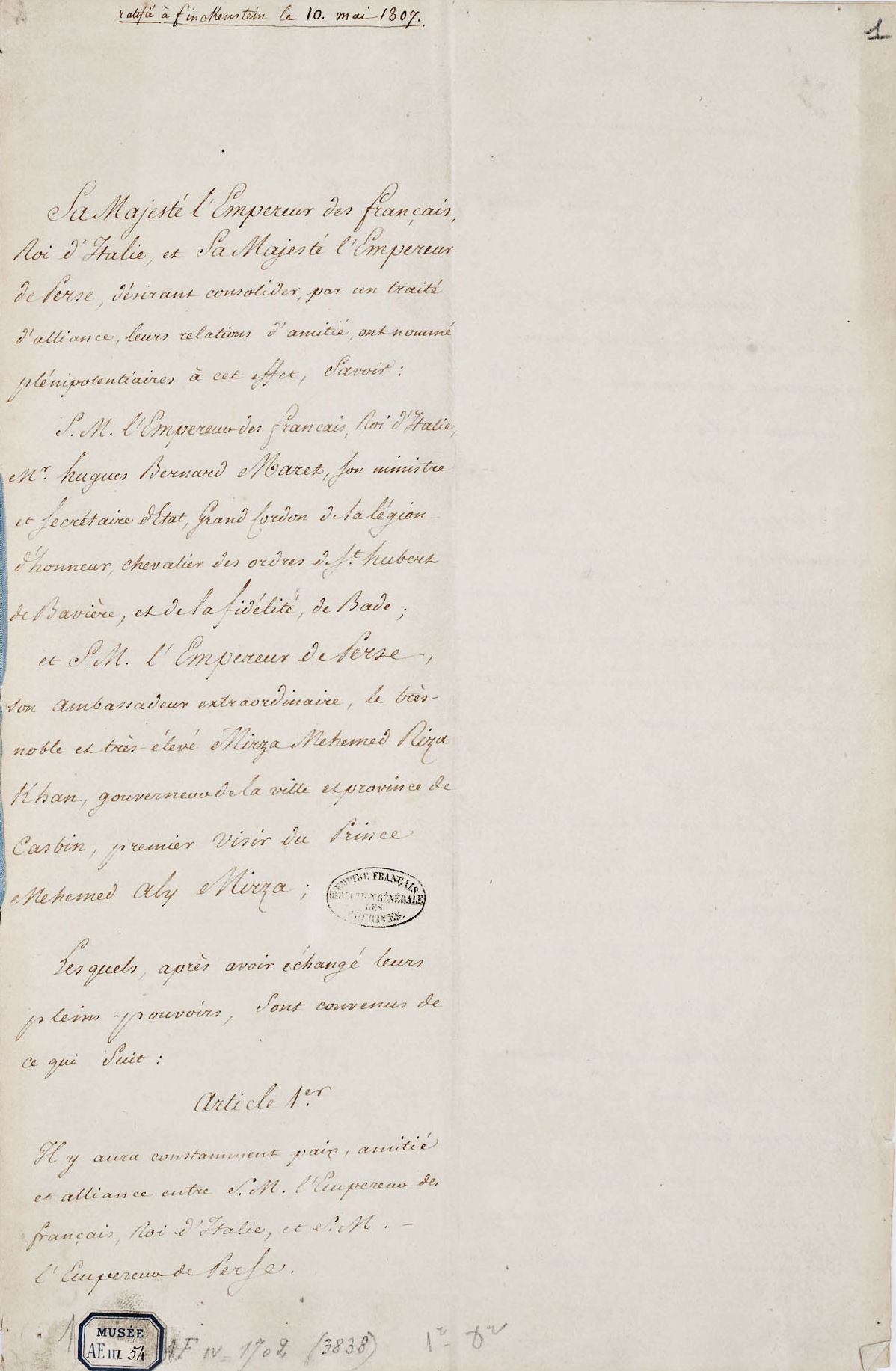
The Treaty of Finckenstein, ratified 10 May 1807.

Napoleon I guaranteed the integrity of Persia, recognized part of Georgia and the other parts of Transcaucasia and a part of the North Caucasus (Dagestan) as Fath Ali Shah's possession, and was to make all possible efforts for restoring those territories to him. Napoleon also promised to furnish the Shah with arms, officers and workmen. France on its side required the Shah to declare war against the United Kingdom, to expel all British people from Persia, and to maintain an open way if France wanted to attack British possessions in the Far East.

Despite the treaty, France failed to achieve diplomatic success in Persia, and none of its provisions were fully implemented. Furthermore, just two months after signing the treaty with Persia, France concluded the Treaties of Tilsit with Russia, effectively abandoning Iran in its struggle against Russian expansion.

On 12 March 1809, the United Kingdom signed a treaty with Persia forcing the French out of that country.

== See also ==
- Franco-Persian alliance
- Pierre Amédée Jaubert
- Claude Matthieu, Count Gardane
- François Mulard
- List of treaties
