= Claude Matthieu, Count Gardane =

French general and diplomat (1766–1818)

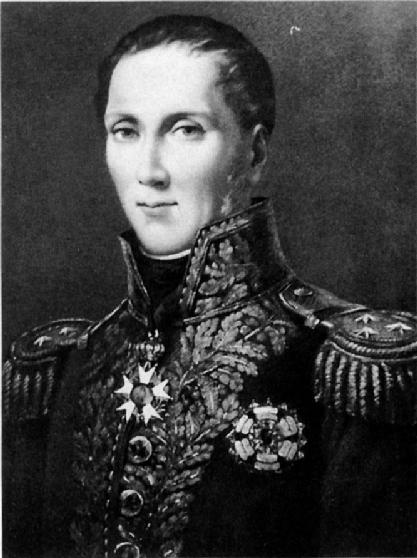
- Born: 11 July 1766; Marseille
- Died: 30 January 1818 (aged 51) Lincel Castle, Saint-Michel-l'Observatoire
- Branch: Cavalry
- Service years: 1780 – 1815
- Rank: Brigadier general
- Awards: Order of Saint Louis

Claude-Matthieu, Comte de Gardane (11 July 1766 in Marseille – 30 January 1818) was a French general and diplomat. He entered the army and rose rapidly during the revolutionary wars, becoming captain in 1793.

== Biography ==
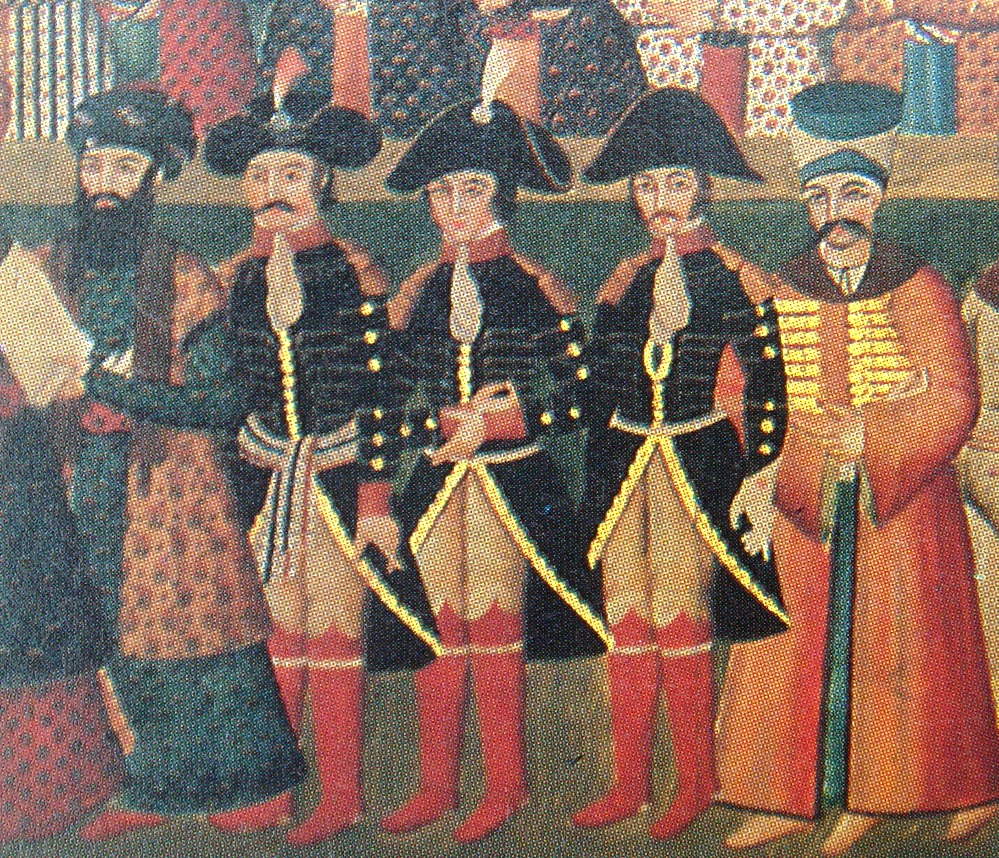
General Gardanne, with colleagues Jaubert and Joanin, at the Persian court of Fath Ali Shah in 1808.

In May 1799 he distinguished himself by saving a division of the French army which was about to be crushed by the Russians at the battle of Bassignana, and was named at once brigadier-general by Moreau. He incurred Napoleon's displeasure for an omission of duty shortly before the battle of Marengo (June, 1800), but in 1805 was appointed to be aide-de-camp of the emperor. His chief distinction, however, was to be won in the diplomatic sphere.

In the spring of 1807, when Russia and Prussia were at war with France, and the emperor Alexander I of Russia was also engaged in hostilities with Persia. The court of Tehran sent a mission to the French emperor, then at the Finckenstein Palace in East Prussia, with a view to the conclusion of a Franco-Persian alliance. The Treaty of Finckenstein was signed on 4 May 1807, at that castle; and Napoleon designed Gardane as special envoy for the cementing of that alliance. The secret instructions which he drew up for Gardane, and signed on 30 May, are of interest as showing the strong oriental trend of the emperor's policy.

France was to guarantee the integrity of Persia, to recognize that Georgia (then being invaded by the Russians) belonged to the shah, and was to make all possible efforts for restoring that territory to him. He was also to furnish to the shah arms, officers and workmen, in the number and to the amount demanded by him. Napoleon on his side required Persia to declare war against Great Britain to expel all Britons from her territory.

Gardane, whose family was well known in the Levant, had a long and dangerous journey overland, but was cordially received at Tehran in December 1807. The conclusion of the Franco-Russian treaty at Tilsit in July 1807 rendered the mission abortive. Persia longed only for help against Russia who had invaded its Caucasian territories and had no desire, when all hope of that was past, to attack India. The shah, however, promised to expel Britons and to grant to France a commercial treaty. For a time French influence completely replaced that of England at Tehran, and the mission of Sir John Malcolm to that court was not allowed to proceed. Finally, however, Gardane saw that nothing much was to be hoped for in the changed situation of European affairs, and abruptly left the country (April 1809). This conduct was not wholly approved by Napoleon, but he named him count and in 1810 attached him to Marshal Massena's army in Portugal. There, during the disastrous retreat from Santarém to Almeida, he suffered a check which brought him into disfavour.

== See also ==
- Franco-Persian Alliance
- Treaty of Finckenstein
