= Pierre Amédée Jaubert =

French diplomat and academic (1779–1847)

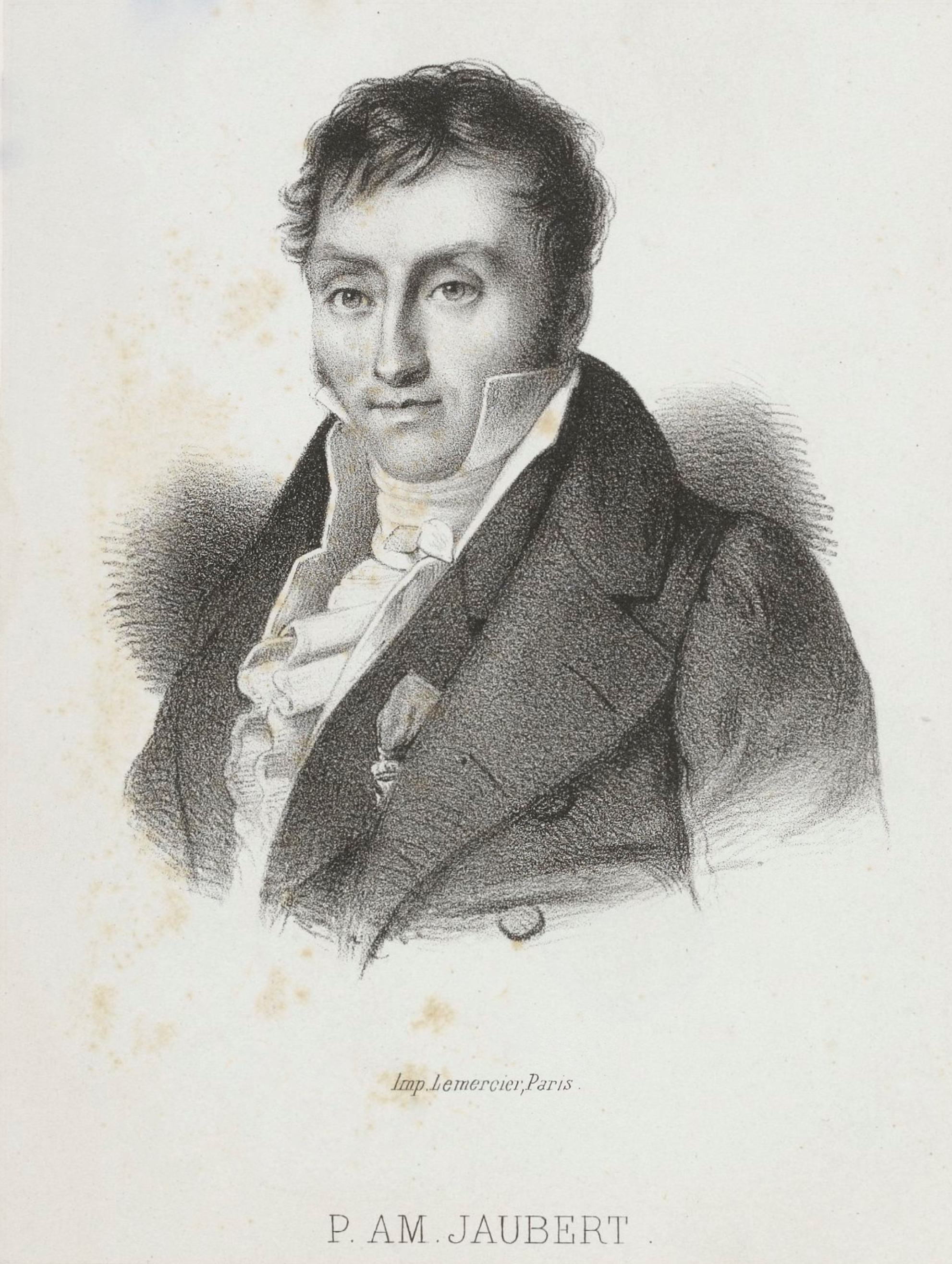
- Pierre Amédée Jaubert, circa 1805
- Born: 3 June 1779; Aix-en-Provence, Bouches-du-Rhône, France
- Died: 28 January 1847 (aged 67); Paris, France
- Occupations: Linguist, explorer, translator, diplomat, politician, professor, orientalist

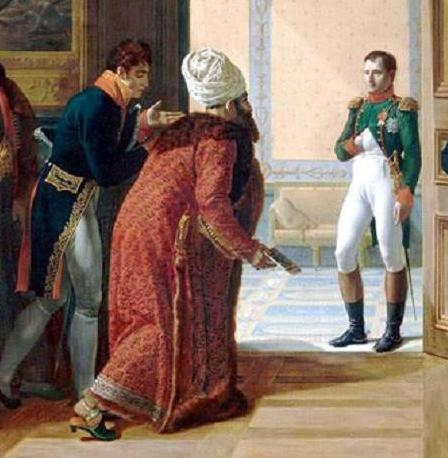
Amédée Jaubert accompanied the Persian Envoy Mirza Mohammad-Reza Qazvini at Finckenstein Palace to meet with Napoleon on 27 Avril 1807 for the Treaty of Finkenstein. Painting by François Mulard.

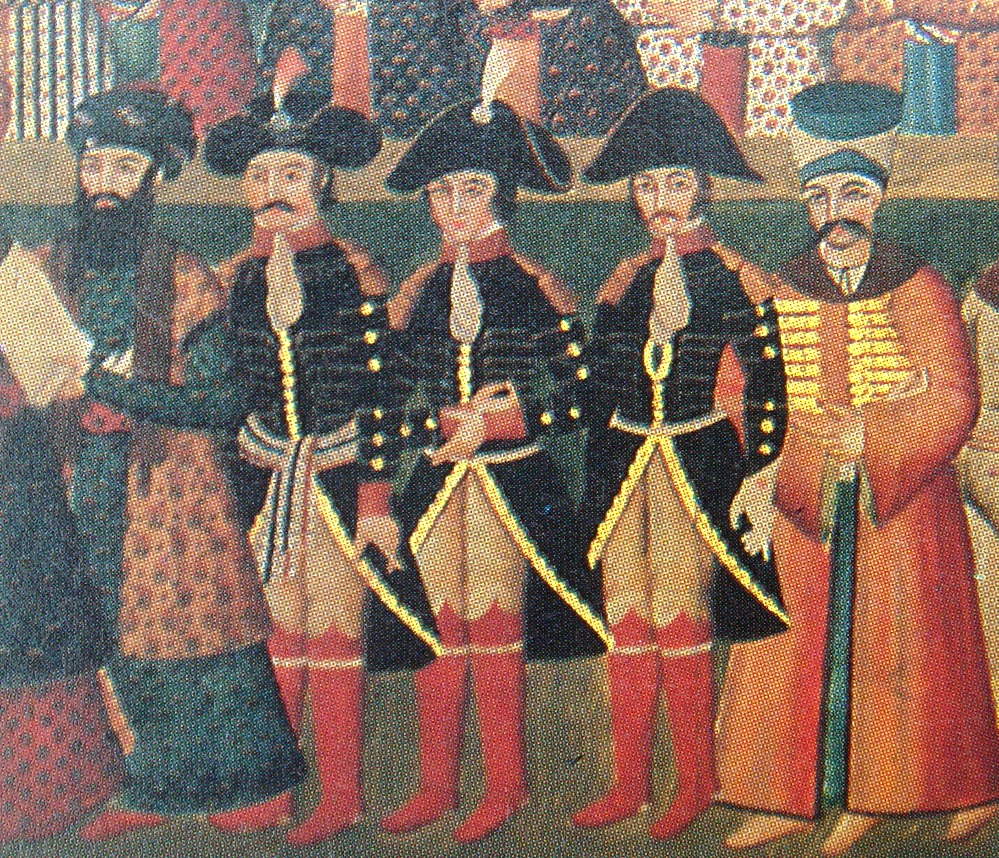
General Gardane, with colleagues Amédée Jaubert and Joanin, at the Persian court of Fath Ali Shah in 1808.

Pierre Amédée Emilien Probe Jaubert (3 June 1779 – 28 January 1847) was a French diplomat, academic, orientalist, translator, politician, and traveler. He was Napoleon's "favourite orientalist adviser and dragoman".

== Biography ==
Born in Aix-en-Provence, Jaubert was one of the most distinguished pupils of Silvestre de Sacy, whose funeral Discours he gave in 1838. Jaubert acted as interpreter to Napoleon Bonaparte during the Egyptian Campaign of 1798–1799, in which he was a member of the Egyptian Institute of Sciences and Arts.

On his return to Paris he held various posts in the government. In 1802 he accompanied Horace Sébastiani de La Porta on his Eastern mission, and in 1804 he was present in the Ottoman Empire, assisting Sébastiani in Istanbul.

In 1805, he was dispatched to Qajar Persia in the "Jaubert Mission", to arrange an alliance with Shah Fat′h Ali, but on the way there he was seized and imprisoned in a dry cistern for four months by the Pasha of Doğubeyazıt. Jaubert was allowed to go after the pasha died; he successfully accomplished his mission, and rejoined Napoleon in the Duchy of Warsaw (1807). Amédée Jaubert was at Finckenstein Palace for the negotiation of the Treaty of Finckenstein which formulised the Franco-Persian alliance on 27 April 1807. In 1809 he became correspondent of the Royal Institute of the Netherlands.

On the eve of Napoleon's downfall, he was appointed chargé d'affaires at Constantinople.

The Bourbon Restoration ended his diplomatic career, but in 1818 he undertook a journey with government aid to Tibet, from whence he succeeded in introducing into France 400 Kashmir goats. Jaubert spent the rest of his life in study, in writing and in teaching. He became professor of Persian in the Collège de France, and director of the École des langues orientales, and in 1830 was elected member of the Académie des Inscriptions. In 1841 he was made a Peer of France and member of the Conseil d'État. He died in Paris.

Besides articles in the Journal asiatique, he published Voyage en Arménie et en Perse (1821; the edition of 1860 has a notice of Jaubert, by M. Sdillot) and Elements de la grammaire turque (1823–1834).

== See also ==
- Franco-Persian alliance
