= Siege of Hulst =

Siege of Hulst may refer to:

- Siege of Hulst (1591), a Dutch and English victory led by Maurice of Orange
- Siege of Hulst (1596), a Spanish victory led by Archduke Albert
- Siege of Hulst (1645), a Dutch victory led by Frederick Henry
