= Frederick, Burgrave of Dohna =

German nobleman and officer in Dutch service (1621–1688)

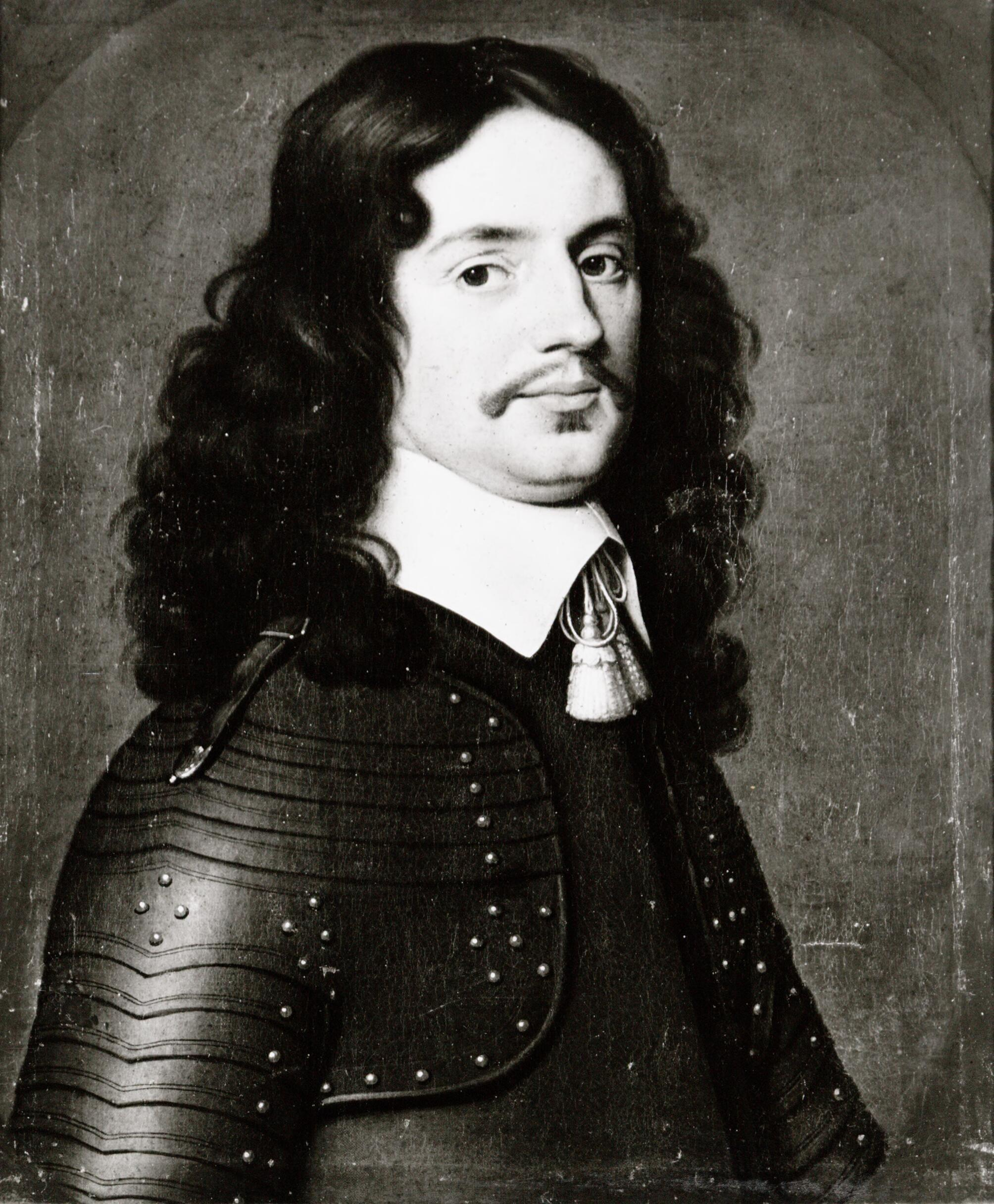
- Frederick of Dohna-Carwinden
- Born: 4 February 1621; Küstrin
- Died: 27 March 1688 (aged 67); Lutry, near Lausanne
- Buried: Lausanne
- Noble family: House of Dohna
- Spouse: Espérance du Puy de Montbrun
- Father: Christopher von Dohna
- Mother: Ursula of Solms-Braunfels

Frederick, Burgrave of Dohna (4 February 1621 in Küstrin – 27 March 1688 in Lutry, near Lausanne) was a German nobleman, an officer in Dutch service and a governor of the Principality of Orange. He later also rendered services to the Electorate of Brandenburg. Near the end of his life, he chose Switzerland, where he was highly regarded, as his adopted country.

== Ancestry ==
He was a member of the Vianen line of the noble von Dohna family. His parents belonged to the retinue of Elector Palatine Frederick V, Elector Palatine during his time as King of Bohemia. His father, Christopher von Dohna, was Lord Chamberlain and secret councillor at Frederick V's Bohemian court. After Frederick's fall, the family fled to Küstrin, where Frederick was born. Later they moved to Carwinden, Delft and finally to Orange, where Christopher was governor from 1629 onwards.

His mother was Ursula of Solms-Braunfels. Her sister Amalia of Solms-Braunfels had married the Dutch military commander, Frederick Henry, Prince of Orange. Thus, Frederick was related to the stadtholder of Holland.

His brothers Christian Albert and Christopher Delphicus served as officers in the army of Brandenburg-Prussia.

== Career ==
Frederick himself served in the Dutch States Army under Prince Henry Casimir II from 1636. He was eventually promoted to lieutenant general. Prince William II, Prince of Orange of Orange appointed him governor of Orange in 1649. This was a difficult task, due to unrest in the principality and strife within the Orange-Nassau family. The situation was further complicated by Elector Frederick William of Brandenburg, who was a relative of the Orange-Nassau family, and by King Louis XIV of France, who wanted to annex the principality. Frederick served as governor, until France annexed Orange in 1660.

In 1657, he purchased the barony of Coppet in the Swiss region of Vaud, on the north shore of Lake Geneva. Back then, Vaud was not yet a separate canton, it was a territory held by the canton of Bern. After Orange was occupied by France, Frederick moved to Coppet and transformed the castle in the town into a château.

He rendered various diplomatic services for Elector Frederick William of Brandenburg. During the run-up to the Nine Years' War, he tried in vain to talk Switzerland into joining the Grand Alliance against Louis XIV. He did manage to convince a substantial number of Swiss farmers to settle in Brandenburg. When in 1667, an attack on Savoy threatened, Frederick commanded the troops in Geneva. He was highly regarded in Switzerland, and was granted citizenship in the canton of Bern.

His children were educated by the polymath Pierre Bayle.

Towards the end of his life, he suffered from various medical problems. His feet were paralyzed, which prevented him from returning to the Dutch military service. He nevertheless advised the new stadtholder, Prince William III.

He died on 27 March 1688 and, at the instigation of the government of Bern, he was buried in Lausanne.

== Marriage and issue ==
In 1656, Frederick married Espérance, a daughter of Jean du Puy de Montbrun, Comte de Ferrassières et de Pont-de-Vesle. They had the following children together:

- Henriette Catharina Amalia (12 November 1658 – 18 September 1707), married Julius Henry of Friesen (17 Juni 1657 – 28 August 1706) in Epeysolles on 5 May 1680
- Frederick Albert (1659-1662)
- Louise Antoinette (1 October 1660 – 16 January 1716), married to Frederick Christopher, Burgrave of Dohna-Carwinden (7 January 1664 – 15 July 1727) in Geneva on 15 March 1685
- Alexander (1661-1728), married:
  1. in Wismar, on 29 July 1684, to Louise Amalia (20 July 1661 – 2 April 1724), a daughter of Frederick's brother Christopher Delphicus
  2. in Reichterswalde on 25 December 1725, to Johanna Sophia of Dohna-Lauck (27 August 1682 – 2 April 1735)
- John Frederick, (9 November 1663 – 24 July 1712), Marquis de Ferrassieres, lieutenant general in the Dutch army, married:
  1. on 14 March 1692 to Lady Helen McCarthy (1671 – 24 April 1698)
  2. on 5 March 1702 to Countess Albertine Henriette of Bylandt (26 October 1673 – 1725)
- Henriette Ursula (25 January 1663 – 2 May 1712), married in Detmold on 29 March 1695 to Count Frederick Christian of Lippe-Detmold (13 September 1668 – 18 October 1724)
- Christopher (1665-1733), married Frederike Marie (21 December 1660 – 22 November 1729), a daughter of Frederick's brother Christian Albert
- Espérance Geneva Magdalena (16 May 1668 – 2 August 1729)
- Sophia Albertine (12 August 1674 – 23 September 1746), married in Schlobitten on 16 April 1713 to Henry William of Solms-Wildenfels-Laubach
