= Debien =

Debien may refer to:

== People ==
- Maud Debien (born 1938), Canadian politician
- Tatiana Debien (born 1991), Russian-born French freestyle wrestler

== Places ==
- Dębień, Braniewo County, in northern Poland (Gmina Wilczęta)
- Dębień, Działdowo County, in northern Poland (Gmina Rybno)

== See also ==
- Debian
