= Christopher von Dohna =

German politician and scholar

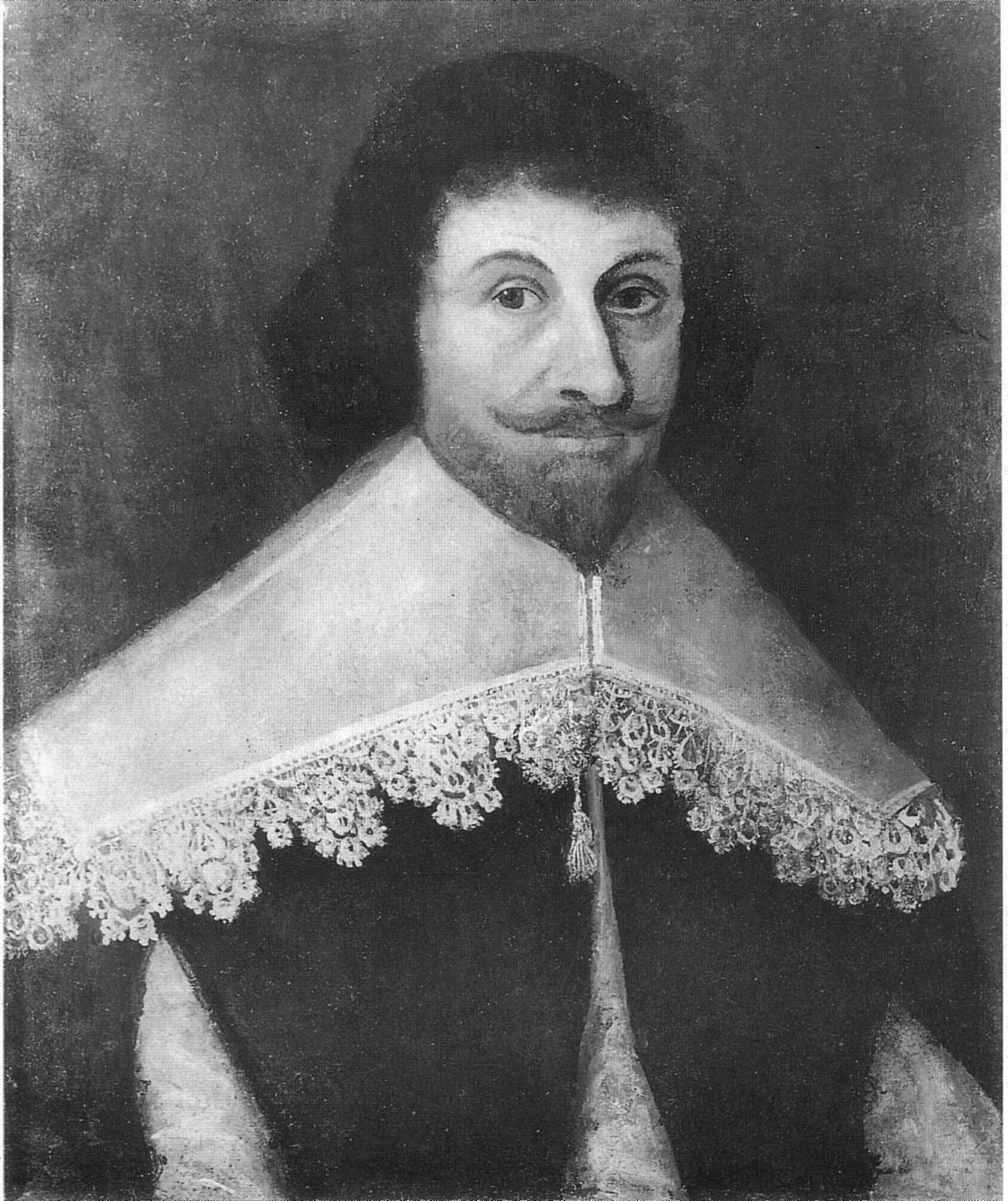
Christoph zu Dohna-Carwinden

Burgrave Christopher von Dohna (German: Burggraf Christoph von Dohna; 27 June 1583 – 1 July 1637) was a German politician and scholar during the time of the Thirty Years' War. He came from the Prussian family of the Burgraves of Dohna.

== Biography ==
Dohna was born in 1583 in Mohrungen (Morąg), Duchy of Prussia (a fief of the Crown of Poland), the son of Achatius von Dohna, by his marriage to Barbara von Wernsdorf. After brief instruction by a private tutor, Dohna attended a series of educational institutions: the University of Rostock (1597), the University of Altdorf (1598), the University of Heidelberg (1599), the University of Siena (1601), the University of Perugia (1602), the University of Geneva (1604), and then in 1606 he returned to the University of Heidelberg.

Upon leaving his final university, Dohna entered the service of Christian I, Prince of Anhalt-Bernburg. On the death of Frederick IV, Elector Palatine in 1610, Frederick IV was succeeded by his 14-year-old son Frederick V, Elector Palatine. Christian of Anhalt-Bernburg became one of Frederick V's most trusted advisers, and, as Frederick's chancellor, exercised a large degree of influence over the young Elector. Upon Christian's recommendation, Frederick made Dohna a member of his Council (Rat). Under Christian's tutelage, Dohna rose to become Frederick's Chamberlain (Oberstkämmerer) in 1620. He married Ursula von Solms-Braunfels on 23 March 1620.

Dohna had also remained active as a scholar and was invited to join the Fruitbearing Society in 1619 due to his learning in the healing properties of natural herbs. He adopted the oregano plant as his emblem.

Following the collapse of Frederick V's policies in 1620 and the occupation of his territories by imperial troops later in 1620, Dohna fled to Küstrin. He later moved to Spandau, where his wife was entitled to an appanage. He spent the years between 1624 and 1628 living privately on his ancestral estate at Carwinden (today Karwiny). In 1628, he was forced to flee from there when the Polish–Swedish War spread onto his property, going first to Emden.

In October 1630, Frederick Henry, Prince of Orange, appointed his brother-in-law Dohna as Governor of the Principality of Orange, a post he held until his death. He died in Orange, on 1 July 1637, aged 54.

== Marriage and issue ==
Christopher was married to Ursula, a daughter of John Albert I of Solms-Braunfels. Together, they had the following children:

- Frederick of Dohna (1621–1688)
- Christian Albrecht zu Dohna (1621–1677)
- Heinrich zu Dohna (1624–1643)
- Elisabeth Charlotte zu Dohna-Carwinden (1625–1691)
- Henriette Amalie zu Dohna-Carwinden (1626–1655)
- Catharina zu Dohna-Carwinden (1627–1697)
- Christoph Delphicus zu Dohna (1628–1668)
- Louise zu Dohna-Carwinden (1633–1690)

== Literary output ==
A man of letters, Dohna composed poetry in German, Italian, and Latin. He translated several scientific works, as well as Petrus Ramus' De militia C. J. Cæsaris and Abraham Scultetus' De curriculo vitae sue narratio apologetica.
