= Chmielówka =

Chmielówka may refer to the following villages in north-east Poland:

- Chmielówka, Podlaskie Voivodeship
- Chmielówka, Braniewo County (Warmian-Masurian Voivodeship)
- Chmielówka, Olsztyn County (Warmian-Masurian Voivodeship)

It may also refer to the Polish name for the village of Khmelivka, in Ternopil oblast, Ukraine
