= Dębień, Braniewo County =

Dębień
- Village
- Location within Poland
- Coordinates: 54°8′6″N 19°49′2″E
- Country: Poland
- Voivodeship: Warmian-Masurian
- County: Braniewo
- Gmina: Wilczęta
- Population: 95

Dębień [ˈdɛmbjɛɲ] is a village in the administrative district of Gmina Wilczęta, within Braniewo County, Warmian-Masurian Voivodeship, in northern Poland.

== Location ==
Dębień is located in the northwestern part of the Warmian–Masurian Voivodeship, approximately 15 kilometres northeast of Pasłęk and 25 kilometres south of Braniewo.

== History ==
The village was formerly known as Luisenwalde and from 1912 as Louisenwalde. It originally consisted of a single large estate.

On 30 September 1928, Louisenwalde was merged with the estate districts of Karwinden (now Karwiny) and Lauck (now Ławki) to form the new rural municipality of Karwinden in the district of Preußisch Holland, East Prussia, in the Königsberg administrative district.

Following the Second World War, the village became part of Poland in 1945 and was renamed Dębień. It is now a settlement in the Gmina of Wilczęta, Braniewo County, and Warmian–Masurian Voivodeship. From 1975 to 1998, it was part of the Elbląg Voivodeship. Dębień and Karwiny together form a sołectwo (village administrative district) within the municipality.
