= Ebersbach =

Ebersbach can refer to several places in Germany:

- Ebersbach an der Fils, a town in the district of Göppingen, Baden-Württemberg
- Ebersbach, Görlitz, a former town in the district of Görlitz, Saxony
- Ebersbach, Meißen, a municipality in the district of Meißen, Saxony
- Ebersbach (Döbeln), a village in the town of Döbeln, Mittelsachsen district, Saxony
- The German name for Stare Siedlisko, in the Warmian-Masurian Voivodeship, Poland
- several smaller municipalities and villages
