= Christopher Delphicus zu Dohna =

German-born soldier and diplomat (1628 – 1668)

Count Christopher Delphicus zu Dohna-Carwinden
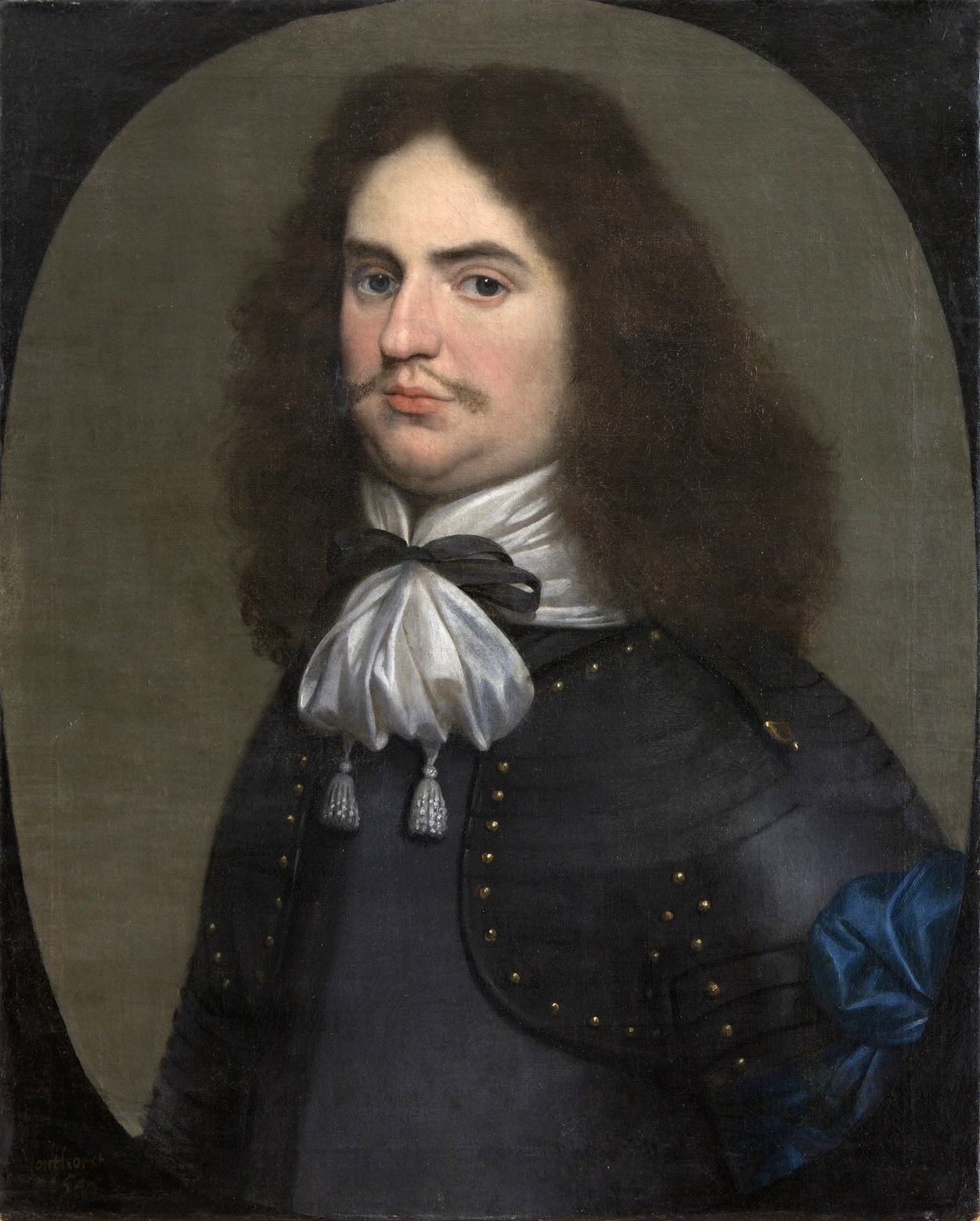
- Portrait of Christoph Delphicus zu Dohna by studio of Gerard van Honthorst
- Born: 4 June 1628; Delft, Dutch Republic
- Died: 31 May 1668 (aged 39); London
- Burial place: Uppsala Cathedral, Sweden
- Military career
- Allegiance: (Sweden) Swedish Empire
- Branch: Swedish Army
- Service years: 1652–1666
- Rank: Field Marshal
- Conflicts: Thirty Years War; • Siege of Hulst (1645); Second Northern War (1655–1660); Swedish War with Bremen (1666)
- Other work: Swedish envoy in The Hague and London (1667–68)

Count and Burgrave Christopher Delphicus zu Dohna-Carwinden (German: Christoph Delphicus Graf und Burggraf zu Dohna-Carwinden, Swedish: greve Kristofer Delphicus af Dohna; 4 June 1628 – 21 May 1668) was a Dutch Republic-born soldier and diplomat.

His ancestor, Dohna family came from Carwinden, then in Brandenburg-Prussia, now part of modern Poland, but he was born in the Dutch Republic and spent much of his life in the service of the Swedish Empire. Appointed Field Marshal in 1666, he helped negotiate the 1667 Treaty of Breda and the 1668 Triple Alliance, the first in a series of attempts to contain French expansion under Louis XIV.

He died in London on 31 May 1668 and later buried in Uppsala Cathedral, Sweden.

== Life ==
Dohna was born on 4 June 1628, the fourth son of Christopher von Dohna (1583–1637) and Ursula von Solms-Braunfels (1594–1657). The family came from Carwinden, then in Brandenburg-Prussia, now part of modern Poland. His father moved to the Netherlands in 1628 when his estates were over-run during the 1626 to 1629 Polish–Swedish War; in 1630, he was appointed Governor of the Principality of Orange in 1630, which he retained until his death in 1637. Dohna's birth in the Dutch town of Delft is commemorated in the name 'Delphicus'.

He had twelve siblings, the most prominent being Friedrich, (1621–1688), who also became Governor of the Principality of Orange, and Christian Albrecht, (1621–1677), a general in the Prussian army.

In 1658, he married Countess Anna (1620–1690), a daughter of Gabriel Bengtsson Oxenstierna, member of the powerful Oxenstierna family and distant relative of the Swedish Royal family. They had three surviving children, Charlotte (1660–1735), Amalie (1661–1724), and Friedrich Christoph (1664–1727). Throughout his career, Friedrich served both Prussia and Sweden and in 1697 was appointed Prussia's representative in Stockholm.

== Career ==
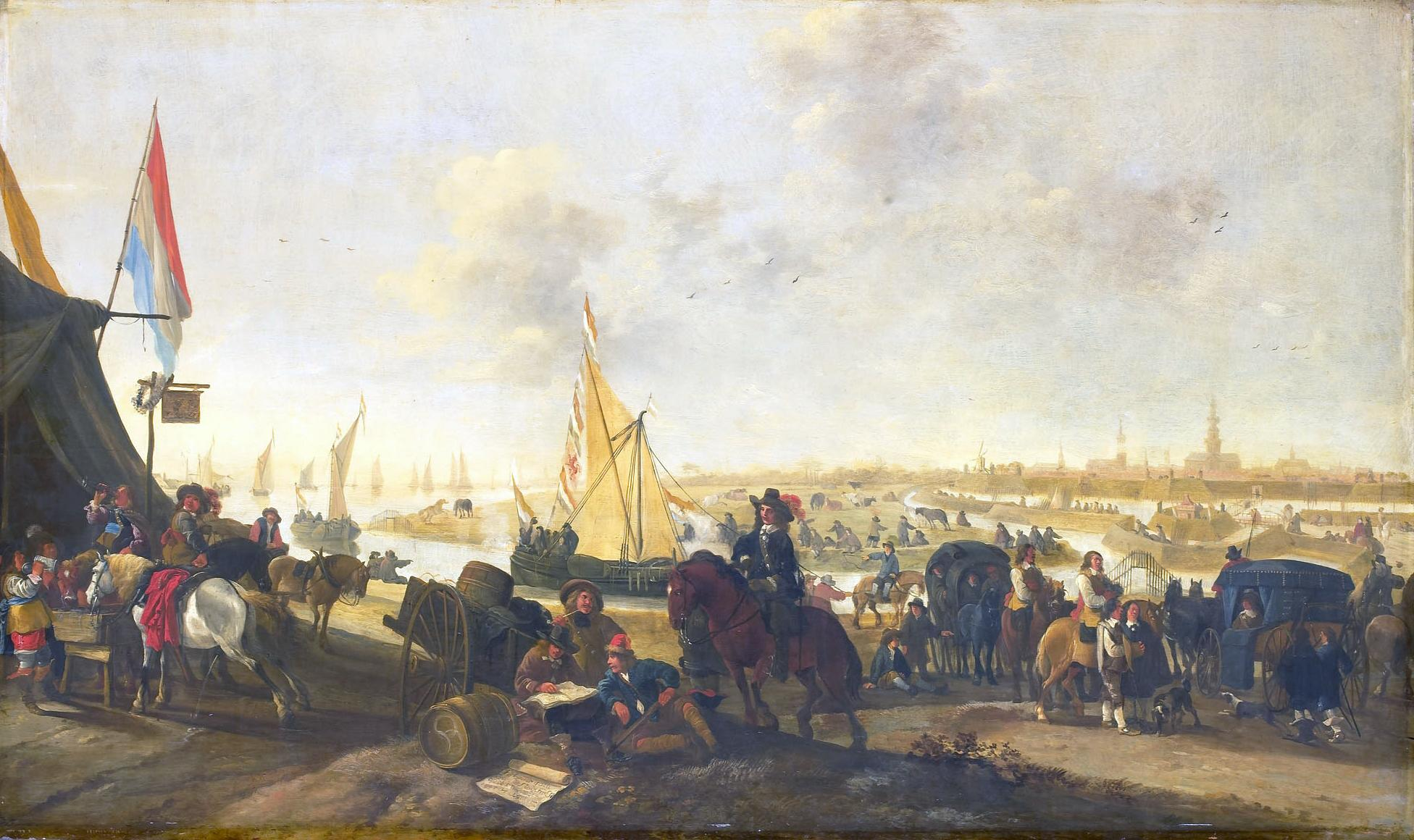
Dohna took part in the 1645 Siege of Hulst, last major action of the Thirty Years War.

Dohna is a good example of the fluidity of European society in the 17th century, where religion and family were often more important than nationality. His father was a Calvinist member of the Brandenburg nobility, with close ties to Frederick Henry (1584–1647), hereditary Prince of Orange and Stadtholder of six Dutch provinces, including Holland, Zeeland and Utrecht. Prince Henry's wife, Amalia of Solms-Braunfels, was Dohna's aunt; his cousin William II (1626–1650), succeeded to his father's titles in 1647.

In 1645, Dohna enlisted in the Dutch army and took part in the Siege of Hulst, last major action of the Thirty Years War, which ended with the 1648 Peace of Westphalia. His cousin William II died in 1650 and two years later, Dohna was appointed Chamberlain to Christina, Queen of Sweden. In 1653, he was promoted to colonel in the Royal Guard, then major general in 1654, shortly before Christina abdicated in favour of her cousin Charles X.

The relationship between Dohna and Christina is hard to assess; he clearly benefitted from frequent promotions but she was notorious for an indiscriminate distribution of posts and titles, while many historians consider her either asexual or homosexual. However, on her journey into exile, she dressed as a man and used the name 'Count Dohna'; in later life, she sometimes employed the title 'Countess Dohna'.

His marriage to Anna in 1658 made Dohna brother-in-law to Bengt Gabrielsson Oxenstierna (1623–1702), a close advisor to Charles X, who then led the Swedish invasion of the Polish–Lithuanian Commonwealth in 1655. He fought in the 1655 to 1660 Second Northern War and the 1666 Swedish War with Bremen, after which he was promoted Field Marshal.

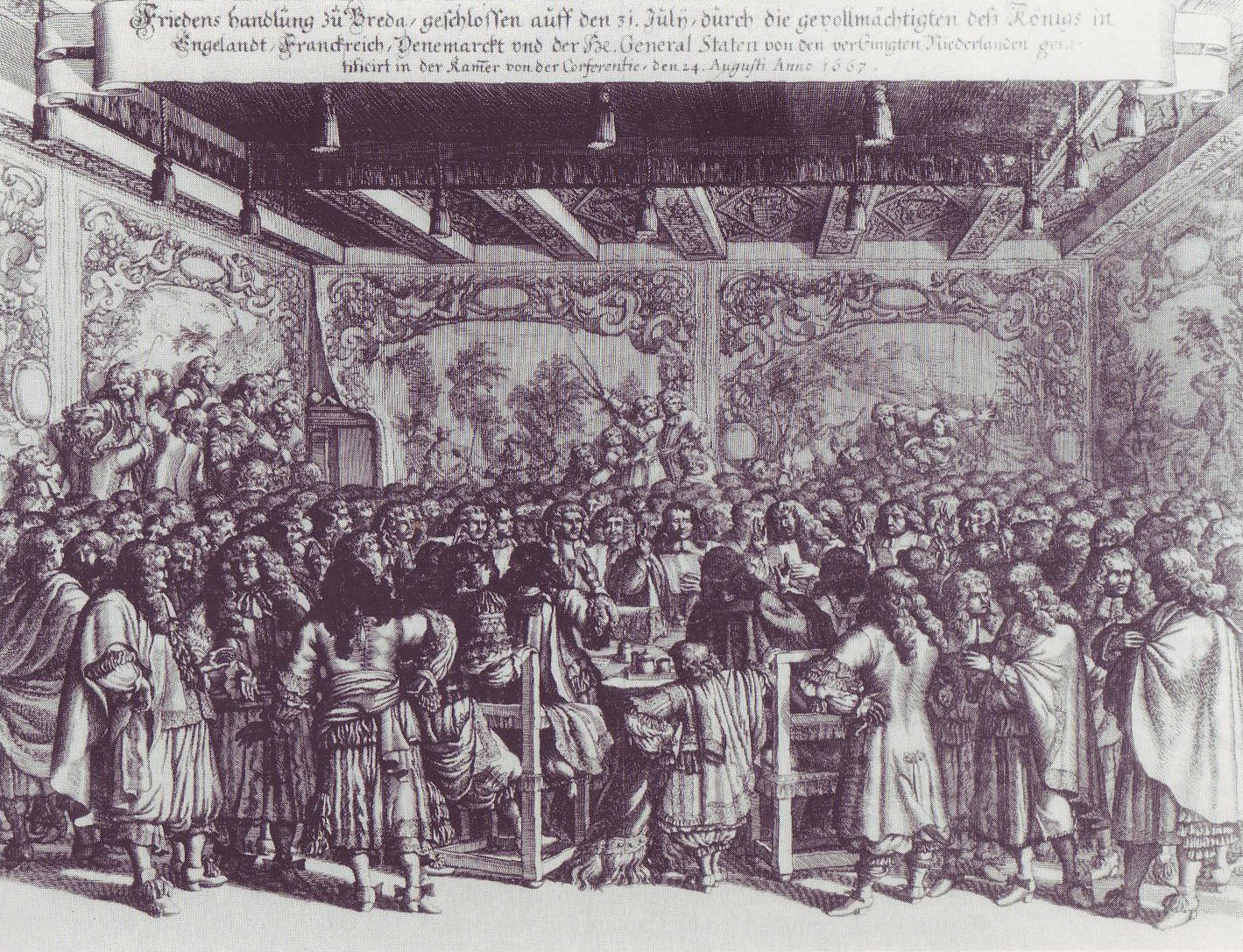
The 1667 Treaty of Breda; although Sweden was not a signatory, Dohna helped negotiate a Dutch-Swedish alliance as part of it

In 1667, Dohna was part of the Swedish delegation that mediated an end to the 1665 to 1667 Second Anglo-Dutch War. Their involvement arose from concerns over retaining control of the Baltic grain trade; the envoys sought to remove commercial concessions imposed by the Dutch Republic in the 1656 Treaty of Elbing, and end its alliance with Denmark.

While lead negotiator Göran Fleming helped finalise the Treaty of Breda, Dohna was in The Hague, negotiating a separate Dutch-Swedish agreement. Both were signed on 31 July, while Dohna also managed to gain concessions on the Treaty of Elbing; the Dutch gave him 100,000 guilders in recognition of his services.

On 31 January 1668, England signed a treaty of friendship with the Dutch Republic and Sir William Temple, English ambassador in The Hague, invited Sweden to join them. After it had been approved by the government in Stockholm. Dohna travelled to London and signed on 25 April, creating the Triple Alliance. Considered a triumph for Swedish diplomacy, it brought together the three major powers in the Baltic and North Sea. In addition, Sweden was supposed to receive subsidies from Spain, although these were never paid.

Dohna remained in London, where he died on 31 May 1668 and initially buried in Storkyrkan Cathedral, Stockholm, before being transferred to Uppsala Cathedral in 1674. The Triple Alliance collapsed in 1672 but his memorial in Uppsala includes his role in negotiating it; his monument was designed and executed by the Flemish sculptor Pieter Verbrugghen the Elder and still exists.

== Sources ==
- Cannon, Richard (1838). Historical Record of the British Army; 3rd Foot. HMSO.
- Gooskens, Frans (2016). Sweden and the Treaty of Breda in 1667 – Swedish diplomats help to end naval warfare between the Dutch Republic and England (PDF). De Oranje-boom; Historical and Archeology Circle of the City and Country of Breda.
- Lindstrom, Peter; Norrhem, Svante (2013). Flattering Alliances: Scandinavia, Diplomacy & the Austrian-French Balance of Power, 1648-1740. Nordic Academic Press. ISBN 978-9187351075.
- Macintosh, Claude Truman (1973). French Diplomacy during the War of Devolution, the Triple Alliance and the Treaty of Aix-la-Chapelle. Xerox University Microfilms - OhioLINK ETD: Ohio State University; PHD thesis.
