= Siege of Hulst (1596) =

1596 siege

- Part of the Eighty Years' War & the Anglo–Spanish War
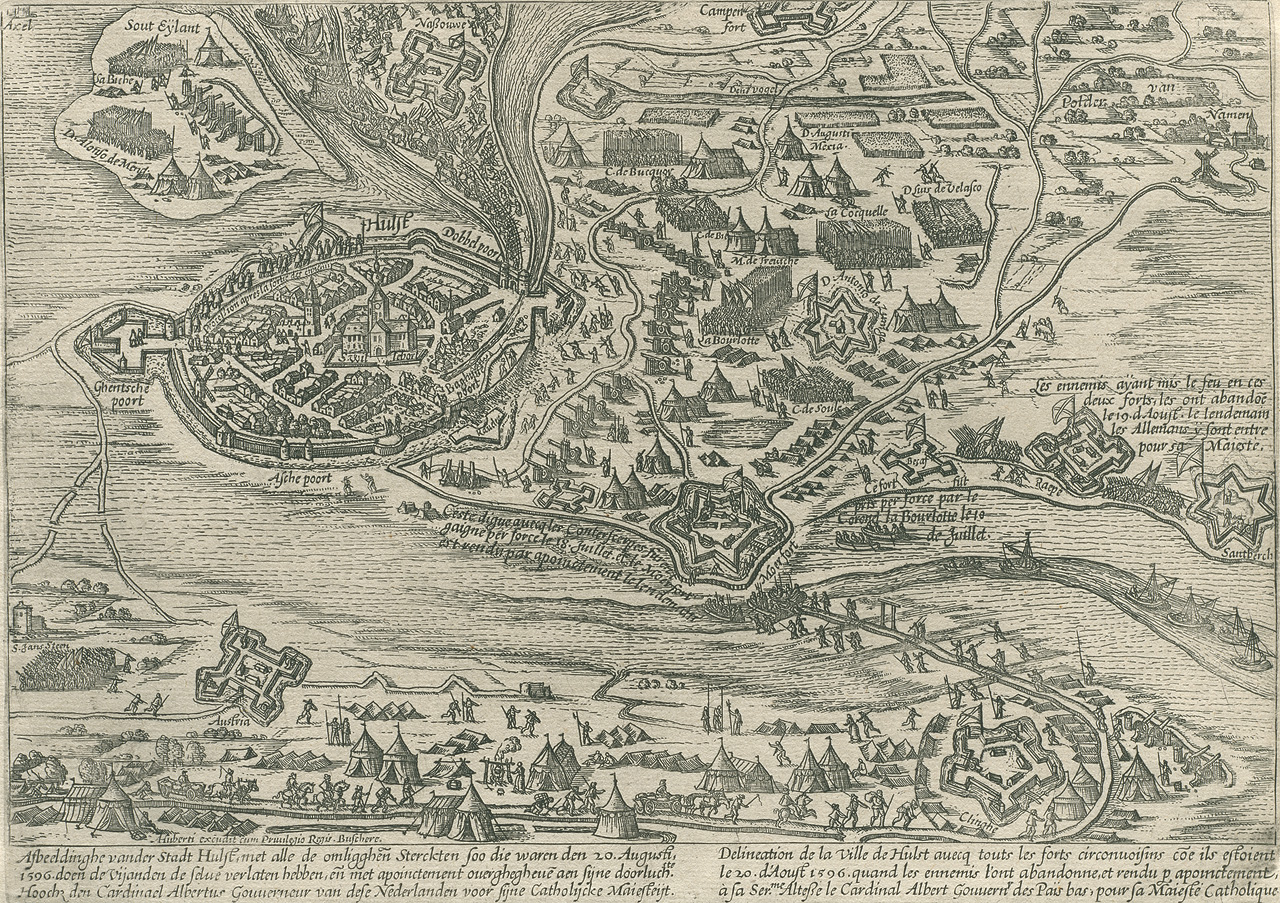
- Engraving of the siege of Hulst of 1596 by Frans Hogenberg – collection Rijksmuseum Amsterdam
Date	Middle of July –18 August 1596
Location	Hulst, Zeeland, Low Countries (present-day the Netherlands) 51°18′57″N 4°03′14″E
Result	Spanish victory

Belligerents
Dutch Republic; England	(Spain) Spanish Empire

Commanders and leaders
(Dutch Republic) Count of Solms (Dutch Republic) Maurice of Nassau (Dutch Republic) William Louis of Nassau-Dillenburg	(Spain) Archduke Albert (Spain) Manuel de Vega (Spain) Luis de Velasco

Strength
Hulst: 3,700; Relief forces: 7,000	12,000 to 15,000

Casualties and losses
500 killed or wounded 3,000 surrendered	1,300 to 2,000 dead 800 to 3,000 wounded
- Location within Zeeland Siege of Hulst (1596) (Netherlands)

The siege of Hulst of 1596 took place between mid-July and August 18, 1596, at the city of Hulst, Province of Zeeland, Low Countries (present-day the Netherlands), during the Eighty Years' War, the Anglo-Spanish War (1585–1604). The siege was won by the Spanish forces of the Archduke of Austria. After a short siege, during which Maurice of Orange launched a failed attempt to relieve the city, the garrison of Dutch and English troops fell into Spanish hands on August 18, 1596.

== Background ==
From 1590 to 1594 the Dutch under the leadership of Maurice of Orange achieved great military successes and expanded their territory, capturing numerous strategic towns and cities, including Hulst. In 1595 Maurice commenced a campaign with the objective to expel the Spanish troops from all cities north of the Rhine in the east of the Netherlands. However, at the siege of Groenlo Cristóbal de Mondragón arrived with a relief force, forcing Maurice to break up the siege. The following year began badly for the Dutch and English as the important port Calais fell to Spain after the French garrison surrendered. The Spanish under Albert of Austria returned to Flanders and conducted a counter offensive and was solicited by the burghers of Bruges to lay siege to Ostend with an offer of 1,200,000 guilders towards the expenses. This however was not to be as Maurice had heavily reinforced the garrison with fresh troops and supplies.

Albert's force marched from Antwerp past the Scheldt and into Brabant with nearly 15,000 infantry and cavalry under their new commander, Sieur de Rosne, a French refugee who had replaced Francisco Verdugo and Mondragón, both of whom had died. Albert was indecisive about whether to besiege Bergen op Zoom or Breda. Nevertheless, Albert had in fact worked up a ruse and to the Dutch there was confusion about where he would strike. Maurice's small depleted army of 5,000 went to Brabant – the vast majority of the veteran English and Scottish regiments, 4,000 in all under Sir Francis Vere were at Cádiz which they were sacking. The Dutch public however funded enough money for some 2,000 soldiers. With Maurice's army thinly stretched Albert realised he could strike at Hulst without hindrance.

== Siege ==
Albert marched towards Hulst, avoiding any contact with Maurice's army and soon invested it. Hulst, a small but strong town commanding the Waasland of Flanders, had been captured in 1591 by an Anglo-Dutch force under Maurice. The garrison had built several sconces, and defences were made more complete by a system of sluices through which the country around could be laid under water. The moat had been deepened but the walls were only partially repaired.

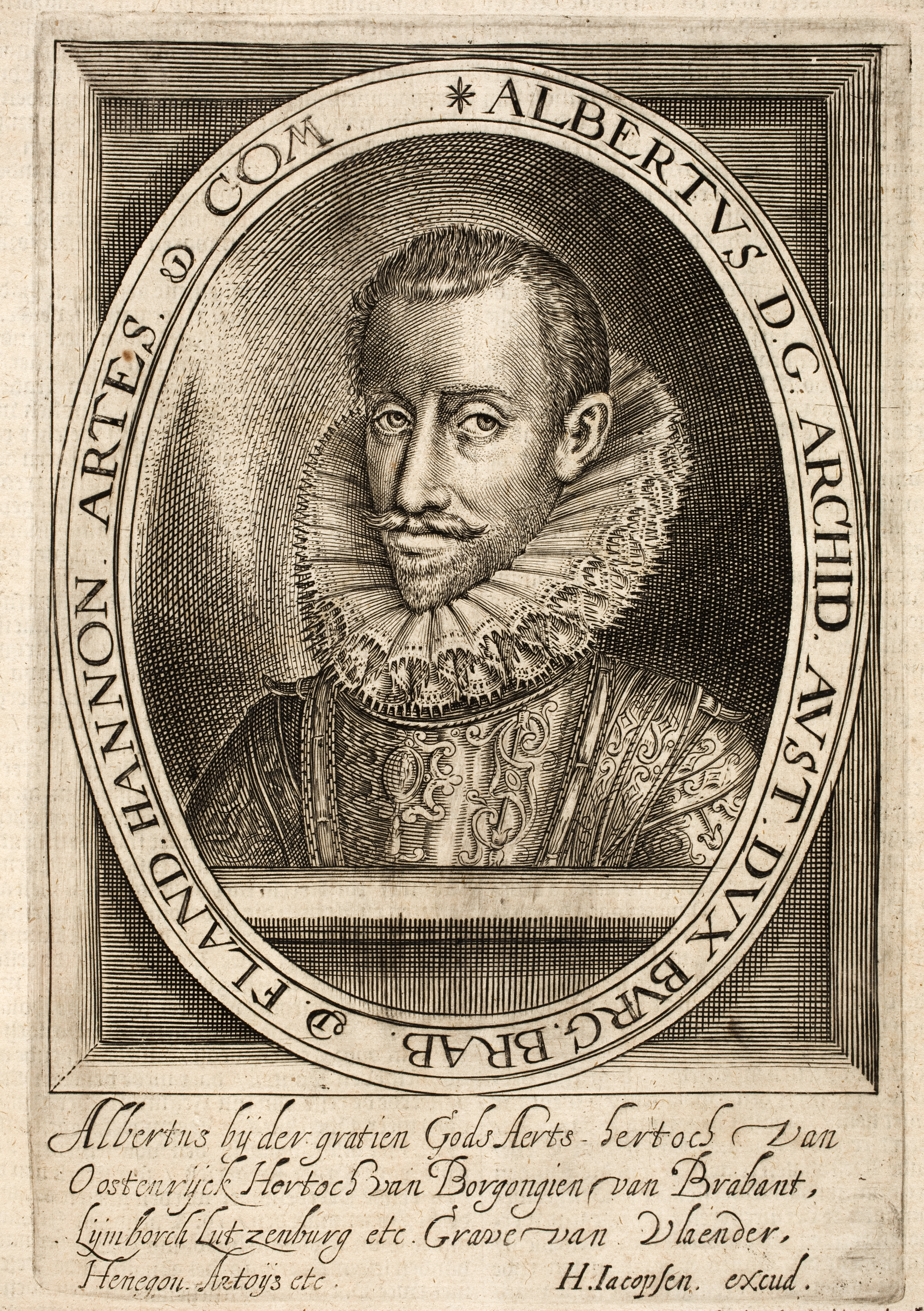
Albert VII, Archduke of Austria. Print by Hugo Grotius

Albert's successful ruse however had much of Holland in panic but Maurice's army soon learned of Albert's intention to take Hulst and marched towards the town. The Dutch were hoping for a long siege and had enough supplies for seven months and under the veteran Georg Eberhard the Count von Solms were to hold it at all costs.

In spite of the resistance offered by the besieged who made several highly successful sallies – the archduke succeeded in gaining possession of the principal dyke and a strong fort called the Moer which enabled him to dig closer to the walls. The losses in the archdukes camp however were high and after only six weeks his casualties had topped nearly 600 with thousands more sick or dead to disease. In addition, de Rosne the Spanish army commander was killed during a sally by the garrison. The fire from the Spanish artillery was furious; after sending nearly 1,500 cannonballs they were able to make a large breach. The garrison expected an assault but instead Albert summoned the garrison commanded by the Count of Solms to surrender or expect an immediate assault. This was refused but the besiegers, instead of commencing the assault, began to work a mine under the wall. This soon unlocked the will of the minds of the garrison as well as the inhabitants and with nearly 700 losses mostly to disease, this fear of an impending assault to ensure their destruction resulted in a panic.

Maurice along with William Louis had approached Hulst, but Count Von Solms under pressure from the citizens had already asked to surrender the city. Maurice did, however, at first attempt to relieve the city, but failed owing to the strong defences, and soon withdrew. Even the Spanish were surprised that the city wanted to surrender, and on August 18, 1596 Albert readily granted the most favourable terms to the 3,000 strong garrison.

== Aftermath ==
For the archduke the victory was costly: sixty officers and 5000 men had perished, mostly from disease. Hulst had been badly battered and had nearly 3,500 cannonballs hurled in and at the city.

The Zealanders were so dissatisfied with the conduct of the Count of Solms that they dismissed him from the command of their troops. The success made sure that Albert had gained the respect of King Philip II and as a result had broken a chain of defeats that they had sustained earlier in the decade, both in France and the Netherlands. The city would remain in Spanish hands until 4 November 1645 when the place was captured by Prince of Orange.

With this defeat the Republic then feared a Spanish siege of the cities of Axel and Biervliet. However, after his severe losses, Albert did not have enough troops to continue his march and withdrew to Flanders; the Republic heard the news via the interception of a letter to Philip. The Dutch were relieved, and thus Maurice now had the advantage of the return of English troops back from their success at Cádiz. He was able to launch a successful offensive the following year, the first of which was the defeat of the Spanish Tercios at the Battle of Turnhout.

== Bibliography ==
- Giménez Martín, Juan. Tercios de Flandes. Ediciones Falcata Ibérica. First edition 1999, Madrid. ISBN 84-930446-0-1 (in Spanish)
- Miguel Ángel Guill Ortega. Carlos Coloma: 1566-1637, espada y pluma de los tercios. Editorial Club Universitario, Spain. ISBN 978-84-8454-580-4 (in Spanish)
- Duerloo, Luc (2012). Dynasty and Piety: Archduke Albert (1598–1621) and Habsburg Political Culture in an Age of Religious Wars. shgate Publishing, Ltd. ISBN 9781409443759.
- Edmundson, George (2013). History of Holland. Digi-Media-Apps. ISBN 9781782875758.
- Hart, Marjolein 't (2014). The Dutch Wars of Independence: Warfare and Commerce in the Netherlands 1570–1680 Modern Wars In Perspective. Routledge. ISBN 9781317812548.
- Robert Jacobus Fruin (1861). Tien jaren uit den tachtigjarigen oorlog, 1588-1598. Martinus Nijhoff, Den Haag 1899. (in Dutch)
- Meskens, Ad (2013). Practical mathematics in a commercial metropolis: Mathematical life in late 16th century Antwerp. Springer Science & Business Media. ISBN 9789400757219.
- Tex, Jan Den (1973). 1606–1619, Volume 2. CUP Archive. ISBN 9780521084291.
- 't Hart, Marjolein (2014). The Dutch Wars of Independence: Warfare and Commerce in the Netherlands 1570–1680. Abingdon: Routledge. ISBN 978-0-415-73422-6.
- van Nimwegen, Olaf (2010). The Dutch Army and the Military Revolutions, 1588–1688 Volume 31 of Warfare in History Series. Boydell & Brewer. ISBN 9781843835752.
- van der Hoeven, Marco (1997). Exercise of Arms: Warfare in the Netherlands, 1568–1648. BRILL. ISBN 9789004107274.
- Wernham, R. B (2000). List and Analysis of State Papers: January to December 1596 Volume 7. National Archives (PRO). ISBN 9781873162651.
