= Gmina Wilczęta =

Gmina Wilczęta Wilczęta Commune
- Gmina
- Coat of arms
- Interactive map of Gmina Wilczęta
- Coordinates (Wilczęta): 54°9′33″N 19°53′7″E
- Country: Poland
- Voivodeship: Warmian-Masurian
- County: Braniewo
- Seat: Wilczęta

Area
  - Total: 147.99 km^{2} (57.14 sq mi)

Population (2006)
  - Total: 3,153
  - Density: 21.31/km^{2} (55.18/sq mi)
- Time zone: UTC+1 (CET)
  - Summer (DST): UTC+2 (CEST)
- Vehicle registration: NBR

Gmina Wilczęta is a rural gmina (administrative district) in Braniewo County, Warmian-Masurian Voivodeship, in northern Poland. Its seat is the village of Wilczęta, which lies approximately 26 kilometres (16 mi) south of Braniewo and 58 km (36 mi) north-west of the regional capital Olsztyn.

The gmina covers an area of 147.99 square kilometres (57.1 sq mi), and as of 2006 its total population is 3,153.

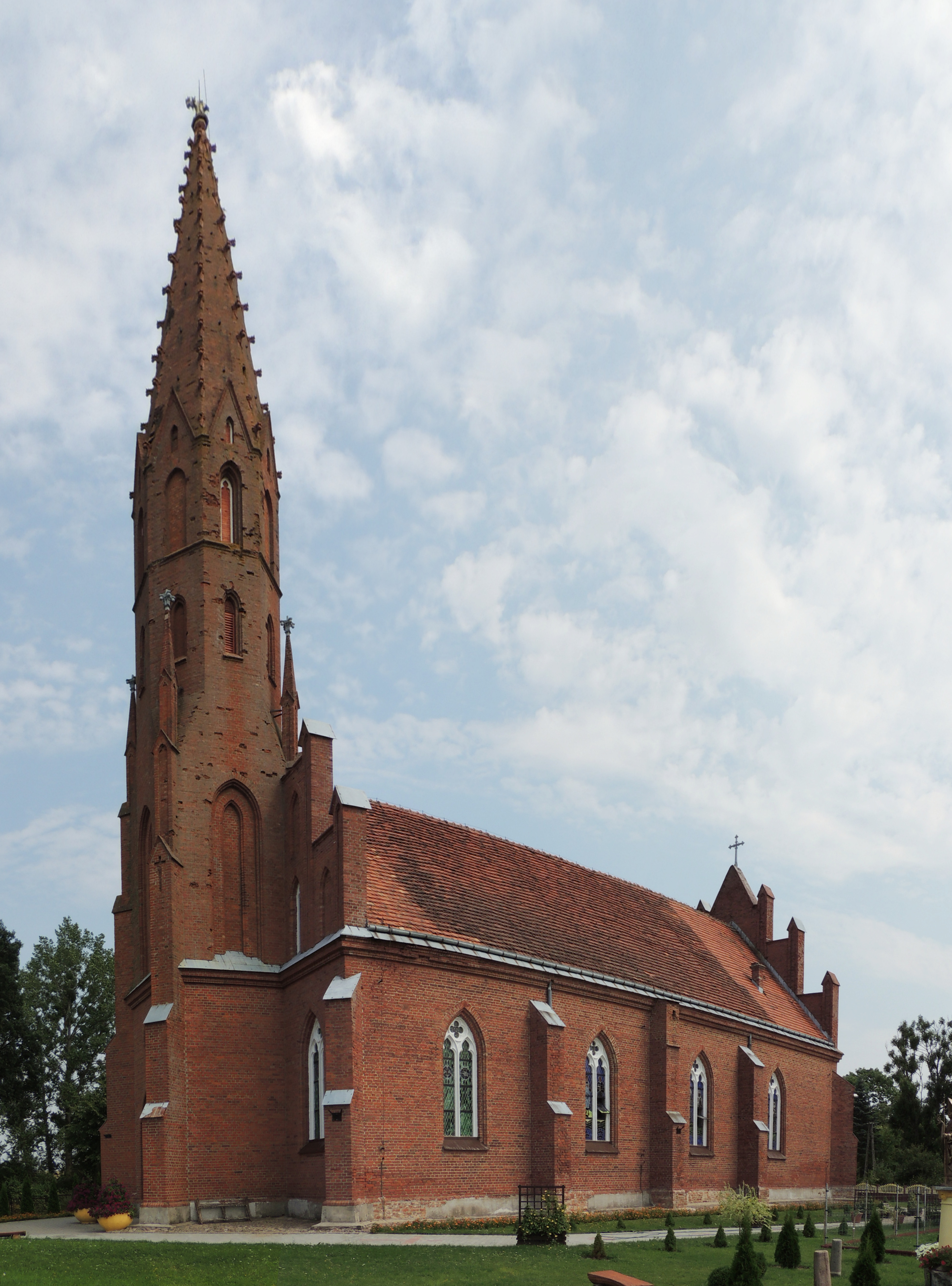
Church of the Resurrection of Christ in Słobity

== Villages ==
Gmina Wilczęta contains the villages and settlements of Bardyny, Bronki, Chmielówka, Dębień, Dębiny, Gładysze, Górski Las, Góry, Jankówko, Karpówek, Karwiny, Księżno, Ławki, Lipowa, Nowica, Słobity, Słobity-Stacja Kolejowa, Sopoty, Sośnica, Spędy, Stare Siedlisko, Tatarki and Wilczęta.

== Neighbouring gminas ==
Gmina Wilczęta is bordered by the gminas of Godkowo, Młynary, Orneta, Pasłęk and Płoskinia.
