= Triple Alliance (1668) =

Defensive treaty between England, the Dutch Republic and Sweden

The Triple Alliance
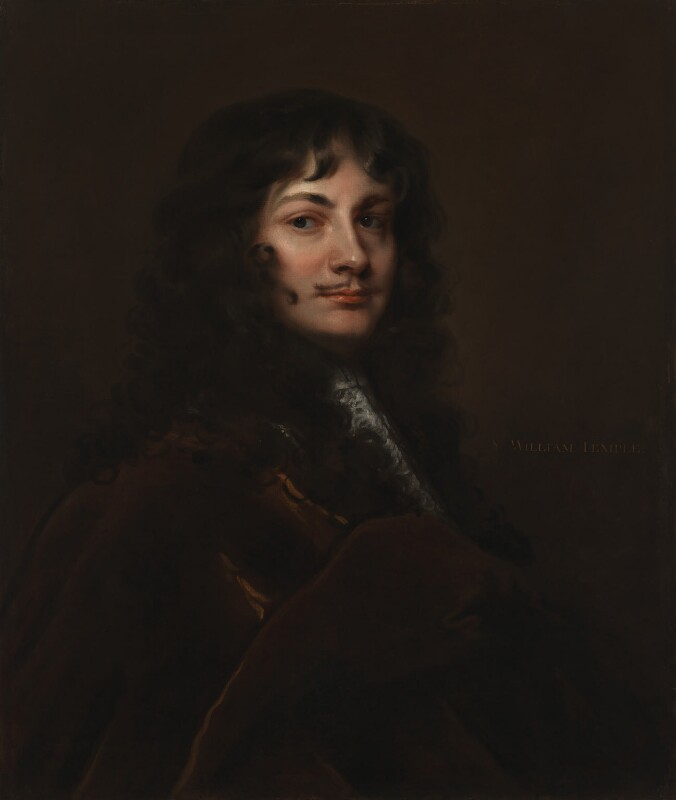
- Sir William Temple, English ambassador in the Hague and driving force behind the Alliance
- Context: England, the Dutch Republic and Sweden agree to a pact of mutual support
- Signed: 23 January 1668; England, Dutch Republic; 25 April 1668; Sweden
- Location: The Hague 23 January 1668; London 5 May 1668
- Mediators: (Holy Roman Empire) François-Paul de Lisola
- Negotiators: (Kingdom of England) Sir William Temple; (Dutch Republic) Johan de Witt; (Swedish Empire) Count Dohna
- Signatories: (Kingdom of England) Charles II of England; (Dutch Republic) Johan de Witt; (Swedish Empire) Count Dohna
- Parties: England; Dutch Republic; Swedish Empire

The Triple Alliance (Dutch: Triple Alliantie; Swedish: Trippelalliansen) was signed by the Kingdom of England, the Swedish Empire and the Dutch Republic in May 1668. It was created in response to the occupation of the Spanish Netherlands and Franche-Comté by France. Although Spain and Emperor Leopold were not signatories, they were closely involved in the negotiations.

It consisted of three separate agreements: a defensive alliance, an undertaking to oblige Spain and France to make peace, and secret clauses that included mediating an end to the war between Spain and Portugal and enforcing the peace by military action if required.

By 1663, Louis XIV had accepted that French and Dutch objectives in the Low Countries were incompatible and used the Second Anglo-Dutch War to launch the War of Devolution in May 1667. He and Leopold were co-heirs to Charles of Spain, and in January 1668, they signed a treaty that divided the Spanish Empire if Charles died without an heir, and it awarded Louis the Spanish Netherlands and set the terms of the Treaty of Aix-la-Chapelle.

The alliance was short-lived since both Sweden and England backed France at the outset of the Franco-Dutch War four years later, but it marked the point at which England and the Dutch came to see France as a common threat. That made it the forerunner of the Grand Alliance, which fought the 1688-1697 Nine Years' War and the 1701-1714 War of the Spanish Succession.

== Background ==
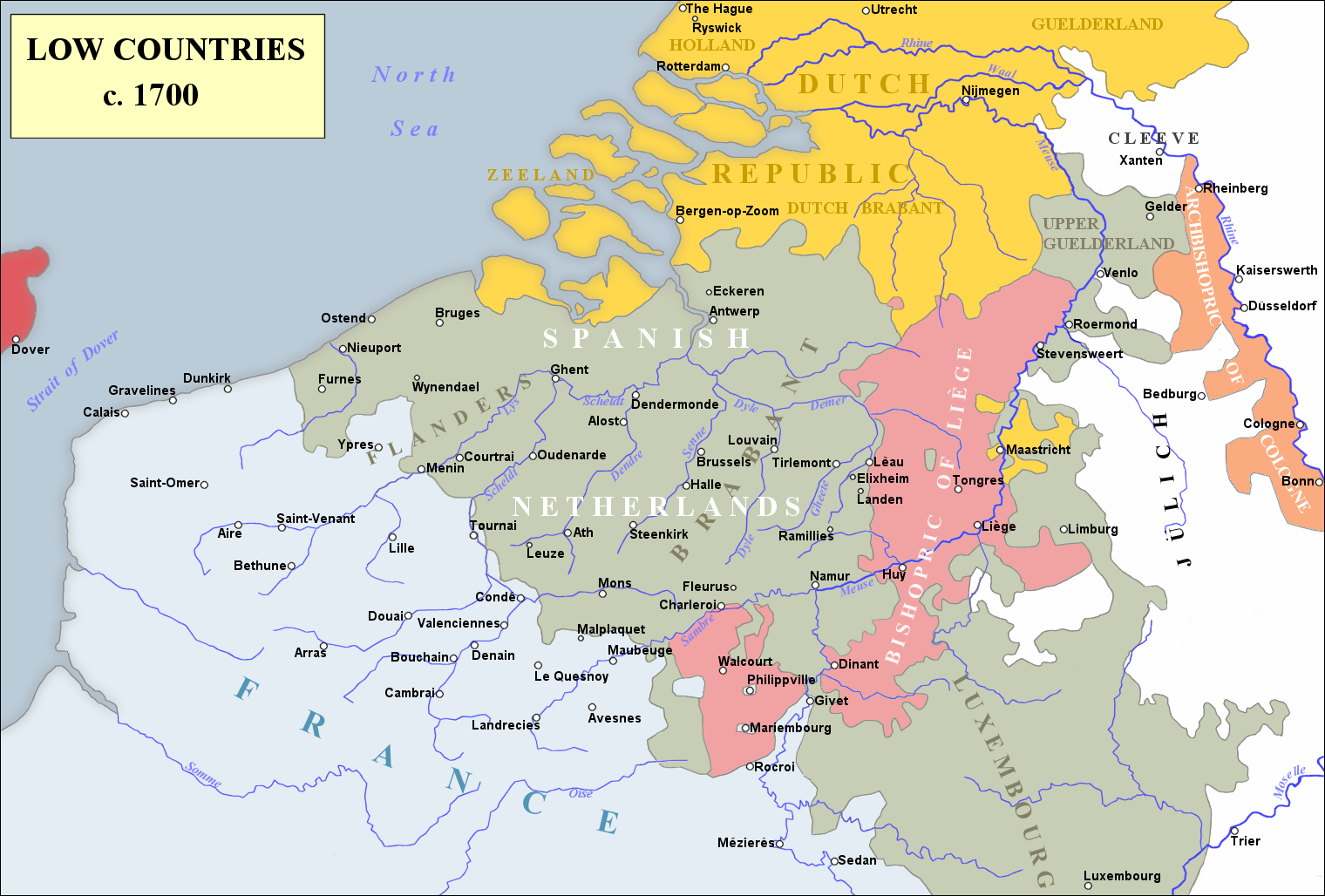
The Low Countries c. 1700; French expansion in this area threatened both England and the Dutch Republic.

As part of the 1659 Treaty of the Pyrenees that ended the Franco-Spanish War, Louis XIV of France married Maria Theresa of Spain, eldest daughter of Philip IV of Spain. Despite being weakened by nearly a century of conflict, the Spanish Empire remained a huge global confederation. To prevent its acquisition by France, Maria Theresa renounced her inheritance rights and in return Louis was promised a dowry of 500,000 gold écus, a huge sum that was never paid.

In 1661, French Finance Minister Jean-Baptiste Colbert argued economic growth required possession of the Spanish Netherlands and the port of Antwerp. Acquisition would give France control of its own export trade, currently dominated by the Dutch Republic, a long-time ally. However, this implied conflict with Spain, Emperor Leopold as well as the Dutch. The 1648 Peace of Münster that confirmed independence from Spain shut the Scheldt estuary, closing Antwerp and making Amsterdam the richest commercial city in North Western Europe. Keeping it shut was a Dutch priority.

By 1663, Louis had concluded the States General of the Netherlands would never voluntarily agree to concessions and began planning to seize the area by force. As required by the 1662 Franco-Dutch Treaty of Paris, France entered the Second Anglo-Dutch War in July 1665; this gave Louis an excuse to expand his army, while he also calculated it would make harder for the Dutch to oppose him.

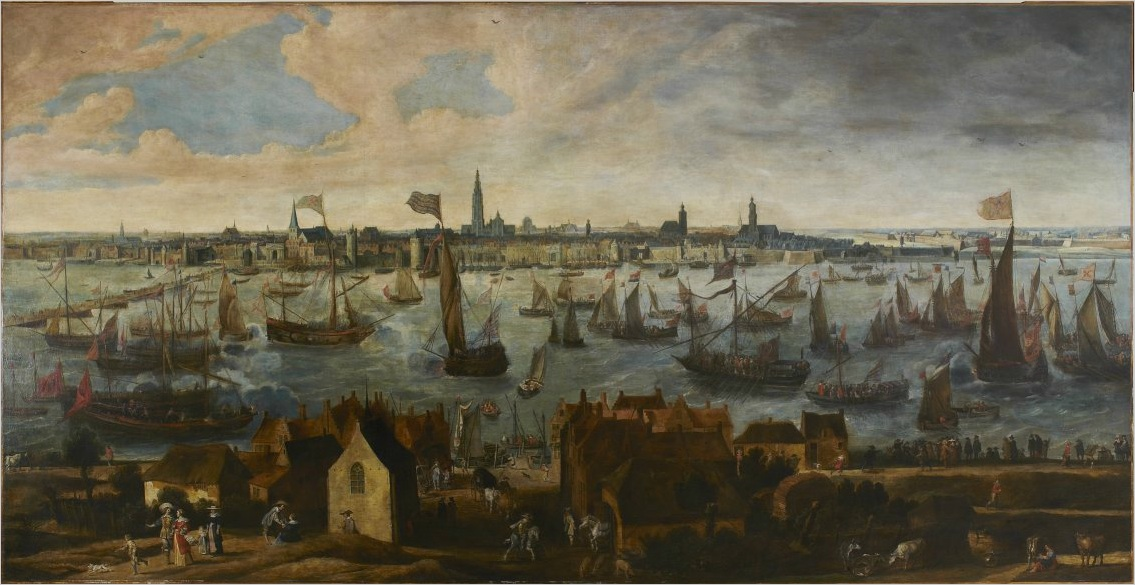
Antwerp, c. 1645, whose closure in 1648 made Amsterdam the richest port in Europe; keeping it shut brought the Dutch into conflict with France.

In September, Philip died, leaving his four-year-old son Charles II of Spain as king, and his widow, Mariana of Austria, as regent. Louis argued since the dowry remained unpaid, Maria Theresa's renunciation was invalid and so her rights "devolved" to him under the Jus Devolutionis, an obscure law restricting inheritance to children from a first marriage. He used it to claim much of the Spanish Netherlands. In April 1666, Charles' sister Margaret Theresa married Emperor Leopold; this meant on his death, Leopold would inherit the entire Spanish Empire.

Talks on ending the Anglo-Dutch War opened in Breda in May 1667. Louis launched the War of Devolution on 24 May, and by September, his troops had occupied much of the Spanish Netherlands. On 27 May, the Treaty of Madrid ended the 1654-1660 Anglo-Spanish War, and England agreed to mediate an end to the Portuguese Restoration War in return for commercial concessions. The Dutch raid on the Medway in June forced England to agree to the Treaty of Breda on 31 July, and negotiations then began between the two countries for a common front against France.

== Negotiations ==
For De Witt, the French alliance secured his position against the Orangist opposition and ensured Dutch economic supremacy. By 1667, the prospect of France replacing Spain as a neighbour meant that most of the States General and the Dutch populace saw an English alliance as essential for mutual survival. Although Charles preferred France as an ally, he viewed Breda as a personal humiliation and blamed Louis, who failed to deliver on a promise to ensure that the Dutch accepted English terms. This perspective was widely shared by his advisors, including chief minister Lord Arlington, many of whom also viewed Spain as a better ally than France. Losses from war and the Great Fire of London meant both Parliament and the City of London wanted peace, which seemed best achieved by partnering with the Dutch.

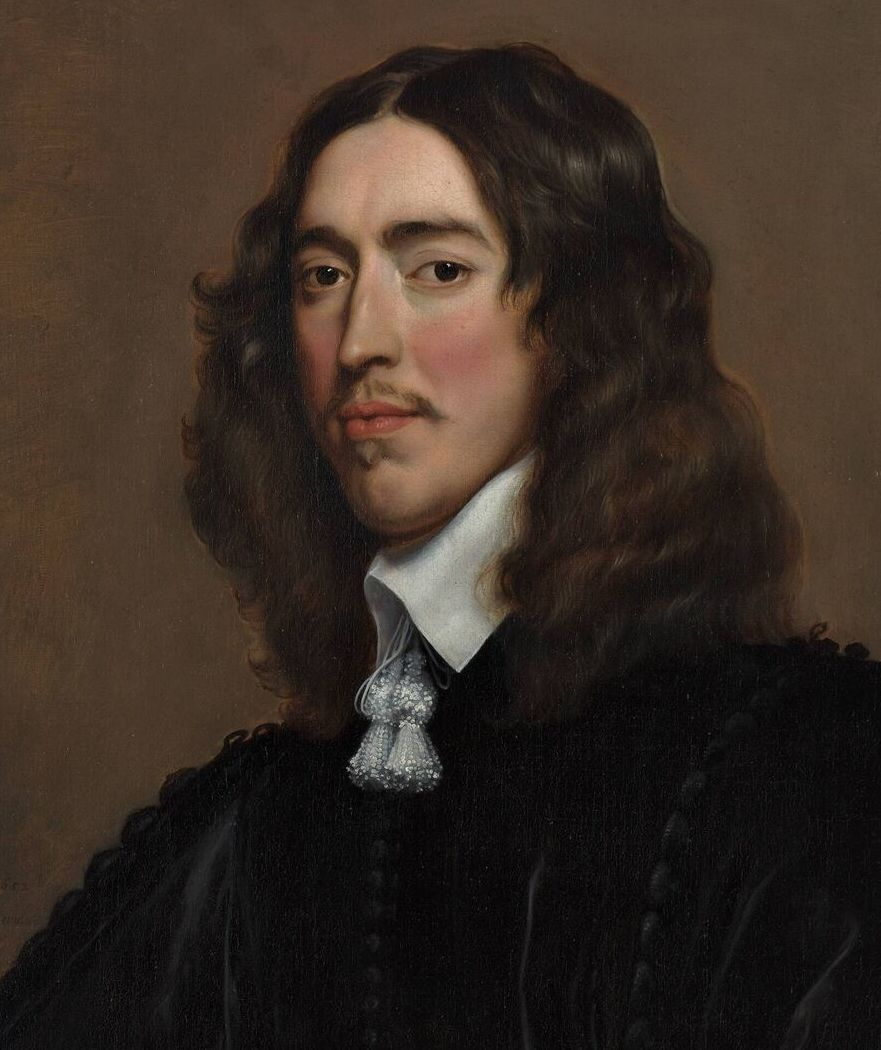
Johan de Witt, Grand Pensionary from 1653 to 1672; although the treaty was seen as a Dutch triumph, he recognised the danger of antagonising Louis XIV

Negotiations were led by Sir William Temple, English ambassador in The Hague and Brussels, who viewed French expansion as a bigger threat than Dutch economic strength. He was supported by François-Paul de Lisola; he served as an imperial diplomat in London from 1667 to 1668 and The Hague from 1669 to 1673. Historian and political theorist Mark Goldie views Lisola's 1667 work 'The Buckler of State and Justice' as a key document in establishing France as England's enemy, rather than Spain.

In September, De Witt asked Louis his conditions for withdrawing from the Spanish Netherlands and offered to mediate with Spain to ensure their acceptance. Louis agreed, but only if the Dutch enforced them on both parties; this meant when Spain rejected his terms, the States of Holland passed resolutions on 10 December and 14 January 1668, approving military support for France. On 20 January 1668, Louis and Leopold agreed to a secret Partition Treaty, dividing the Spanish Empire if Charles died.

The French ambassador, Godefroi, Comte d'Estrades, was well-informed on negotiations for the Alliance and assured Louis that he could delay approval by bribes. However, Temple persuaded the States General to approve it before asking the provincial bodies although normal practice was the other way around. Once the States General announced their decision, public enthusiasm was so great that no one dared take d'Estrades' money. On 23 January 1668, the Alliance was signed by England and the Republic. Seeking to widen the coalition, Temple invited Sweden to join; it had signed a treaty with the Dutch in July 1667 and controlled the Baltic trade in pitch and timber, essential for shipbuilding.

== Terms ==
The Alliance contained three separate elements; a defensive alliance, a guarantee of terms for ending the War of Devolution and secret clauses. Spain was held partially responsible for the war by arranging the 1666 marriage between Leopold and Margaret Theresa and so had to bear some of the cost. As agreed in September, France would withdraw from the Spanish Netherlands but retain Lille, Armentières, Bergues, Douai Tournai, Oudenaarde, Kortrijk, Veurne, Binche, Charleroi, and Ath.

The Alliance guaranteed to enforce compliance by Spain by a secret clause requiring it to end the war with Portugal. With Louis clearly preparing action, another clause committed to forcing France back to its 1659 boundaries if it continued the war. The English Parliament approved £300,000 if needed, and the States General activated 48 warships, and the recruitment of 18,000 additional troops. As a condition of signing, Sweden demanded reimbursement of 480,000 rixdollars, costs incurred for its attempt to capture Bremen in 1666, which it claimed was for the benefit of Spain. The Dutch and the English refused to pay and passed the obligation onto Spain; after protracted debate, Sweden signed on 5 May (NS), bringing together the three major powers in the Baltic and North Sea.

== Aftermath ==
French troops entered Franche-Comté on 5 February; two weeks later, its conquest was complete and Louis decided to make peace. The cost of the war was far higher than expected, while Charles of Spain was reportedly close to death; if so, his agreement with Leopold meant Louis might achieve his objectives without fighting. In April, he met with English and Dutch representatives at Saint Germain to agree to terms, which were used at Aix-la-Chapelle in May. In Article 6, the Dutch and English undertook to enforce them if Spain did not comply, mirroring the 'secret' clause of the alliance against France. In reality, there was no English support for war with Spain on behalf of France or the Dutch, especially given the commercial terms of the 1667 Treaty of Madrid; besides, the Royal Navy was in no state to fight a war.

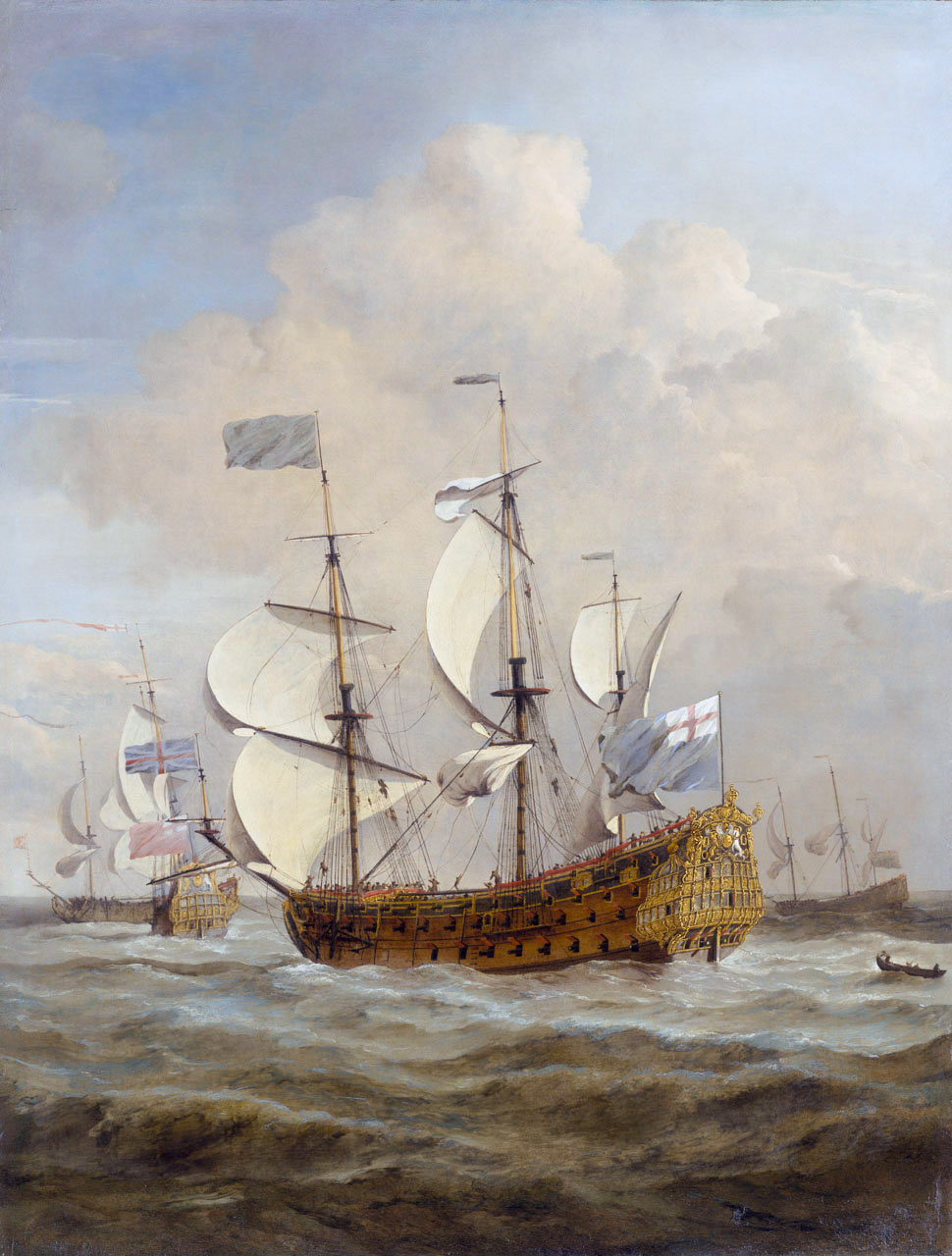
HMS St Andrew; launched in 1670 as part of an expansion of the Royal Navy, intended to provide military support for the Triple Alliance

In the short term, the Triple Alliance was undermined by diverging interests. De Witt and Charles saw it as a way to improve their bargaining position with Louis, a perspective at odds with domestic opinion in both countries, which was strongly anti-French. In addition, the English were pro-peace, rather than pro-Dutch, and unresolved commercial disputes resulted in the Third Anglo-Dutch War. For Sweden, it was an opportunity to replace its regional rival Denmark-Norway as the primary Dutch ally in the Baltic, and end concessions imposed by the 1656 Treaty of Elbing.

However, the treaty marked the end of the longstanding Franco-Dutch alliance and the first step in creating the anti-French coalition that continued until the end of the War of the Spanish Succession in 1714. The balance of power concept advocated by Temple had two important implications for English policy: the ability to enforce it and a network of allies. From 1668 to 1674, Parliament voted large sums to strengthen the Royal Navy, and English diplomacy began to focus on powers like Sweden, Brandenburg and Denmark, instead of only Spain, the Dutch, France or the Holy Roman Empire.

De Witt hoped the threat of the Triple Alliance would force Louis to moderate his demands, but it simply showed the limits of his ability to control the States General. The Treaties of Breda and the Alliance were viewed as Dutch diplomatic triumphs, but while although De Witt understood the danger of thwarting French ambitions, he failed to convince his colleagues. Louis now decided the best way to acquire the Spanish Netherlands was to defeat the Dutch and began preparations for the 1672-1678 Franco-Dutch War.

== Sources ==
- Cowans, Jon (2003). Modern Spain: A Documentary History. U. of Pennsylvania Press. ISBN 0-8122-1846-9.
- Davenport, Frances Gardiner; Paullin, Charles Oscar, eds. (1917). European Treaties Bearing on the History of the United States and Its Dependencies, Vol. 2: 1650–1697 (2018 ed.). Forgotten Books. ISBN 978-0483158924.
- De Périni, Hardÿ (1896). Batailles françaises, Volume V. Ernest Flammarion.
- Durant, Ariel; Durant, Will (1963). Age of Louis XIV (Story of Civilization). TBS Publishing. ISBN 0207942277.
- Geyl, P (1936). "Johan de Witt, Grand Pensionary of Holland, 1653–72". History. 20 (80): 303–319. doi:10.1111/j.1468-229X.1936.tb00103.x. JSTOR 24401084.
- Goldie, M; Levillain, Charles-Edouard (2018). "Francois-Paul de Lisola and English Opposition to Louis XIV". Historical Journal. doi:10.17863/CAM.35128.
- Gooskens, Frans (2016). Sweden and the Treaty of Breda in 1667 – Swedish diplomats help to end naval warfare between the Dutch Republic and England (PDF). De Oranje-boom; Historical and Archeology Circle of the City and Country of Breda.
- Grainger, John (2014). The British Navy in the Baltic. Boydell Press. ISBN 978-1843839477.
- Hull, Isabel V. (2014). A Scrap of Paper: Breaking and Making International Law during the Great War. Cornell University Press. ISBN 978-0801470646.
- Hutton, Richard (1986). "The Making of the Secret Treaty of Dover, 1668–1670". The Historical Journal. 29 (2): 297–318. doi:10.1017/S0018246X00018756. S2CID 159787254.
- Israel, Jonathan (1990) [1989]. Dutch Primacy in World Trade, 1585–1740. Oxford University Press. ISBN 978-0198211396.
- Lee, Maurice D (1961). "The Earl of Arlington and the Treaty of Dover". Journal of British Studies. 1 (1): 58–70. doi:10.1086/385435. JSTOR 175099. S2CID 159658912.
- Lesaffer, Randall. "The Wars of Louis XIV in Treaties (Part II): The Peace Treaty of Aachen [Aix-la-Chapelle] (2 May 1668)". OPIL.
- Lynn, John (1996). The Wars of Louis XIV, 1667–1714 (Modern Wars in Perspective). Longman. ISBN 978-0582056299.
- Macintosh, Claude Truman (1973). French Diplomacy during the War of Devolution, the Triple Alliance and the Treaty of Aix-la-Chapelle (PhD thesis). Ohio State University. Archived from the original on 2023-07-09.
- Newitt, Malyn (2004). A History of Portuguese Overseas Expansion 1400–1668. Routledge. ISBN 978-1134553044.
- Rommelse, Gijs (2006). The Second Anglo-Dutch War (1665–1667). Verloren. ISBN 978-9065509079.
- Rowen, Herbert H. (1954). "John de Witt and the Triple Alliance". The Journal of Modern History. 26 (1): 1–14. doi:10.1086/237659. S2CID 145695238.
- Sheehan, Michael (1995). The Balance Of Power: History & Theory. Routledge. ISBN 978-0415119313.
- Van Nimwegen, Olaf (2010). The Dutch Army and the Military Revolutions, 1588–1688 (Warfare in History). Boydell Press. ISBN 978-1843835752.
- Wolf, John (1968). Louis XIV. Littlehampton Book Services Ltd. ISBN 978-0575000889.
