= Sośnica, Warmian-Masurian Voivodeship =

Sośnica
- Settlement
- Location within Poland
- Coordinates: 54°12′3″N 19°52′16″E
- Country: Poland
- Voivodeship: Warmian-Masurian
- County: Braniewo
- Gmina: Wilczęta

Sośnica [sɔɕˈnit͡sa] is a settlement in the administrative district of Gmina Wilczęta, within Braniewo County, Warmian-Masurian Voivodeship, in northern Poland.
