= François-Paul de Lisola =

French diplomat and pamphleteer

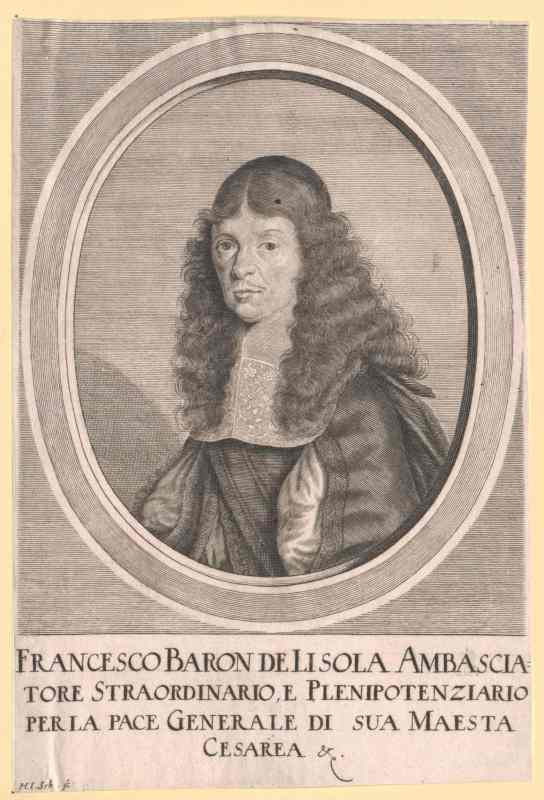
François-Paul de Lisola (1870)

Baron François-Paul de Lisola (Franz Paul Freiherr von Lisola) (22 August 1613 - 19 December 1674) was a seventeenth-century diplomat and pamphleteer from Salins, County of Burgundy. In older English literature, his name is sometimes given as d’Isola.

Bitterly anti-French, he served the Austrian Habsburgs and has been credited by modern historians with helping establish France as England's primary opponent in the so-called Second Hundred Years' War. In the nineteenth-century, following the Franco-Prussian War of 1870-1871, German historians became greatly interested in him and credited him as the creator of the Grand Alliance or League of Augsburg.

== Biography ==
Lisola was born to Jérôme de Lisola, seigneur de Thise, and Suzanne Recy. His family was likely originally from Italy, but his father was born in Lyon. Lisola studied law in Dôle and earned a doctorate. From 1636-1638, he annoyed the authorities of Besançon, leading him to leave France-Comté and enter the service of the Holy Roman Emperor, Ferdinand III. He was first appointed as a representative to the Court of St. James in 1640.

In 1646, Lisola was temporarily involved in the negotiations leading to the Peace of Westphalia, but his virulent anti-French attitude led to his being recalled. He was more successful in negotiations between Leopold I and Frederick William of Prussia in during the Second Northern War (1655-1660). For this, in 1659, Leopold granted him the title of baron. He was later instrumental in arranging Leopold's marriage to the Spanish Infanta, Margaret Theresa, in 1666.

Lisola played a key role in the creation of the Triple Alliance of 1668 between England, the Dutch Republic, and Sweden. He also wrote numerous pamphlets attacking France and Louis XIV, claiming the latter was seeking to dominate Europe and establish a 'universal monarchy.' His most famous and popular pamphlet was the 1667 Bouclier d'Etat et de Justice, which was published in English as 'THE BUCKLER OF State and Justice Against The DESIGN manifestly discovered of the UNIVERSAL MONARCHY, Under the vain PRETEXT OF THE QUEEN of France HER PRETENSIONS.'

== Publications ==
It is unclear how many of the works attributed to Lisola were actually written by him. Pierre Bayle noted in 1675 that many libellers published under Lisola's name. Works attributed to him include:

- Discours funebre sur la mort de la serenissime Princesse Isabelle Clere Eugenie infante d'Espagne, par Denys Couche, Besançon, 1634.
- Bovclier D'Estat Et De Justice contre le dessein manifestement découvert de la Monarchie Universelle, sous le vain prétexte des prétentions de la reyne de France, Bruxelles, 1667.
- Remarques sur le procédé de la France, touchant la négociation de la paix, 1668.
- Suite des fausses démarches de la France sur la négociation de la paix, 1668.
- Conference sur les interests de l'estat present de l'Angleterre, touchant les desseins de la France, 1668.
- Lettre d'un gentilhomme ligeois, envoyée à l'autheur des remarques, qui servent de réponse à deux escrits imprimez à Bruxelles, contre les droits de la reyne sur le Brabant, Chez Clément Toussaint, Liège, 1668.
- La France démasquée ou ses irregularitez dans sa conduite, et maximes, 1670.
- Discours touchant les prétentions de la France sur les places de Condé, Linch, etc. en vertu du traité d'Aix-la-Chapelle, avec la continuation d'encore un an, chez Jean Laurent, La Haye, 1671.
- Suite du dialogue sur les droits de la reyne très-chréstienne par où se découvre la vanité des prétentions de la France sur les Pays-Bas, & Comté de Bourgogne, 1671.
- Conférence infructueuse de Windischgrätz, ou violence de la France à obtenir la Lorraine avec ce qui s'est passé là-dessus de plus remarquable, chez Louis François, Charleville, 1671.
- Le Politique du temps ou le Conseil fidelle sur les mouvemens de la France, tiré des événemens passez pour servir d'instruction à la Triple Ligue, Charleville, 1671.
- Traité politique sur les mouvemens presens de l'Angleterre contre ses interests, & maximes fondamentales, chez Henry Thomas, Ville-Franche, 1671.
- Eclaircissements sur les affaires de Lorraine pour tous les princes chrestiens, chez Martin Fredrick, 1671.
- Lettres et autres pièces curieuses sur les affaires du temps, rédigées par Lisola, Crampricht et Maximilien-Henri, édité par le marquis de Grana, Amsterdam en 1672.
- Le dénouëment des intrigues du temps, par la responce au livret intitulé, Lettres Lettres et autres pièces curieuses sur les affaires du temps fait par S.I.P.P.B., 1672.
- Mémoire du roi Très Chrétien à l'abbé de Gravel, envoyé par Sa Mté, avec la dépêche, en date du camp de Maeschtricht 18 juin 1673, avec la lettre d'un Conseiller d'Estat d'un prince de l'Empire, escrite à ce sujet au député de son maître à la diète de Ratisbonne, 167.
- Considerations politiques au sujet de la guerre presente entre la France et la Hollande, à Amsterdam, 1673.
- Remarques sur le discours du commandeur de Gremonville, fait au Conseil d'Estat de sa Majesté Impériale, chez Arnout Leere, le fils, 1673.
- Appel de l'Angleterre touchant la secrete Cabale ou Assemblée à Withael à & envers Le Grand Conseil de la Nation se trouvant la Noblesse & la Communeauté assemblée fait en Anglais par un zélateur véritable de sa patrie, chès la vefve de fey Ioseph Bruyninck, Amsterdam, 1673.
- La Sauce au verjus, Strasbourg, 1674.
- Le Politique du temps [par F.-P. de Lisola], avec les remarques nécessaires à sa parfaite intelligence, et une dissertation historique et politique sur l'estat présent de la chrétienté, à quoy on a joint une table des remarques, très curieuse et très commode pour trouver les belles matières qu'elles contiennent, La Haye, 1674.
- L'apologiste réfuté, ou, réponse aux calomnies de Certain prétendant justifier les guerres de France contre les mouvemens et la justice des armes de S.M. Impériale, Martin Lambert, Cologne 1674.
- L'orateur françois ou Harangue de Monsieur l'archevesque d'Ambrun interprétée par les évènements de notre temps et l'estat des affaires présentes, chez Lambert Chocquier, Liège 1674.
- Requeste de Monsieur le baron de Lisola. Présentée à l'Empereur le 4. octobre 1674.
- À Son Altesse Monseigneur le Prince d'Osnabrug, 1674.
- Détention de Guillaume, prince de Furstenberg, nécessaire pour maintenir l'autorité de l'Empereur, la tranquillité de l'Empire et pour procurer une paix juste, utile et nécessaire, 1675.
- Entretiens sur les affaires du temps, Strasbourg, 1674.
