= Dębiny, Warmian-Masurian Voivodeship =

Dębiny
- Village
- Location within Poland
- Coordinates: 54°14′15″N 19°53′42″E
- Country: Poland
- Voivodeship: Warmian-Masurian
- County: Braniewo
- Gmina: Wilczęta
- Population: 81

Dębiny [dɛmˈbinɨ] is a village in the administrative district of Gmina Wilczęta, within Braniewo County, Warmian-Masurian Voivodeship, in northern Poland.

In 2005 the village had a population of 81.
