= Ławki =

Lawki may refer to the following things:

- Ławki, Łódź Voivodeship (central Poland)
- Ławki, Łuków County in Lublin Voivodeship (east Poland)
- Ławki, Gmina Tomaszów Lubelski, Tomaszów County in Lublin Voivodeship (east Poland)
- Ławki, Masovian Voivodeship (east-central Poland)
- Ławki, Greater Poland Voivodeship (west-central Poland)
- Ławki, Braniewo County in Warmian-Masurian Voivodeship (north Poland)
- Ławki, Giżycko County in Warmian-Masurian Voivodeship (north Poland)
- Life as We Knew It (novel), a young adult science fiction novel by American author Susan Beth Pfeffer
