= Karpówek =

- Settlement
- Location within Poland
- Coordinates: 54°8′52″N 19°47′58″E
- Country: Poland
- Voivodeship: Warmian-Masurian
- County: Braniewo
- Gmina: Wilczęta

Karpówek [karˈpuvɛk] is a settlement in the administrative district of Gmina Wilczęta, within Braniewo County, Warmian-Masurian Voivodeship, in northern Poland.
