= Lipowa, Warmian-Masurian Voivodeship =

Lipowa
- Village
- Location within Poland
- Coordinates: 54°10′0″N 19°49′59″E
- Country: Poland
- Voivodeship: Warmian-Masurian
- County: Braniewo
- Gmina: Wilczęta
- Population: 30

Lipowa [liˈpɔva] is a village in the administrative district of Gmina Wilczęta, within Braniewo County, Warmian-Masurian Voivodeship, in northern Poland.
