= Christian Albert, Burgrave and Count of Dohna =

German nobleman (1621–1677)

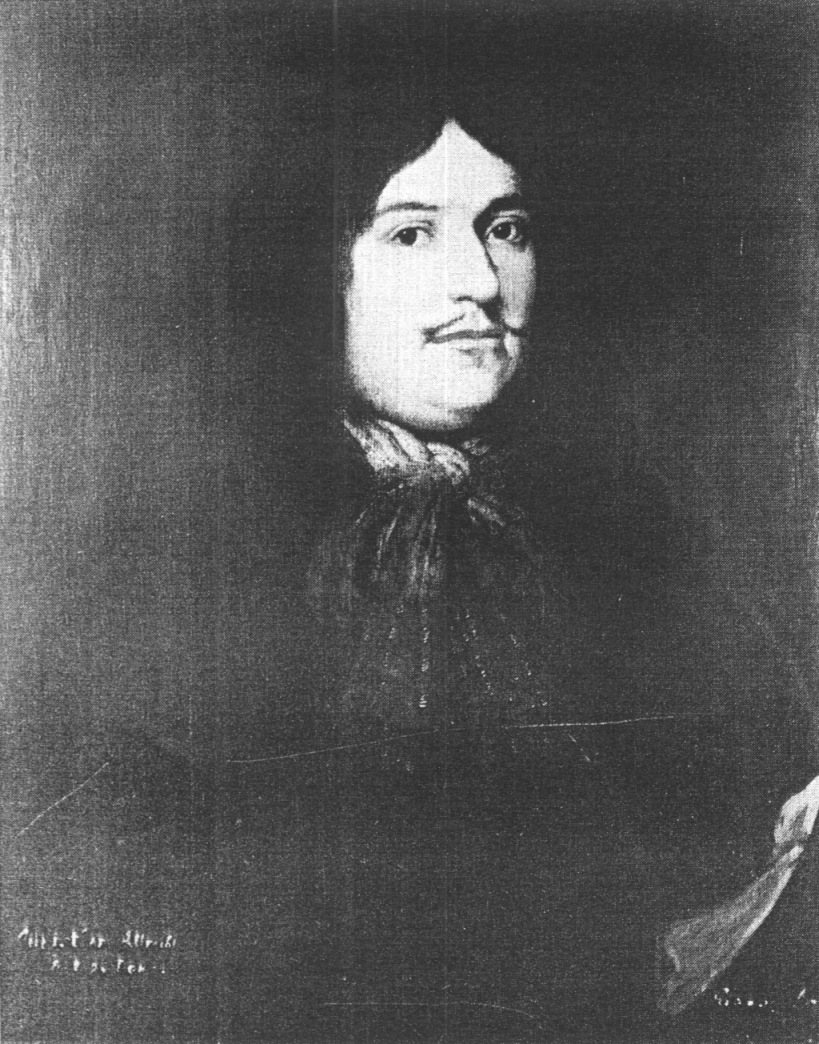
- Christian Albert of Dohna
- Born: 10 December 1621; Küstrin
- Died: 14 December 1677 (aged 56); Gartz
- Noble family: Von Dohna
- Spouse: Sophie Theodore of Brederode-Vianen
- Father: Christopher von Dohna
- Mother: Ursula of Solms-Braunfels

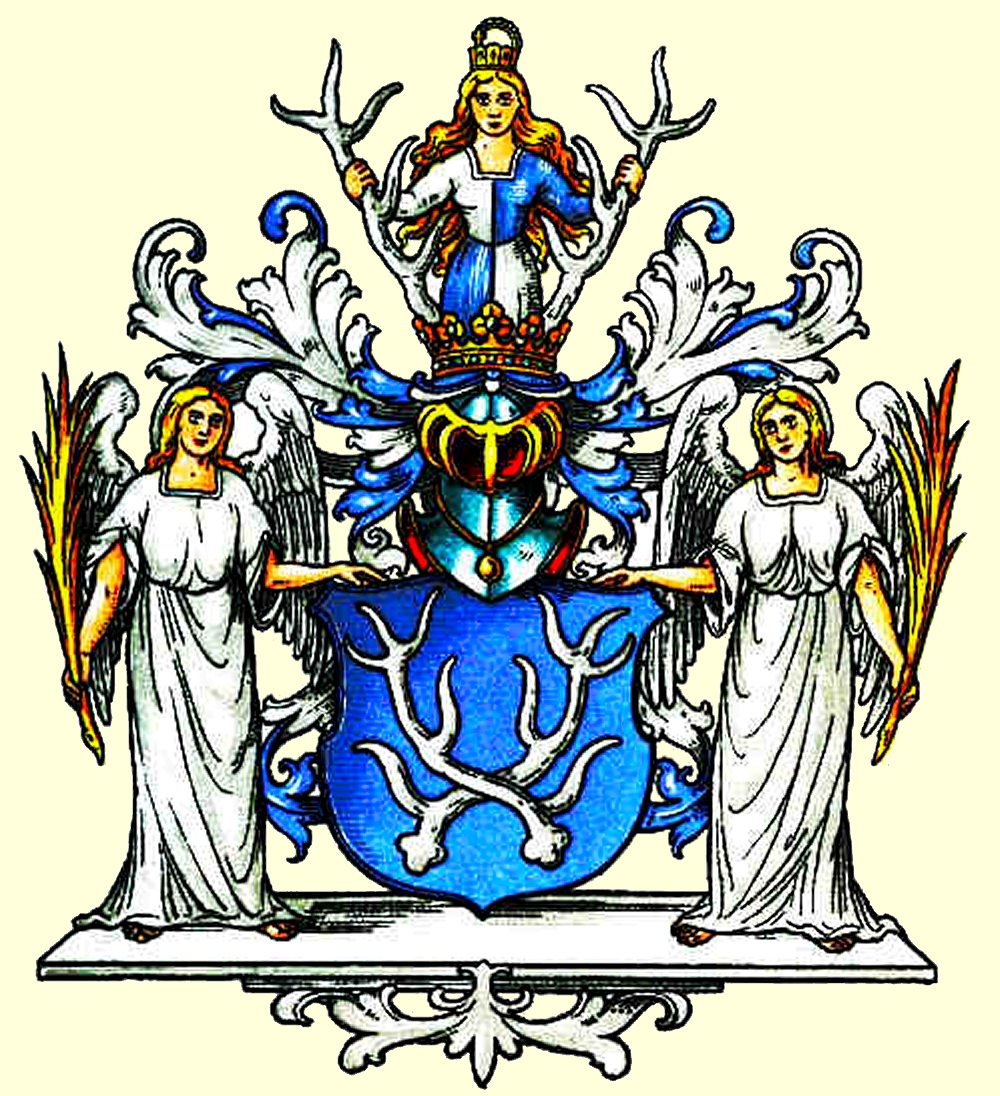
Coat of arms of the Counts of Dohna

Christian Albert, Burgrave and Count of Dohna (also known as Christoph Albert, 10 December 1621 in Küstrin – 14 December 1677 in Gartz) was a German nobleman from the House of Dohna.

== Early life ==
He was the son of Count Christoph von Dohna and his wife, Countess Ursula of Solms-Braunfels (24 November 1594 in Braunfels – 18 August 1657 in Turnhout). His brothers Frederick and Christopher Delphicus also served as army officers. His first cousin Countess Luise Henriette of Nassau was Electress consort of Brandenburg.

== Life ==
He joined the Dutch army, initially serving as ensign. He was educated by Prince Frederick Henry and in 1648, he was promoted to colonel. On 6 October 1656, he became a Lieutenant in the army of Brandenburg. He also served as privy councillor and governor of Küstrin. On 16 March 1657, he became stadtholder of Halberstadt and Captain at Gröningen. In 1659, he participated in a campaign in Pomerania. He expanded the fortresses of Berlin and Küstrin and on 2 March 1666, he was promoted to General of the Infantry. In 1671, he became head of a newly formed regiment in Küstrin that was named after him ("Dohna zu Fuß"). In 1672, he was appointed Feldzeugmeister. From 1675 to 1677, he fought another campaign in Pomerania, where he died in 1677. He served as a general in the army of Brandenburg.

== Marriage and issue ==
On 6 April 1644, Christian Albert married Countess Sophie Theodore of Brederode-Vianen (16 March 1620 in Vianen – 23 September 1678 in Halberstadt). Together, they had six sons, who were also army officers, and four daughters:

- Amalia (2 February 1644 – 11 March 1700), married in 1666 to Simon Henry, Count of Lippe (1639-1697)
- Frederick Henry (1645-1668), fell before Toulon
- Wolfard (1647 – 8 September 1686), Captain in the Brandenburg army; died in a duel in Magdeburg
- William Albert (d. 1673), Colonel in the Dutch army; fell before Maastricht
- Christopher (1651 – 27 October 1672 in Koblenz), Oberstwachtmeister in the Brandenburg army
- Charles Emil (10 September 1658 – 3 July 1686), colonel in the Brandenburg army; fell before Buda
- Dietrich Theodor (5 December 1659 – 17 July 1686), colonel in the Brandenburg army; fell before Buda
- Louise (1646 – 8 November 1687), married in 1670 to Count Louis of Solms-Hohensolms (1646 – 24 August 1707)
- Ursula Anna (12 August 1654 – 25 May 1678)
- Frederike Marie (28 December 1660 – 22 November 1729), married in 1690 to Christopher I, Burgrave and Count of Dohna-Schlodien (1665-1733), a son of her uncle Frederick
