= Bronki =

- Village
- Location within Poland
- Coordinates: 54°10′N 19°49′E
- Country: Poland
- Voivodeship: Warmian-Masurian
- County: Braniewo
- Gmina: Wilczęta

Bronki [ˈbrɔnki] is a village in the administrative district of Gmina Wilczęta, within Braniewo County, Warmian-Masurian Voivodeship, in northern Poland.
