= Jankówko, Warmian-Masurian Voivodeship =

Jankówko
- Village
- Location within Poland
- Coordinates: 54°7′52″N 19°52′39″E
- Country: Poland
- Voivodeship: Warmian-Masurian
- County: Braniewo
- Gmina: Wilczęta
- Population: 36

Jankówko [janˈkufkɔ] is a village in the administrative district of Gmina Wilczęta, within Braniewo County, Warmian-Masurian Voivodeship, in northern Poland.
