= Wilczęta =

- Village
- Location within Poland
- Coordinates: 54°10′7″N 19°52′57″E
- Country: Poland
- Voivodeship: Warmian-Masurian
- County: Braniewo
- Gmina: Wilczęta

Population
  - Total: 430
- Time zone: UTC+1 (CET)
  - Summer (DST): UTC+2 (CEST)
- Vehicle registration: NBR

Wilczęta [vilˈt͡ʂɛnta] is a village in Braniewo County, Warmian-Masurian Voivodeship, in northern Poland. It is the seat of the gmina (administrative district) called Gmina Wilczęta.

== Sports ==
The local football club is Piast Wilczęta. It competes in the lower leagues.
