= Góry, Braniewo County =

Góry
- Village
- Location within Poland
- Coordinates: 54°7′57″N 19°44′51″E
- Country: Poland
- Voivodeship: Warmian-Masurian
- County: Braniewo
- Gmina: Wilczęta
- Population: 183

Góry [ˈɡurɨ] is a village in the administrative district of Gmina Wilczęta, within Braniewo County, Warmian-Masurian Voivodeship, in northern Poland.
