= Tatarki, Warmian-Masurian Voivodeship =

Tatarki
- Village
- Location within Poland
- Coordinates: 54°7′55″N 19°54′33″E
- Country: Poland
- Voivodeship: Warmian-Masurian
- County: Braniewo
- Gmina: Wilczęta
- Population: 90

Tatarki [taˈtarki] is a village in the administrative district of Gmina Wilczęta, within Braniewo County, Warmian-Masurian Voivodeship, in northern Poland.
