= Górski Las =

- Settlement
- Location within Poland
- Coordinates: 54°7′16″N 19°44′43″E
- Country: Poland
- Voivodeship: Warmian-Masurian
- County: Braniewo
- Gmina: Wilczęta

Górski Las [ˈɡurski ˈlas] is a settlement in the administrative district of Gmina Wilczęta, within Braniewo County, Warmian-Masurian Voivodeship, in northern Poland.
