= Księżno, Braniewo County =

Księżno
- Village
- Location within Poland
- Coordinates: 54°12′N 19°51′E
- Country: Poland
- Voivodeship: Warmian-Masurian
- County: Braniewo
- Gmina: Wilczęta
- Population: 211

Księżno [ˈkɕɛ̃ʐnɔ] (German: Fürstenau) is a village in the administrative district of Gmina Wilczęta, within Braniewo County, Warmian-Masurian Voivodeship, in northern Poland.

== History ==
Księżno was founded in 1323. The charter was issued by the Elbląg Komtur (commander), Hermann von Oettingen. In 1330, permission was granted to establish an inn in the village. The new settlement was settled by German colonists, primarily from Thuringia. The charter was renewed in 1446 by the then Elbląg Komtur, Henryk von Plauen. After 1466, Księżno was pledged to the zu Dohna family of Gładysz. In 1539, Księżno was managed by a village headman, an innkeeper, and three peasants. In 1578, the village had the character of a noble village, encompassing an area of 60 łans.

On January 24, 1945, Red Army units entered the village. A hell of rape and pillage began. The Russians also shot all the forced laborers previously working in Księżno. During the fighting, numerous village buildings burned down or were destroyed. The Red Army finally captured Księżno on February 5. Of the 80 pre-war buildings, over 30 were destroyed. The villagers who died and were shot were buried opposite the school. None of the local women who were deported by the Soviets ever returned home. Mass deportations of the German population began in October 1945. A few remained in Księżno until 1947. After the war, the village was notable for its significant population of Ukrainian origin, forcibly resettled as part of Operation Vistula.
