= Siege of Hulst (1591) =

1591 siege

- Part of the Eighty Years' War & the Anglo–Spanish War & Maurice's campaign of 1591
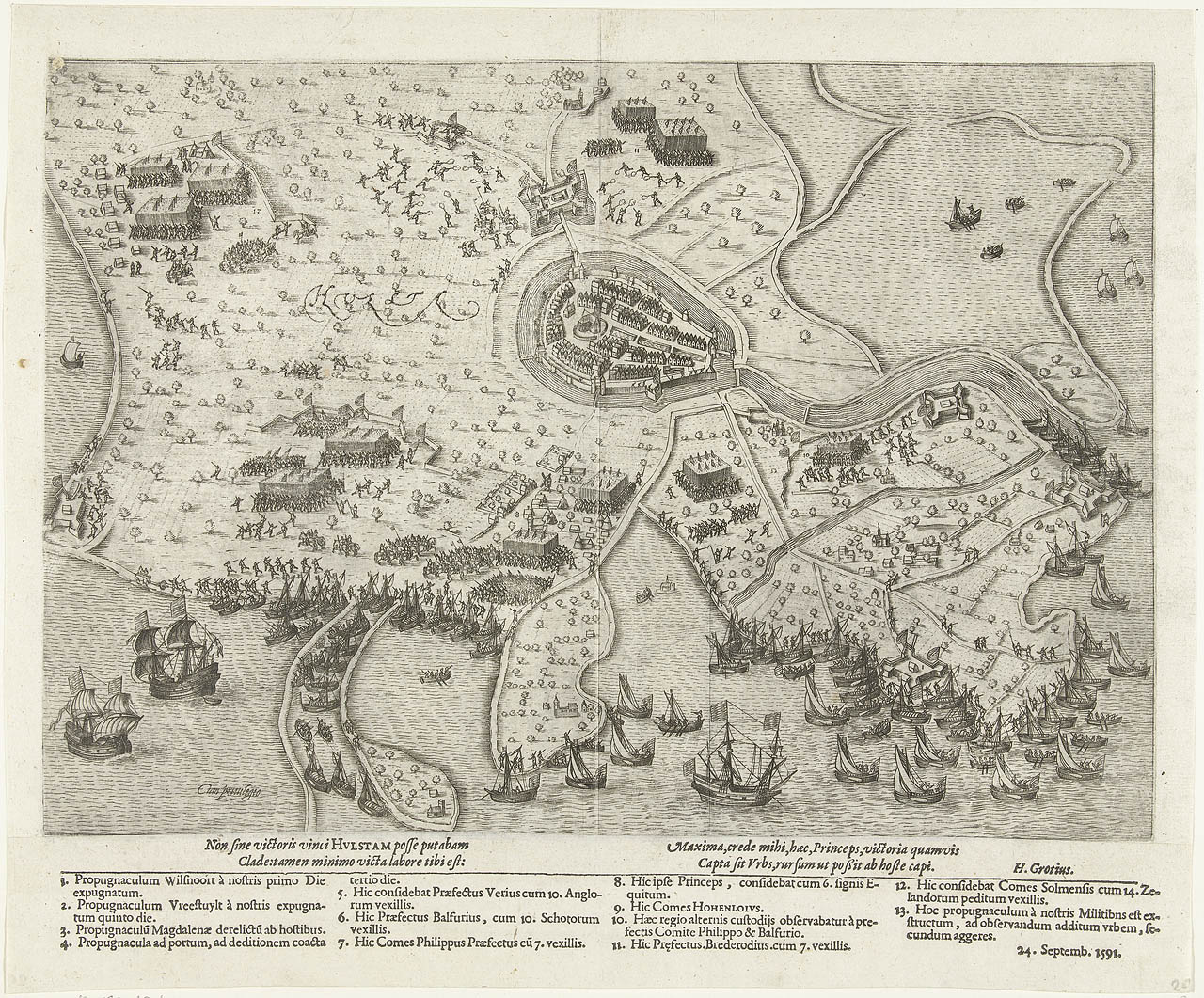
- The siege and capture of Hulst: print by Pieter Bast
Date	20–24 September 1591
Location	Hulst; Present day the Netherlands 51°18′57″N 4°03′14″E
Result	Dutch & English victory

Belligerents
Dutch Republic; England	(Spain) Spanish Empire

Commanders and leaders
(Dutch Republic) Maurice of Orange (England) Francis Vere	(Spain) Colonel Castillo

Strength
4,000 infantry 600 cavalry	400

Casualties and losses
Light	All captured
- Location within Zeeland Siege of Hulst (1591) (Netherlands)

The siege of Hulst was a siege of the city of Hulst that took place between 20 and 24 September 1591 by a Dutch and English army under the leadership of Maurice of Orange during the Eighty Years' War and the Anglo–Spanish War. The siege was part of Maurice's famous campaign of 1591.

== Background ==
In early 1591 Maurice with his army had launched a campaign against the cities of Zutphen, Deventer, and Delfzijl having forced the Spanish garrisons there to surrender. The army included sixteen English ensigns under Sir Francis Vere and ten Scots ensigns under Colonel Balfour. The combined army then faced the Spanish of the Duke of Parma at the fort of Knodsenburg just north of Nijmegen and defeated them during the siege there.

Afterwards Maurice gave the appearance he was going into winter quarters by late September 1591 Maurice however landed with his army at Kreverwille, and from there marched to Hulst. The ruse worked; nearly half of the Spanish garrison that normally would have been stationed there had been sent elsewhere, leaving only 400 troops in the city.

== Siege and aftermath ==
Maurice arrived at Hulst as planned on 19 September, and took advantage of the situation and went ahead with the siege. Maurice was hoping for a quick siege and therefore ordered a massive continual bombardment. The Spanish garrison commander Colonel Castillo was completely surprised by the Anglo-Dutch force that surrounded him and could offer only slight resistance. After five days of a continuous bombardment, Castillo and with no help from outside coming, asked for terms which was accepted. The Spanish garrison was given the honours of war and marched out with their arms.

Close by in Antwerp, which was honouring the Duke of Parma's son Ranuccio, the surrender of Hulst was totally unexpected and shocked the Spanish high command. Parma was angered and ordered that Castillo be immediately beheaded for his negligence.

Maurice put up defences around the region to consolidate his hold and then made secret plans to besiege Nijmegen rather than Geertruidenberg which was expected from the Spanish point of view to be the next target. After a weeks siege, Maurice captured Nijmegen and thus ended the victorious campaign for him in 1591.

After five years in Dutch hands, the city was retaken by Spanish forces under Archduke of Austria and remained in their hands until 1645 in one of the last sieges of the war.
