= Słobity-Stacja Kolejowa =

- Village
- Location within Poland
- Coordinates: 54°7′44″N 19°45′8″E
- Country: Poland
- Voivodeship: Warmian-Masurian
- County: Braniewo
- Gmina: Wilczęta
- Population: 118

Słobity-Stacja Kolejowa [swɔˈbitɨ ˈstat͡sja kɔlɛˈjɔva] is a village in the administrative district of Gmina Wilczęta, within Braniewo County, Warmian-Masurian Voivodeship, in northern Poland.

Its name means "Słobity Railway Station", the village being adjacent to the PKP (Polish State Railways) station serving the nearby village of Słobity.
