= Chmielówka, Braniewo County =

Chmielówka
- Settlement
- Location within Poland
- Coordinates: 54°12′33″N 19°54′42″E
- Country: Poland
- Voivodeship: Warmian-Masurian
- County: Braniewo
- Gmina: Wilczęta

Chmielówka ([xmjɛˈlufka]; German: Hopfenbruch) is a settlement in the administrative district of Gmina Wilczęta, within Braniewo County, Warmian-Masurian Voivodeship, in northern Poland.
