= Stare Siedlisko =

- Village
- Location within Poland
- Coordinates: 54°12′55″N 19°48′56″E
- Country: Poland
- Voivodeship: Warmian-Masurian
- County: Braniewo
- Gmina: Wilczęta
- Population: 251

Stare Siedlisko [ˈstarɛ ɕɛˈdliskɔ] is a village in the administrative district of Gmina Wilczęta, within Braniewo County, Warmian-Masurian Voivodeship, in northern Poland.
