= Ławki, Braniewo County =

Ławki
- Village
- Location within Poland
- Coordinates: 54°13′N 19°54′E
- Country: Poland
- Voivodeship: Warmian-Masurian
- County: Braniewo
- Gmina: Wilczęta
- Population: 217

Ławki [ˈwafki] is a village in the administrative district of Gmina Wilczęta, within Braniewo County, Warmian-Masurian Voivodeship, in northern Poland.
