= Karwiny =

- Village
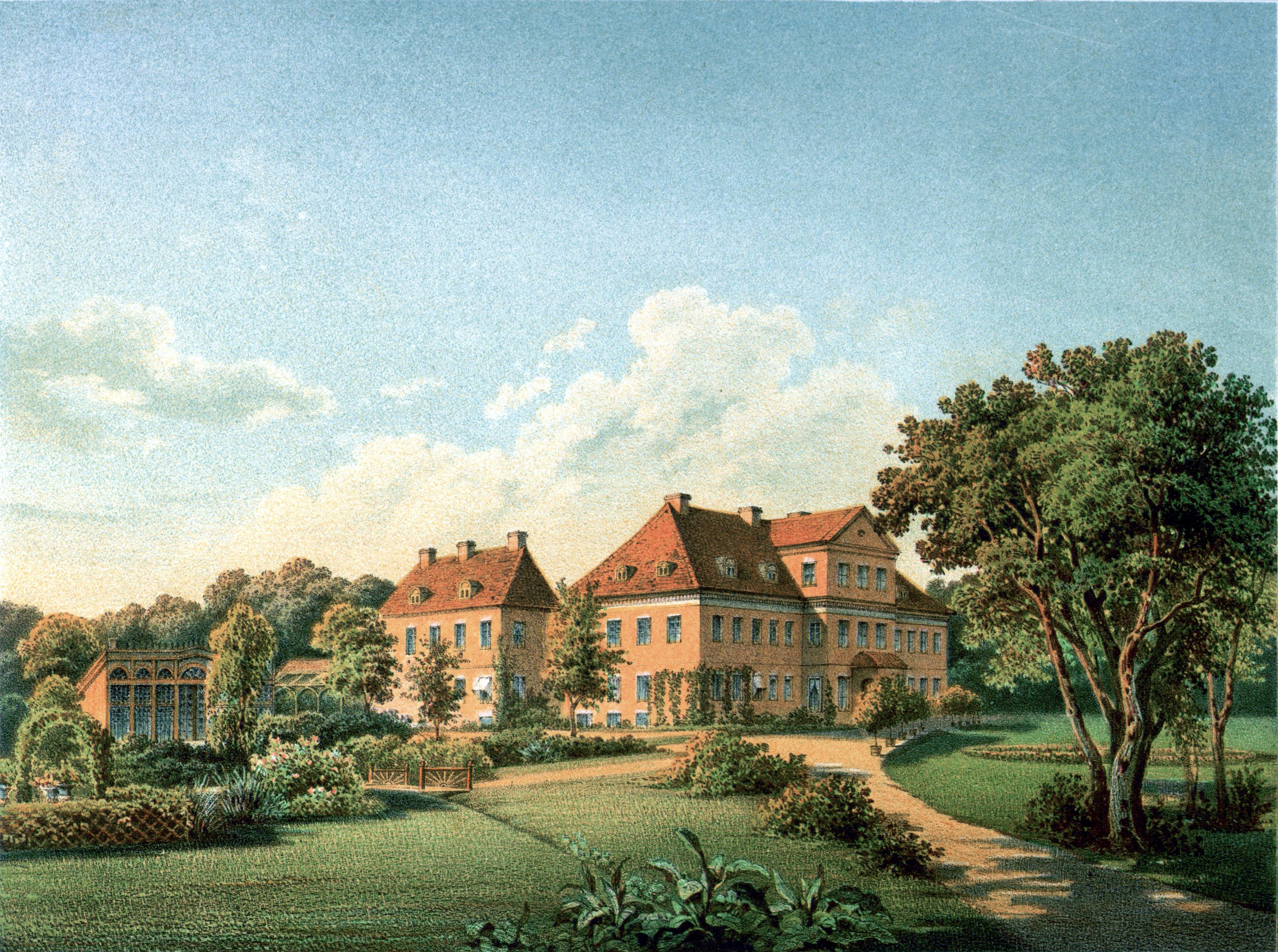
- Palace Carwinden around 1860, by Alexander Duncker

- Location within Poland
- Coordinates: 54°08′28″N 19°49′45″E
- Country: Poland
- Voivodeship: Warmian-Masurian
- County: Braniewo
- Gmina: Wilczęta
- Population: 125

Karwiny [karˈvinɨ] is a village in the administrative district of Gmina Wilczęta, within Braniewo County, Warmian-Masurian Voivodeship, in northern Poland.
