= Siege of Hulst (1645) =

Siege of the Eighty Years' War, 1645

- Part of the Eighty Years' War
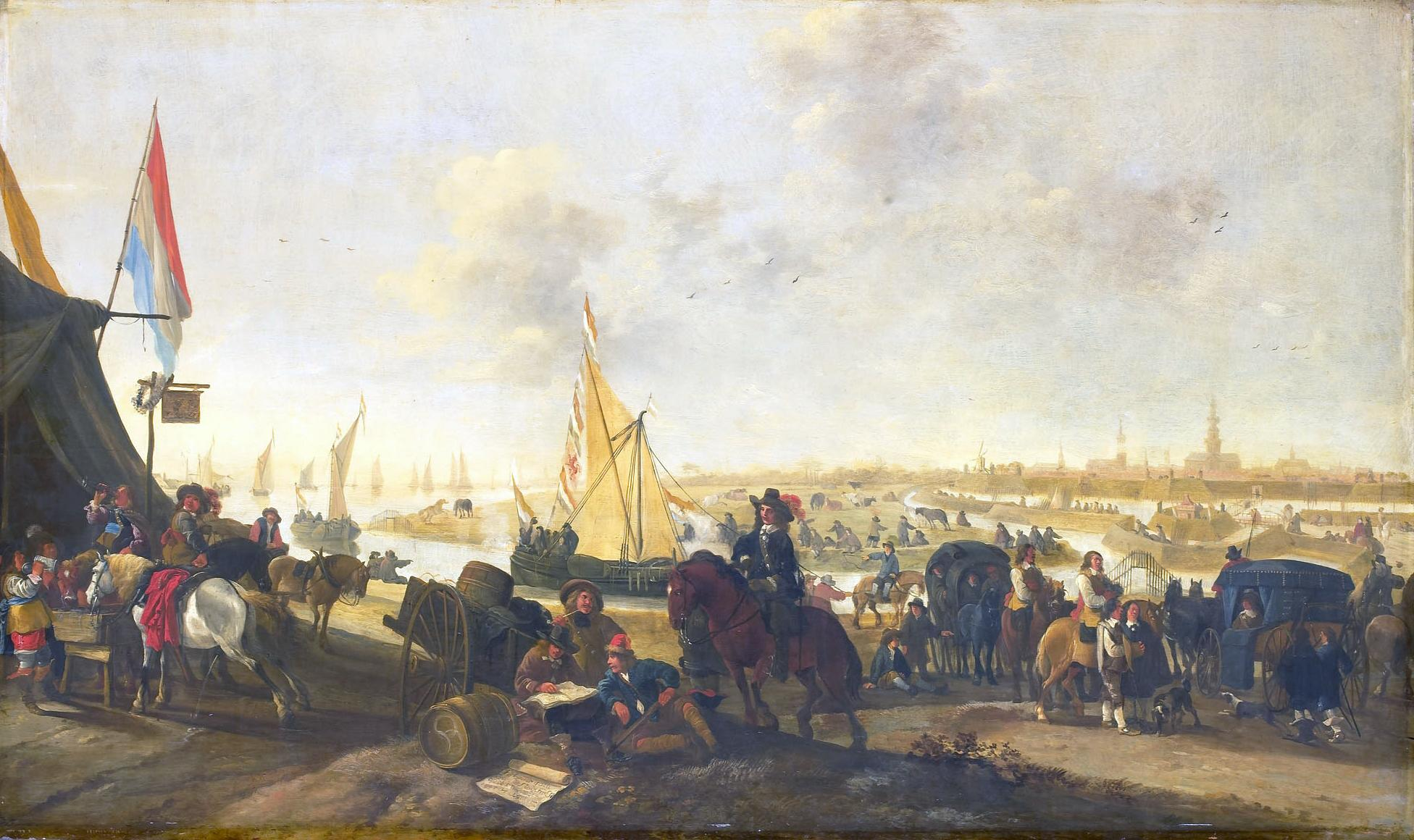
- The siege and capture of Hulst in 1645 by Hendrick de Meijer.
Date	7 October – 4 November 1645
Location	Hulst (present-day Netherlands)
Result	Dutch victory

Belligerents
Dutch Republic	Spain

Commanders and leaders
(Dutch Republic) Frederick Henry	(Spain) Jacques de Haynin du Cornet (surrendered)

Strength
12,500 infantry 2,500 cavalry 20 pieces of artillery	2,500 infantry 250 cavalry

Casualties and losses
1,600 dead or wounded	2,225 dead, wounded or captured

The siege of Hulst (1645) was the last major siege of the Eighty Years' War. Dutch troops commanded by Frederick Henry conquered the heavily fortified town of Hulst after only 28 days.

== Battle ==
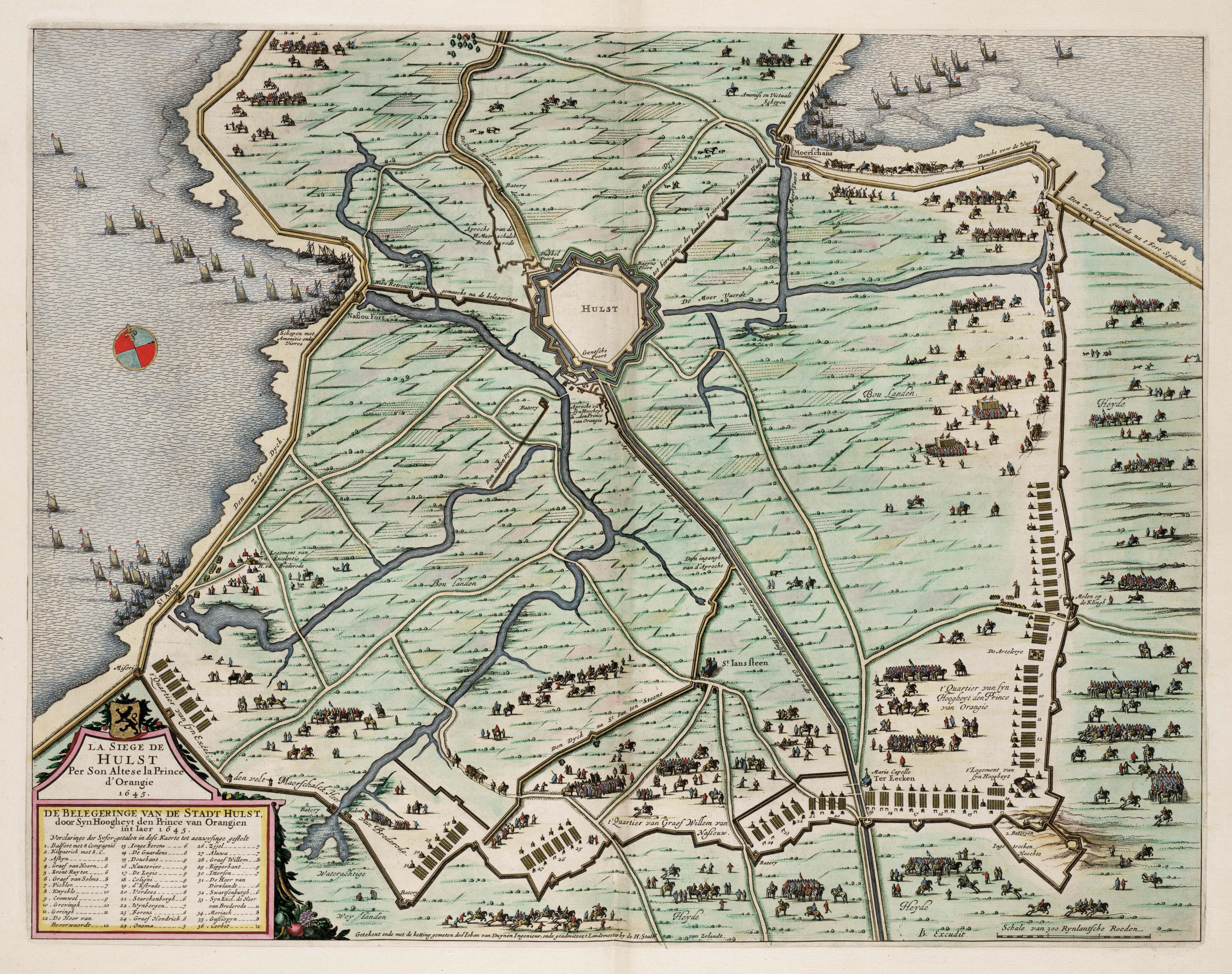
Map of the siege of Hulst

The battle was split in two stages. The Spanish were informed of the siege only two days before it started. The Dutch attacked with a force of 12,500 infantry, 2,500 cavalry and 20 pieces of artillery some 285 companies in total. This included 40 English (3,000 men) and 24 Scots (1,300) companies (despite their ongoing Civil war) commanded by Colonels Balfour, Craven, Herbert, Goring and Cromwell - a quarter of the total strength. The Spanish army compromised 2,500 infantrymen and 250 cavalry.

=== First stage ===
Frederick commanded 4,500 infantry and 5 pieces of artillery to attack the east side of the city. When the Dutch forces reached the Eastern side of the city, they met a small Spanish force of 1,500 men. The Dutch started with several cannon shots which killed already 100 men. The Spanish were quickly approached by the Dutch forces. In 10 days, the Spanish lost 1,000 men and the Dutch lost 400 men. The British regiments repeatedly assaulted and took various positions until the Dutch controlled the east side of the city.

=== Second stage ===
After Frederick heard about the success in the eastern Hulst he sent 1,000 cavalry reinforcements. He then attacked the center of the city. (The Spanish commander ordered the cavalry to rush toward Frederick himself. However, the cavalry was ambushed and nearly annihilated.) After 18 days of artillery fire, the Spanish commander finally surrendered.

== Aftermath ==
The Dutch captured Hulst with minimum losses: 1,500 infantry and 100 cavalry. The Spanish losses were 2,000 infantry and 225 cavalry.
