= Khanates of Azerbaijan =

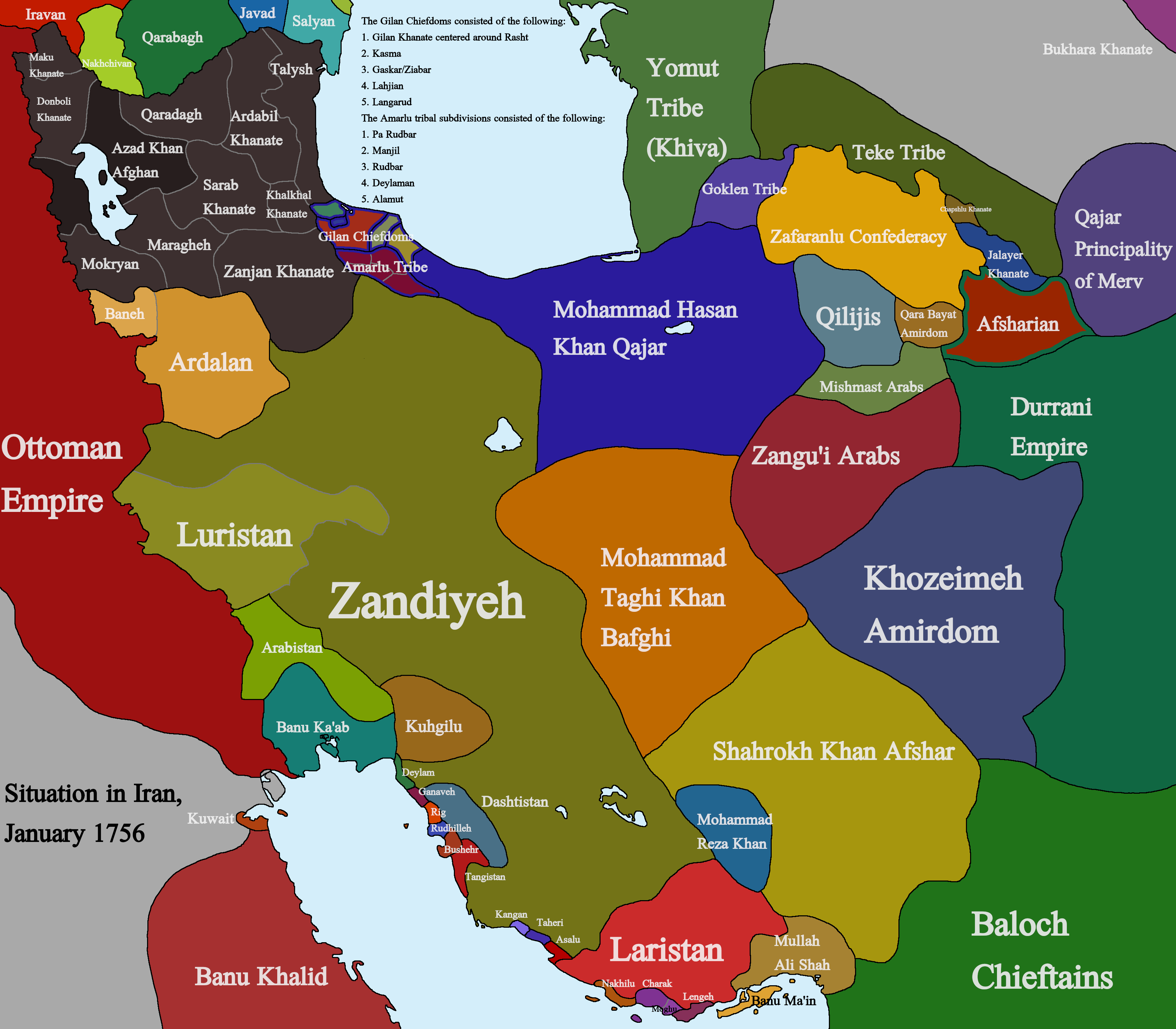
The khanates of Azerbaijan (in brown) within Iran in 1756

The khanates of Azerbaijan are a number of khanates which emerged in the historical Azerbaijan region in Iran following Nader Shah's death in 1747, at the same time as the neighboring khanates of the Caucasus. While the Caucasian khanates were lost to the Russian Empire following the Russo-Persian War of 1804–1813, the khanates of Azerbaijan remained under Qajar Iran’s authority. Some of these khanates were disestablished in the 19th century by the Qajars. Other khanates were allowed to remain by the Qajars into the 20th century, and were eventually disestablished by Reza Shah Pahlavi.

== List of the khanates of Azerbaijan ==
- Ardabil Khanate
- Karadagh Khanate
- Khalkhal Khanate
- Maku Khanate
- Maragha Khanate
- Marand Khanate
- Sarab Khanate
- Tabriz Khanate
- Urmia Khanate
