= Hasan Ali Khan Garadaghi =

Soviet-Azerbaijani writer (1848–1929)

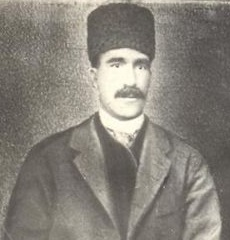
- Born: January 28, 1848; Shusha, Russian Empire
- Died: December 2, 1929 (aged 81); Shusha, Azerbaijan SSR
- Occupations: Philologist, Writer, Teacher, Poet

Hasan Ali Khan Garadaghi (Azerbaijani: Həsənəli xan Qaradaği) or Hasanali khan Karadakhski (Russian: Гасаналиага хан Карадагский), was an Azerbaijani philologist, writer, poet and teacher. He is mainly known for his contribution to "Vatan dili" (Mother Language) which was the main textbook for Azerbaijani school children for almost 40 years, from 1882 to 1920.

== Early life ==
Hailing from noble family, he was born posthumously to his father Hasan Ali Agha and his mother Khatun in Shusha, 1848. His paternal grandfather was Mahammadguli Khan, the last khan of Karadakh. His mother married for second time after his birth, therefore he was raised by his uncle, Mahammad Husayn. He studied and graduated from Shusha District school in 1866, continued his Arabic, Persian and Islamic studies with help from private tutors. Being influenced by Saadi, Ferdowsi, Nizami and Khaqani, he started to experiment with ghazals and mukhammas.

== Pedagogical activity ==
By 1860s, he started teaching privately in Shusha. Abandoning Islamic scholastic method, he introduced Russian methods of education with writing board and chalk in his one-room school, writing small didactic poems for his pupils. He started his full teaching activity in Azerbaijani language in 1878. In order to introduce his students Russian literature, he frequently translated from authors Alexander Izmaylov, Ivan Krylov and Lev Mojalevsky into Azerbaijani, being first to do so. One his students in this period, Zulfugar Hajibeyov would be one of the founders of the Azerbaijan Music Comedy Theater.

Hasan Ali Khan was invited to Tbilisi in 1881 by Alexei Chernyaevsky, head of Azerbaijani department of Transcaucasian Teachers Seminary, to work on Azerbaijani language textbook for children. He contributed to "Vatan dili" (Mother Language) textbook with 11 original and 23 translated (mainly from Ivan Krylov) poetry examples.

== Major works ==
- "Ancient and new features and essays of the Karabakh region, the narrative of the reigns of Panah Khan, Ibrahim Khan and Mehdiguli Khan". Written in 1880, it was a history book mainly dealing with Karabakh Khanate. However, this work was not preserved in its full form. In 1936, its excerpts were collected by his son Mahammad.
- "Tazkirayi Karadaghi". Collection of biographies and works by Karabakh ashuqs.
- "Book of Proverbs". Published in 1878, he collected over 250 Azerbaijani proverbs.

== Family ==
He belonged to Turcoman Ustajlu clan, a grandson of Mahammadguli Khan, the last khan of Karadakh. He firstly married to his own cousin, Balakhanum with no issue in 1891, then to Teyba Khanum in 1897 with whom he had 4 children, who all followed his footsteps to become teacher:

1. Mahammad Agha Garadaghi (1898–1976)
2. Chingiz Agha Karadakhli (1903–1969)
3. Boyuk Khanum Karadakhli (1913–1992)
4. Shafgat Agha Karadakhli (1916–1985)

== Later life and death ==
He was involved in Mir Mohsun Navvab's second literary society called “Majlis-i-Faramushan” (‘Society of the Forgotten'). Being a prolific poet, he wrote over 50 pieces with Qaradaği pen name. He attended to his uncle's funeral in Tbilisi, in 1888. Later marrying his daughter as well. He retired from public work in 1922 and had a stroke in 1924. After recover, he was tasked with collecting Karabakh poetry by Shusha Department of People's Education Commissariat of Azerbaijan. He died and buried on 2 December 1929 from an illness in Shusha.
