= Marand Khanate =

Marand Khanate خانات مرند مرند خانلیغی
- 1747–1828
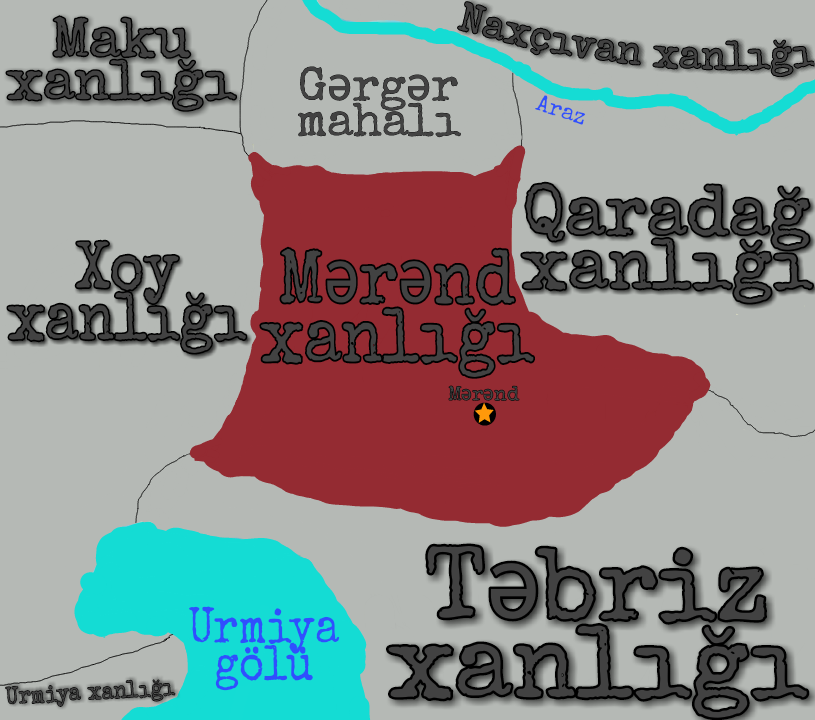
- Status: Khanate
- Capital: Marand
- Common languages: Persian (official), Azerbaijani (majority)
- Religion: Shia Islam
- History
  - Established: 1747
  - Independence from Afsharids: 1747
  - Disestablished: 1828
Preceded by	Succeeded by
Afsharid Iran	Qajar Iran
- Today part of: Iran

The Marand Khanate (Persian: خانات مرند) was an 18th–19th century khanate based in Marand. The khanate is known as one of the Khanates of Azerbaijan, located in historic Azerbaijan, which remained semi-independent for 81 years.

== The Khans of Marand ==
- Mohammadreza Khan Marandi
- Nazarali Khan Marandi ? - 1828
