= Karadagh Khanate =

- 1747–1828
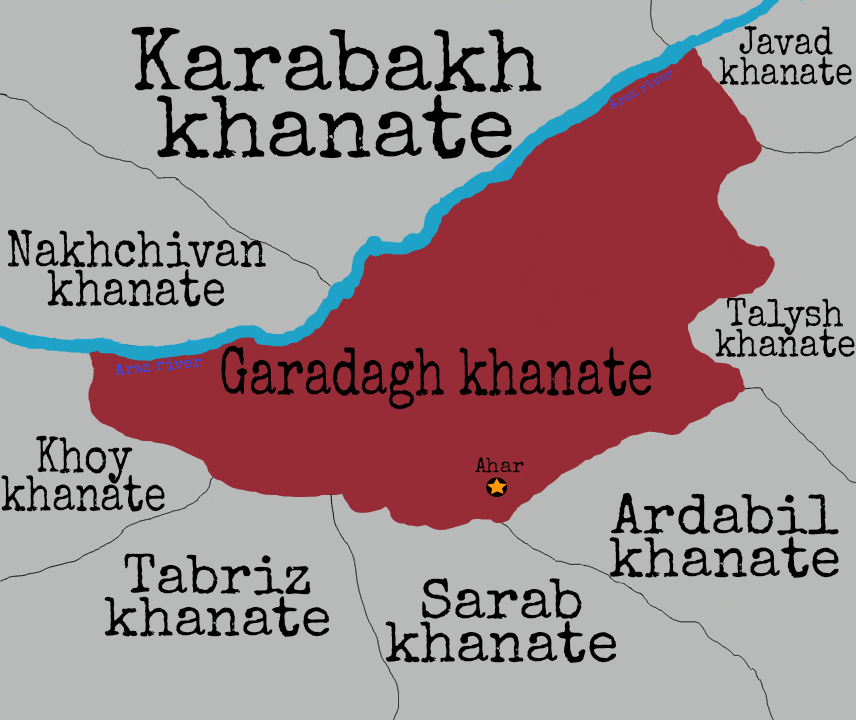
- Borders of the Khanate of Garadagh
- Status: Khanate
- Capital: Ahar
- Common languages: Persian (official), Azerbaijani (majority)
- Religion: Shia Islam
- History
  - Established: 1747
  - Independence from Afsharids: 1747
  - Disestablished: 1828
| Preceded by | Succeeded by |
| Afsharid Iran | Qajar Iran |
- Today part of: Iran

Karadagh Khanate (Persian: خانات قره‌داغ), was one of the Khanates of Azerbaijan established in the 18th century, with its capital at Ahar.

== Khanate ==
The khanate was founded in 1747 by Kazim Khan Karadakhli as an independent entity. Its territory had bordered by Talysh to east, Ardabil, and Tabriz to the south, Khoy to west, Nakhchivan, Karabakh and Javad khanates to north. Khanate's territory consisted mostly of Ungut, Karmaduz, Chalabiyan, Keyvan, Arazbar, Dizmar, Uzumdil, Hasanob, Kalaybar, Huseyneyli, Yaft, Garajurru, Dodanga, Chardanga, Dikla, Badbostan, and Horat mahals. The founder Kazim Khan pursued a prudent policy in regard to the neighboring feudal lords. He was more engaged in internal affairs and constructions, building several public buildings in khanate's capital Ahar. Khanate was under political dependence of Karabagh khanate for some period. In 1761 it was conquered by Karim Khan Zand and in 1791 by Agha Mohammad Khan Qajar. In 1808, the khanate was finally disestablished.

== Rulers ==
1. Kazim Khan Karadakhli — 1748–1752
2. Mustafakuli Khan — (1763–1782, 1786–1791)
3. Ismail Khan — (1782–1783, 1791–1797)
4. Najafkuli Khan — (1783–1786)
5. Abbaskuli Khan — (1797–1813)
6. Muhammadkuli Khan — (1813–1828)

== Ruling family ==
Khanate's ruling family belonged to Toqmaqlu subclan of the Ustajlu Turcomans. Enfeoffed by Tahmasp I as hereditary lords of Karadakh, they ranked 8th place in Kizilbash hierarchy. Their earliest known ancestor was Ilyas Khalifa who was born in Sivas.

- Ilyas Khalifa (c. 1500)
- Shamsaddin Khalifa (d. 1603)
- Ilyas Khalifa II (d. 1610)
- Burhanaddin Khalifa (c. 1611)
- Shamsaddin Khalifa II (no issues)
- Ahmad Khalifa
- Mahmud Sultan
- Bayandur Sultan (c. 1701)
- Muhammadqasim khan (d. 1721)
- Abdurrazzaq khan (khan, later in 1725, Pasha of Ottoman Empire; d. 1729)
- Kazim khan (r. 1730–1763)
- Mustafakuli khan (r. 1763–1782, 1786–1791)
- Ismail khan (r. 1782–1783, 1791–1797)
- Abbaskuli khan (r. 1797–1813)
- Muhammadkuli khan — (r. 1813–1828; d. 1840)
- Hasanliagha khan (b. 1820, d. 1847)
- Hasanali khan Karadakhski (1848–1929)
- Mahammadhuseyn khan (b. 1827, d. 1891)
- Sadatquli khan
- Najafkuli khan (r. 1783–1786; d. 1818)
