= Khalkhal Khanate =

Khalkhal Khanate خانات خالخال
- 1747–1809
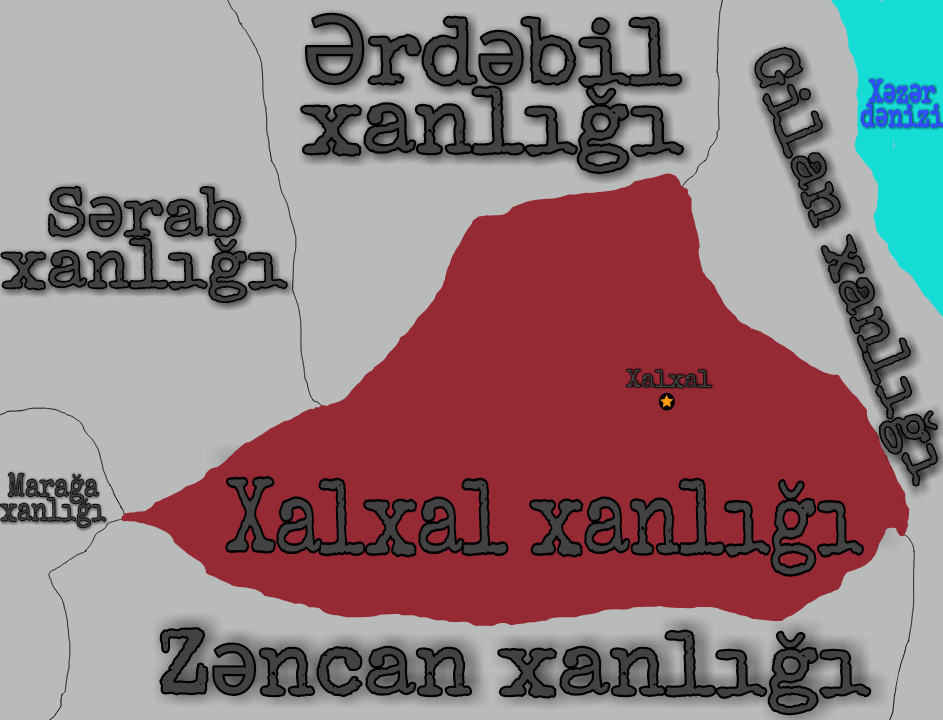
- Status: Khanate
- Capital: Khalkhal
- Common languages: Persian (official), Azerbaijani (majority)
- Religion: Shia Islam
- History
  - Established: 1747
  - Independence from Afsharids: 1747
  - Disestablished: 1809
Preceded by	Succeeded by
Afsharid Iran	Qajar Iran

The Khalkhal Khanate (Persian: خانات خالخال) was an 18th–19th century khanate based in Khalkhal. Khanate of Khalkhal was one of the khanates of Azerbaijan (in Iran) which remained semi-independent for 62 years.

== Founding ==
The khanate was founded by Qizilbash tribes, especially Amirli clan of Afshars, following the assassination of Nader Shah in 1747. Founder of the khanate was Amir-Guna Khan (1747–1782), a former governor of Gilan. He formed an alliance with Fath-Ali Khan Afshar against Karim Khan Zand, later betraying him to the latter. After Karim Khan's death he forged alliance with Gilan against Nazarali Khan Shahsevan. He was succeeded by his son Farajulla Khan (1782–1786). His younger son Muhammad Hussein Khan, retained power until the establishment of the Qajar state in the region, when Agha Muhammad Shah Qajar (1796–1797) was proclaimed shah. His reign lasted until 1799, when it was absorbed by the Qajar rulers of Iran.

== Administration ==
Khalkhal khanate was ruled by nobles entitled khans, but after Qajar takeover their rulers title demoted to hakims. The khanate was divided into Khalkhal, Ţārom, Huna (modern Aqkand, Kaghazkonan District) and Hir mahals.
