= Alexei Chernyaevsky =

Azerbaijani educator of Russian origin (1840–1894)

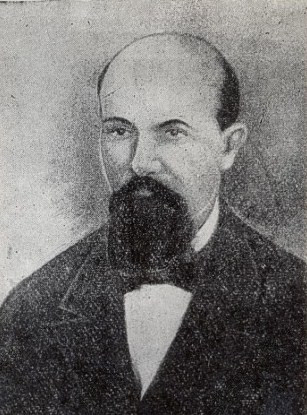
- Born: 1840; Shamakhi,Russian Empire
- Died: 1894-12-14; Tbilisi,Russian Empire
- Occupation: teacher

Alexei Osipovich Chernyaevsky (Russian: Алексей Осипович Черняевский; 1840, Shamakhi – December 14, 1894, Tiflis) was an educator, methodologist, and pedagogue. His textbook "Vatan dili" (The Native Language) is the first Azerbaijani language textbook published for Azerbaijanis based on the syllabic method.

== Life ==
Aleksey's parents were among the first Molokans who were resettled to Azerbaijan in 1834–1835. They were settled in the Altiaghach area of the Shamakhi district. Between 1834 and 1839, their total number reached 1,681 people.

As new settlers arrived, those who had been settled earlier were either distributed among villages or relocated to other areas with dense Molokan populations. Villages such as Khilmili, Astrakhanka, Maryevka, Jabani, Chukhuryurd, and Mareze were Molokan villages located in the Shemakha uezd. Very few Molokans risked leaving their community to live in a Muslim environment. The newly married Chernyaevsky couple was among those few. A.O. Chernyaevsky’s parents were from the Saratov region. In 1840, the couple moved to the village of Mareze, where their son Alexei was born that same year. Alexei received his primary education at the Shamakhi uezd school. After studying for several years, he had to leave school due to financial difficulties.

Chernyaevski, through his own efforts, learned Azerbaijani Turkish perfectly, and later, on February 1, 1857, he began working as a postman at the post office in the city of Aghsu. During this time, he had a strong interest in teaching. While working as a postman, children from nearby villages would gather around him, and he would interact with them and teach them the Russian language.

== Activity in the field of education ==
In the 1860s, at the initiative of the Governor of Baku, Kolyubakin, several public schools were opened in Russian villages, including the first public school in the village of Mareze in 1866. Chernyaevsky began teaching at the newly opened school without any compensation. In 1867, the trustee of the Caucasus Educational District, Neverov, visited the village of Mareze to observe the school’s operations firsthand. He was highly impressed by the teaching process and provided a detailed report on the school’s activities to the Governor-General of the Caucasus. The report stated:

"The Governor of Baku — Lieutenant General M.P. Kolyubakin — assigned the management of the school in the village of Mareze, in the absence of teachers, to the station master Chernyaevski, who lived in that village. Chernyaevsky, a young man of 23 or 24 years old, had studied at the Shamakhi uezd school and had begun teaching at the school without pay... The station master managed things so well that just over a year after the school opened, I found it in a condition incomparably better than the state primary schools under our jurisdiction."

In March 1867, there were 81 students at the school. In terms of student numbers, this school was even able to rival the district schools. The main reason for the recognition of the Mareze school was its democratic principles. Education there was free, which allowed children of peasants to attend. In fact, unlike state schools, only peasant children studied there. The principle of gender segregation, strictly enforced in state schools, was not applied here. Alongside about 60 male students, girls were also educated at the Mareze school. Subjects taught included Russian language, mathematics, geography, and natural sciences. The disciplinary methods used in state and madrasa schools were not practiced in the Mareze school.

One of the most notable aspects of the Mareze school was its emphasis on visual instruction. This was a progressive pedagogical principle not only for that time but even by today’s standards. Through this approach, Chernyaevsky opposed the mechanical teaching methods commonly used by many teachers in state schools. The trustee noted that Chernyaevsky "stood against rote learning based on dead mechanical methods, where students simply memorized expressions they did not understand, and instead emphasized visual instruction and explanatory reading. In short, Chernyaevsky possessed a natural pedagogical intuition."

An interesting conversation took place between Y.M. Neverov and A.O. Chernyaevski. The trustee said that he would apply to the authorities to have Chernyaevsky rewarded. However, Chernyaevsky objected, expressing concern that the children’s parents might lose their trust in him if they heard he was being rewarded. Since Chernyaevski knew Azerbaijani Turkish very well, Neverov promised to appoint him as an Azerbaijani Turkish teacher in Tiflis.

The young teacher's interest in pedagogical knowledge was so strong that despite limited funds as a station master, he ordered and read books and textbooks for himself. Additionally, he wrote an article titled "About Public Schools in Transcaucasia", which was published in the Kavkaz newspaper. In 1867, with the help of the students' parents, Aleksey Osipovich managed to build a new school building and also opened a library there. Both children and adults used this library.

Learning about Chernyaevsky’s influence on the children and his activities at the school, the leadership of the educational institutions of Transcaucasia offered him the vacant position of preparatory class teacher at the newly opened Shamakhi district school in 1867. From that year, Chernyaevsky began fulfilling his duties in this role. A document from the Caucasus educational district notes that in May 1868, the governor visited the Mareze village school and presented a silver cup with gold inlay to the former teacher Chernyaevsky and a silver watch to the current teacher.

In 1869, at the age of 29, Chernyaevsky began working in Georgia at a closed boarding school, first as a teacher and later as an inspector. In 1870, he was appointed director of the Nikolayev primary school in Tbilisi. In 1871, he was appointed deputy head of the public schools department in Baku. Later, this position was transferred to Kuban. After working in this role for eight years, in 1879, an Azerbaijani department was established under the ZMS in the city of Gori, and the seminary director D.D. Semyonov invited A.O. Chernyaevsky to serve as the department inspector. He fulfilled the inspector role until 1893, the year of his death. Chernyaevsky frequently visited Azerbaijan and recruited young, talented Azerbaijanis to study at the seminary. He trained many educators at the seminary, who later took upon themselves the work of public enlightenment in Azerbaijan’s cities and villages.

== The Vətən dili textbook ==
Chernyaevsky began his work writing a textbook in Azerbaijani Turkish for the first time during these years. Although an Azerbaijani department was opened within the Gori Teachers' Seminary, it was not possible to open a primary school there. At Chernyaevsky’s initiative, twenty peasant children from all over the Caucasus were gathered and admitted to the boarding school established under the seminary. However, since there was no primer written in Azerbaijani Turkish at that time, it was very difficult to teach Azerbaijani Turkish to the gathered children.

Chernyaevsky urgently gathered the experienced Azerbaijani students of the school and discussed this issue with them. Since there was no textbook yet, with the help of these students, he prepared reading books for weekly programs and practical lessons in daily classes. Rashid bey Afandiyev, who was a student at the Gori Teachers' Seminary at that time, later wrote about this:

"At one point, they realized that there had never been a primer in the Turkic (Azerbaijani) language. Thus, Chernyaevsky gathered the senior students in his office and formed a commission. I was also one of those who joined this commission. We prepared weekly programs and materials for daily lessons. Four primary schools were teaching using the phonetic method. There were books printed with this method in Armenian, Georgian, and Russian languages. However, there was a great need to publish a new book specifically for the Turkic (Azerbaijani) language. Because young teachers who graduated from the Tatar (Azerbaijani) department were opening Turkic schools in the villages. When they went to the villages, they would model their schools after the exemplary school in the seminary and teach their lessons with newly written books. For this reason, Chernyaevsky developed the teaching materials he had and prepared a textbook, which was printed in 1883 under the title Vətən Dili (The Native Language’) using my handwriting for the lithographic printing."

Chernyaevsky collected extensive materials to write the textbook titled Vətən dili and studied these materials to use them as a foundation for preparing the textbook in the future. He quickly mastered the Arabic alphabet and gained sufficient experience by teaching students for more than three years. Later, using the texts he had utilized, he prepared the primer Vətən dili based on the phonetic teaching method. The initiative to teach and write textbooks using the phonetic method among Turkic peoples originated specifically from Azerbaijan. This method was first applied in Azerbaijani schools in 1880 to improve the quality of education and simplify the learning process.

Speaking about the significance of writing the Vətən dili textbook, Chernyaevsky later wrote the following:

Much was needed to establish new primary schools modeled after the primary school operating alongside the Azerbaijani department of the seminary. One of these necessities was textbooks prepared with a new method. No matter how hard I searched, I could not find a book that conformed to the laws of teaching and education. Although I reviewed the existing books, I did not consider them suitable for pedagogical methodology and found them unfit for use in our school. I saw teaching with old methods and using the currently available books as ineffective. If we had continued with those books, we would not have been able to present our school as systematic and modern. Thus, due to these difficulties, I decided it was necessary to teach the Muslim [Arabic] alphabet using the phonetic method.

Vətən dili was written in the Arabic script by Chernyaevsky's student, Rashid bey Afandiyev. Due to Rashid bey's beautiful handwriting, Chernyaevsky had him transcribe the book, which was then published in Tiflis in 1882. Vətən dili is the first textbook written in the Azerbaijani language using the phonetic (sounding-out) method. The textbook consisted of 48 pages and, with minor changes, was reprinted starting from 1910, serving for many years as a primary tool for Azerbaijani children to learn literacy in schools. To facilitate the use of this textbook, a separate teaching manual for educators — titled "Üsul kitabı" (Method Book) — was also prepared.

After the first book, A.O. Chernyaevsky and Safarali bey Velibeyov jointly published the second part of Vətən Dili in 1888 at the Kashkul printing house in Tbilisi. This book was intended for second-grade students and consisted of 150 pages as a reading textbook.

On the cover of the book, the phrase was written:

"A book for instruction, reading, composition, and dictation exercises in the Turkish-Azerbaijani language."

The book provided detailed explanations of grammar, orthography, and methodological issues, offering valuable suggestions for teachers. For the first time, it addressed certain orthographic rules and the use of punctuation marks.

The second part of Vətən Dili aimed to:

- Improve children's reading skills,
- Teach writing rules and spelling knowledge,
- Enrich their vocabulary.

The included texts — such as poems, proverbs, and riddles — carried both educational and moral value.

== Memory ==
The name of Aleksey Osipovich Chernyaevsky has been given to a school in the city of Gobustan, located in the Gobustan district (since 1990, Gobustan has been recognized as a district). A bust of him has been erected in front of the school. In the Narimanov district of Baku, a street has also been named after Aleksey Osipovich Chernyaevsky.

Chernyaevsky's character is reflected in Ismayil Shykhly's novel "Dəli Kür" ("Mad Kura"). In the film adaptation of this novel, the role of Chernyaevsky was portrayed by Vladislav Kovalikov.

In 1895, a newspaper article about Alexei Osipovich Chernyaevsky was published in the Novoye Obozreniye newspaper in Tbilisi, signed by the renowned literary critic and researcher Firidun bey Kocharli. In the article, kind words were expressed about the late educator Aleksey Osipovich Chernyaevski, who had once taught the author at the Gori Teachers’ Seminary. His teaching dignity and pedagogical talent were highly praised. The author wrote:

"The late Chernyaevsky... was an excellent pedagogue, and he spoke the Azerbaijani language—used by common people and children—very well. No one else used Azerbaijani folk sayings as aptly and naturally in conversation as he did."

Rashid bey Afandiyev, a student of Chernyaevsky, also wrote in his article titled "Who is Chernyaevsky?" that he was deeply shaken by the death of A. Chernyaevsky—the head of the Azerbaijani department of the Gori Teachers’ Seminary, an educational devotee who authored and published the first European-style national textbook for Azerbaijani children, and who dedicated his entire conscious life, talent, and skills to the development of national education. During his 40-year pedagogical career, Chernyaevsky educated more than 250 Azerbaijani intellectuals. Afandiyev highly praised the efforts of his teacher and friend, emphasizing that Alexei Osipovich was one of those rare individuals who could serve as a role model both in the field of education and in personal life. At the end of the article, the author repeated the question “Who is Chernyaevsky?” and answered it himself: "Chernyaevsky was a highly moral, well-mannered man, born in Shamakhi into a poor Russian family, who mastered the Azerbaijani language like a native Azerbaijani son."

== Literature ==
- Əhmədov, Hüseyn (2001). Azərbaycan Məktəb və Pedaqoji Fikir Tarixi (in Azerbaijani). Bakı: Təhsil nəşriyyatı.
- Əhmədov, Hüseyn (2016). А.О. ЧЕРНЯЕВСКИЙ — ПОДВИЖНИК образования Азербайджана (in Russian).
- Əhmədov, Hüseyn (1985). XIX əsr Azərbaycan Məktəbi (in Azerbaijani). Bakı: Maarif yayımları.
- Məmmədova, Almaz (2010). Azərbaycan dilinin tədris tarixi (in Azerbaijani). Bakı: Kitab aləmi.
- Cəlilova, Vəfa (2012). SOVYET DÖNEMİ VE BAĞIMSIZLIK SONRASI AZERBAYCAN'DAKİ LİSELERDE DİL VE EDEBİYAT ÖĞRETİMİ (in Turkish). Ankara: GAZİ ÜNİVERSİTESİ EĞİTİM BİLİMLERİ ENSTİTÜSÜ ORTAÖĞRETİM SOSYAL ALANLAR EĞİTİMİ ANA BİLİM DALI TÜRK DİLİ VE EDEBİYATI EĞİTİMİ BİLİM DALI.

== Additional literature ==
- Çernyayevski, A.O. (1899). Vətən dili, I hissə. Tiflis. p. 70.
- Çernyayevski, A.O. (1901). Vətən dili, I hissə. Tiflis. p. 70.
- Çernyayevski, A.O. (1899). Vətən dili, I hissə. Tiflis. p. 70.
- Çernyayevski, A.O. (1888). Vətən dili, II hissə. Tiflis. p. 192.
- Çernyayevski, A.O. (1888). Vətən dili, II hissə. Tiflis. p. 192.
- Agaev, A. A. (1989). Антология педагогической мысли Азербайджанской ССР. Москва: Изд-во «Педагогика». p. 592 с.: ил.
- Mehdizadə, Z. M. (1983). Жизнь и педагогическая деятельность А. О. Черняевского: К 140-летию со дня рождения. Баку: Изд-во «Маариф». p. 87.
- Çernyayevski, A. O. (1894). Книжка для учителей, преподающих по учебнику «Русская речь». Дидактические и методические указания, необходимые для успешного преподавания русского языка в инородческих училищах. Тифлис: Типография скоропечатня М. Мартиросианца и Ко. p. 101 с.
- Çernyayevski, A. O. (1986). Русская речь. Элементарный учебник русского языка для татарских (азербайджанских) школ Закавказского края и Книжка для учителей, преподающих по учебнику «Русская речь». Баку: Изд-во «Маариф». p. 203 с.
- Çernyayevski, A. O. (1895). Русская речь. Элементарный учебник русского языка для начальных училищ, в которые поступают дети, не знающие русского языка. Тифлис: Типография скоропечатня М. Мартиросианца и Ко. p. 146 с.
