= Khanate =

Monarchical state ruled by a khan

A khanate (/ˈxɑːneɪt, -ət/ KHAHN-ayt, -ət) or khaganate was a polity ruled by a khan, khagan, khatun, or khanum. Khanates were typically nomadic Mongolic and Turkic societies located on the Eurasian Steppe, and politically equivalent in status to kinship-based chiefdoms and feudal monarchies. Khanates and khaganates were organised tribally, where leaders gained power on the support and loyalty of their warrior subjects, gaining tribute from subordinates as realm funding. In comparison to a khanate, a khaganate, the realm of a khagan, was a large nomadic state maintaining subjugation over numerous smaller khanates. The title of khagan, translating as "Khan of the Khans", roughly corresponds in status to that of an emperor.

== Mongol khanates ==
The successor states of the Mongol Empire in 1335: the Ilkhanate, Golden Horde, Yuan dynasty and Chagatai Khanate

- Mongol Empire (1206–1368) was the largest steppe nomadic Khaganate as well as second largest empire and the largest contiguous empire in history. After Genghis Khan established appanages for his family in the Mongol Empire during his rule (1206–1227), his sons, daughters, and grandsons inherited separate sections of the empire. The Mongolian khanates that emerged from those appanages are listed below.
  - Chagatai Khanate (1226–1347), established by Chagatai Khan, the second son of Genghis Khan. At its height in the late 13th century, the khanate extended from the Amu Darya south of the Aral Sea to the Altai Mountains in the border of modern-day Mongolia and China, roughly corresponding to the defunct Qara Khitai Empire. Initially the rulers of the Chagatai Khanate recognized the supremacy of the Great Khan, but by the reign of Kublai Khan, Ghiyas-ud-din Baraq no longer obeyed the emperor's orders. By 1347 the khanate had split into the Moghulistan and West Chagatai Khanate.
    - Moghul Khanate
      - Yarkent Khanate
      - Turpan Khanate
      - Kumul Khanate
  - Ilkhanate (1256–1335), established by the grandson of Genghis Khan, Hulagu Khan. Its core territory lies in what is now part of the countries of Iran, Azerbaijan, and Turkey. At its greatest extent, the Ilkhanate also included parts of modern Iraq, Syria, Armenia, Georgia, Afghanistan, Turkmenistan, Pakistan, part of modern Dagestan, and part of modern Tajikistan. Later Ilkhanate rulers, beginning with Ghazan in 1295, converted to Islam. In the 1330s, the Ilkhanate was ravaged by the Black Death. Its last khan Abu Sa'id died in 1335, after which the khanate disintegrated. The Ilkhanid rulers, although of non-Iranian origin, tried to advertise their authority by tying themselves to the Iranian past, and they recruited historians in order to present the Mongols as heirs to the Sasanians (224–651 AD) of pre-Islamic Iran.
    Turco-Mongol residual states and domains in the 15th century
  - Golden Horde
    - Blue Horde
      - Great Horde
      - Astrakhan Khanate
      - Crimean Khanate
      - Khanate of Kazan
    - White Horde
      - Nogai Horde
      - Kazakh Khanate
      - Khanate of Bukhara
      - Khanate of Khiva
      - Khanate of Sibir
  - Yuan dynasty
    - Northern Yuan dynasty
      Central Asia in 1636. The Dzungar Khanate was the last great nomadic empire in Central Asia
      - Qamil or Kara Del
      - Altan Khan of the Khotogoid
      - Tüsheet Khan
      - Sechen Khan
      - Zasagt Khan
- Oirat Khanate
  - Dzungar Khanate (1634–1758), formed by the Dzungars, a confederation of several Oirat tribes. It covered Xinjiang region of China, Kyrgyzstan, eastern Kazakhstan and western Mongolia. 1717–1720, also styled Protector of Tibet; annexed by the Qing dynasty.
  - Kalmyk Khanate (1630–1771), established by the Torghut branch of the Mongol Oirats, settled along the lower Volga River (in modern Russia and Kazakhstan).
  - Khoshut Khanate (1642–1717), established by the Khoshut branch of the Mongol Oirats.
- Bogd Khanate (1911–1924), under the rule of the Bogd Khan, the last Mongol khagan.
- Keraite Khanate
- Khamag Mongol Khanate
- Kumul Khanate (1696–1930), a vassal state to Qing dynasty and Republic of China.
- Merkit Khanate
- Naiman Khanate
- Tatar Khanate

== Turkic khanates ==
=== Early and Late Medieval Turkic khaganates and khanates ===
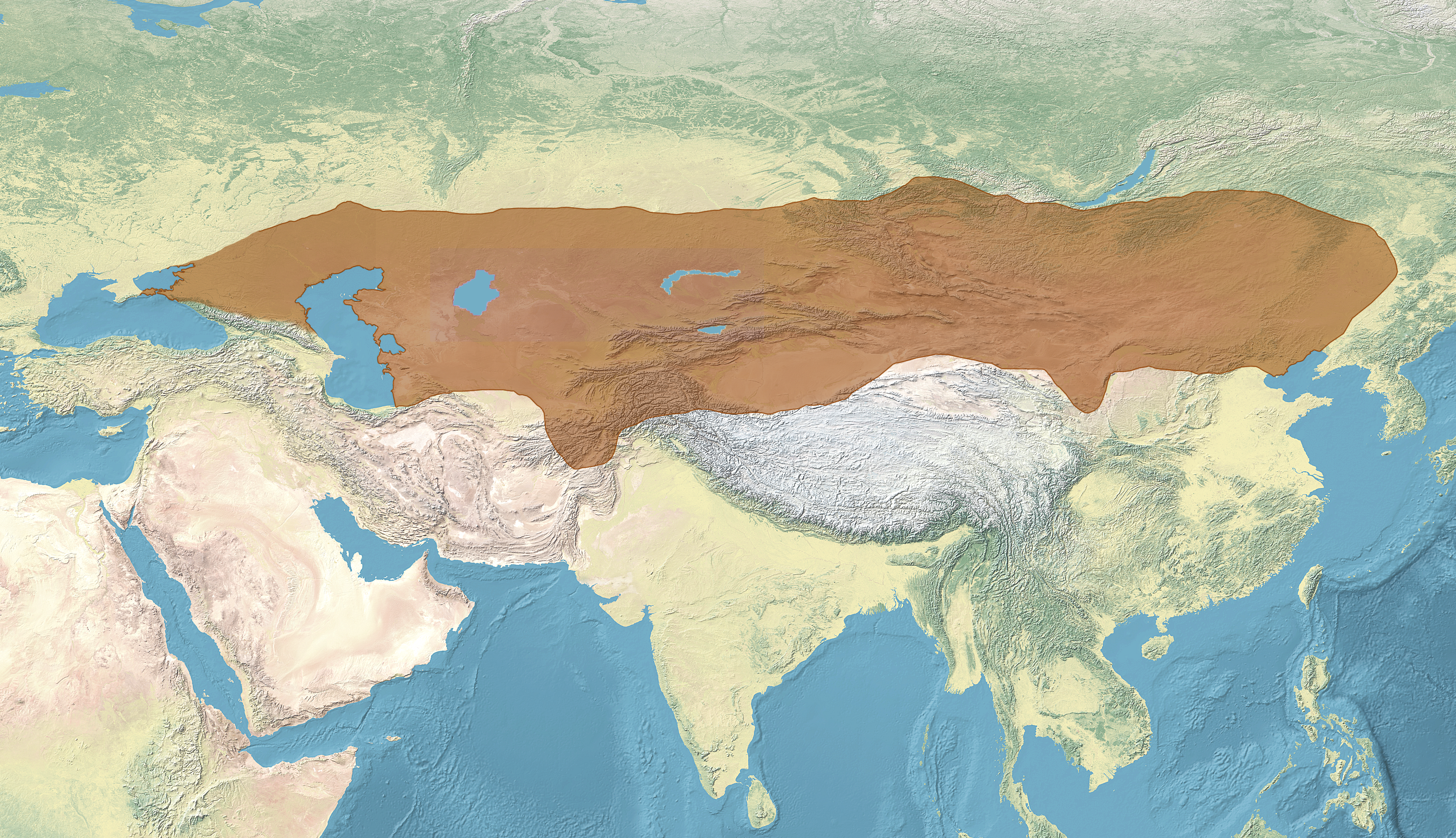
First Turkic Khaganate in 576 CE

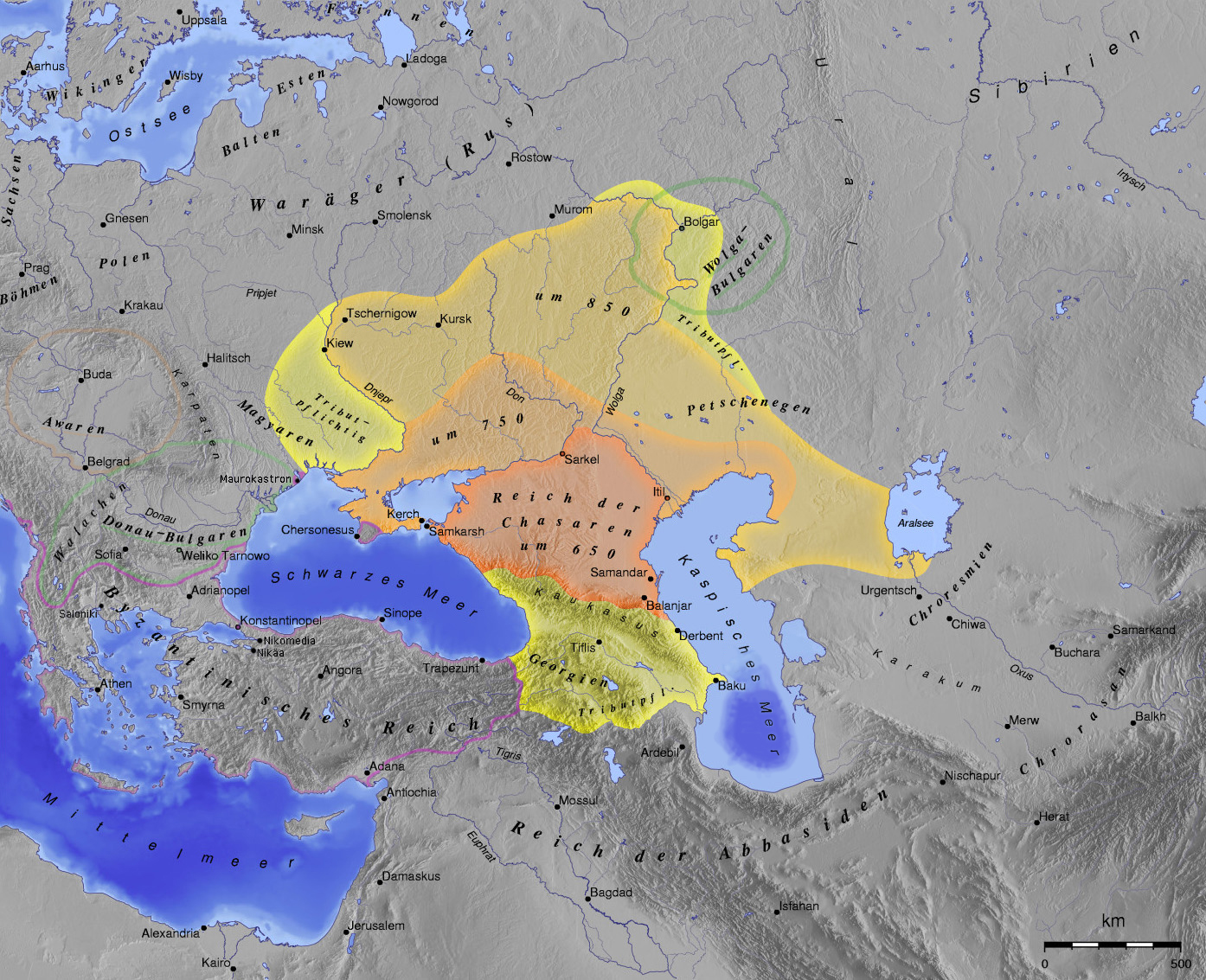
Khazar Khaganate, 650–850 CE

- First Turkic Khaganate
  - Eastern Turkic Khaganate
  - Western Turkic Khaganate
- Second Turkic Khaganate
- Uyghur Khaganate
- Yenisei Kyrgyz Khaganate
- Khazar Khaganate – Turkic nomads who later converted to Rabbinic Judaism
- Turgesh Khaganate

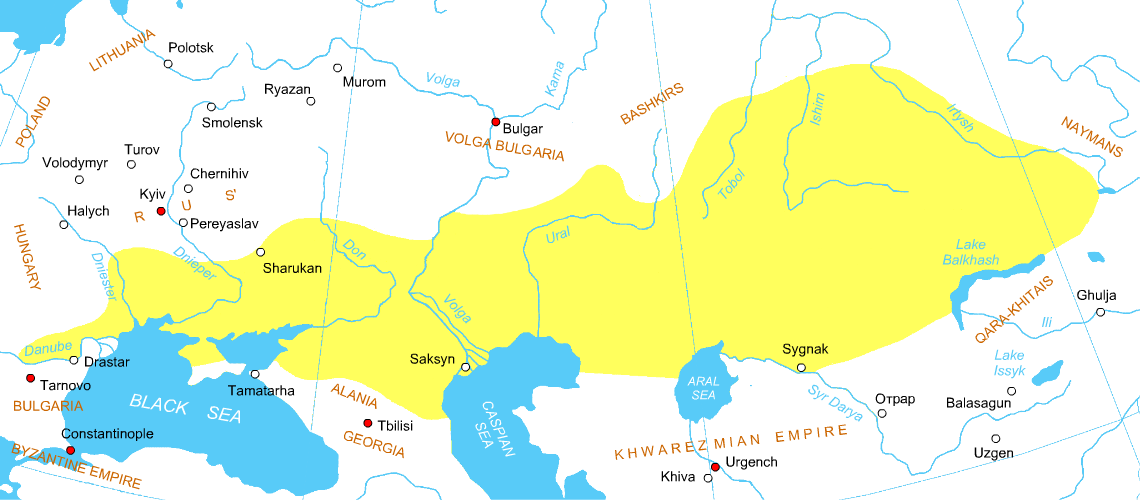
Cumania, c. 1200 CE

- Cumania
- Pechenegs

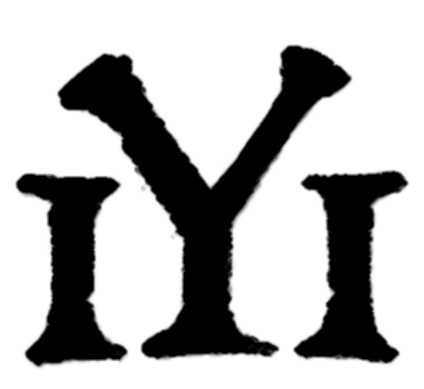
Tamgha of the Bulgar Turkic Dulo clan which ruled the First Bulgarian Empire

- Old Great Bulgaria
- Volga Bulgaria
- First Bulgarian Empire, which started as a Turkic state, also known as Danube Bulgaria (in contrast to Volga Bulgaria, as both were established by members of the same Bulgar Turkic Dulo clan), but later became fully Slavicized and a Tsardom.
- Golden Horde
- Khanate of Kazan
- Crimean Khanate

=== Central Asian Turkic khanates ===
- Kara-Khanid Khanate
- Kimek Khanate
- Keraite Khanate
- Naiman Khanate
- Tatar Khanate
- Merkit Khanate
- Nogai Khanate
- Astrakhan Khanate
- Besh Tau El
- Khanate of Bukhara
- Khanate of Khiva
- Kyrgyz Khaganate
- Kara-Kyrgyz Khanate
- Karluk Khanate
- Khanate of Kashgaria – Kashgaria was founded in 1514 as part of Chagatai Khanate; in the 17th century it was divided into several minor khanates without importance, with real power going to the so-called Khwaja, Arabic Islamic religious leaders. It became the Yarkent Khanate which was annexed by the Dzungar Khanate in the Dzungar conquest of Altishahr in 1680.
- Kazakh Khanate
  - Senior zhuz
  - Middle zhuz
  - Junior zhuz
  - Bukey Horde, Bokei or Buqei; also known as the Inner or Interior Horde – This state founded in 1801 by Sultan Bukey under Russian suzerainty, and restyled as the khanate of the Inner Horde in 1812. 5,000–7,500 families of Kazakhs from the Younger Kazakh Zhuz tribe settled between the Volga and Yaik (Ural) rivers. In 1845 the post of khan was abolished, and Russia took over the region.
- Kokand Khanate
- Kumul Khanate – a vassal state to Qing dynasty and Republic of China, abolished in 1930
- Kunduz Khanate
- Maimana Khanate
- Oghuz Yabgu State
- Qasim Khanate (hence modern Kasimov) – named after its founder, a vassal of Moscow and Russia
- Khanate of Sibir – source of the name Siberia, as the first significant conquest during Russia's great eastern expansion across the Urals
- The Khanate of Tuva near Outer Mongolia
- Uzbek Khanate
- Yarkent Khanate
- Turpan Khanate

== Khanates of Azerbaijan ==
- Ardabil Khanate
- Karadagh khanate
- Khalkhal Khanate
- Maku Khanate
- Maragheh Khanate
- Sarab Khanate
- Tabriz Khanate
- Urmia Khanate

== Khanates of the Caucasus ==
- Khundzakh Khanate
- Baku Khanate
- Derbent Khanate
- Erivan Khanate
- Ganja Khanate
- Gazikumukh Khanate
- Javad Khanate
- Karabakh Khanate
- Khoy Khanate
- Kura Khanate
- Marand Khanate
- Mehtuli Khanate
- Nakhchivan Khanate
- Quba Khanate
- Shaki Khanate
- Shamakhy Khanate
- Shirvan Khanate
- Talysh Khanate

== Other khanates ==
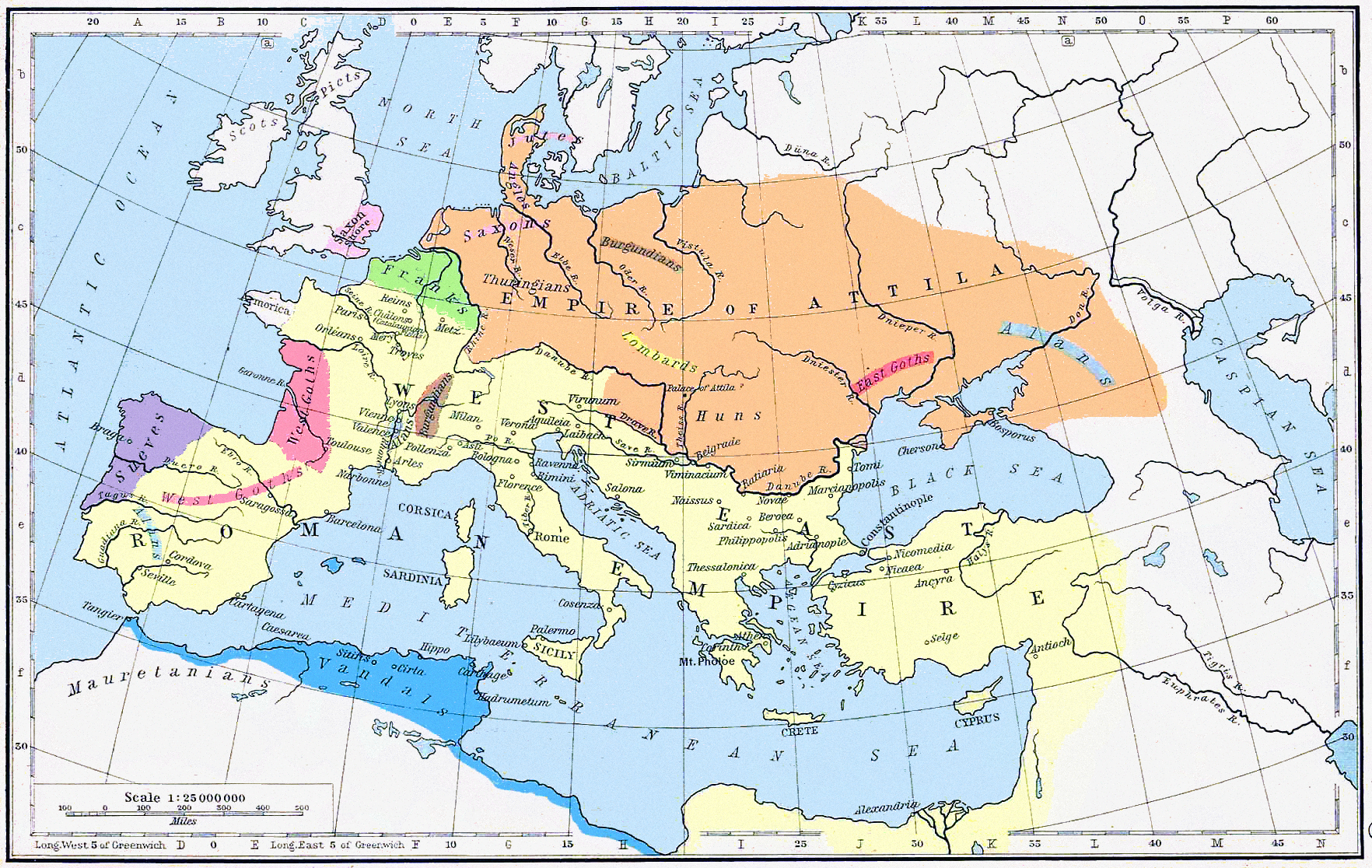
Hunnic Empire of Attila in c. 450 CE

- Avar Khaganate
- Khanate of Kalat – Brahui/Baloch Khanate
- Later Jin dynasty – Later evolved into the Qing dynasty
- Nishapur Khanate
- Rouran Khaganate
- Xiongnu, mentioned in Chinese sources, were possibly of Proto-Turkic, Turkic, Mongolic or else Iranic origin (disputed) and are proposed as the possible ancestors of the Huns (whose language remains unclassified).
  - Xueyantuo, mentioned in Chinese sources, were a Tiele tribe, related to the earlier Dingling people, who emerged after the disintegration of the Xiongnu confederacy (they were at one point vassals of the Göktürks, later aligning with the Tang dynasty against the Eastern Göktürks).

== See also ==
- Rus Khaganate (not an actual Khanate but so named retroactively)
- Afsharid dynasty
- Beg Khan
- Orda (organization)
- Safavid dynasty
- Timurid dynasty
