= Stille (river) =

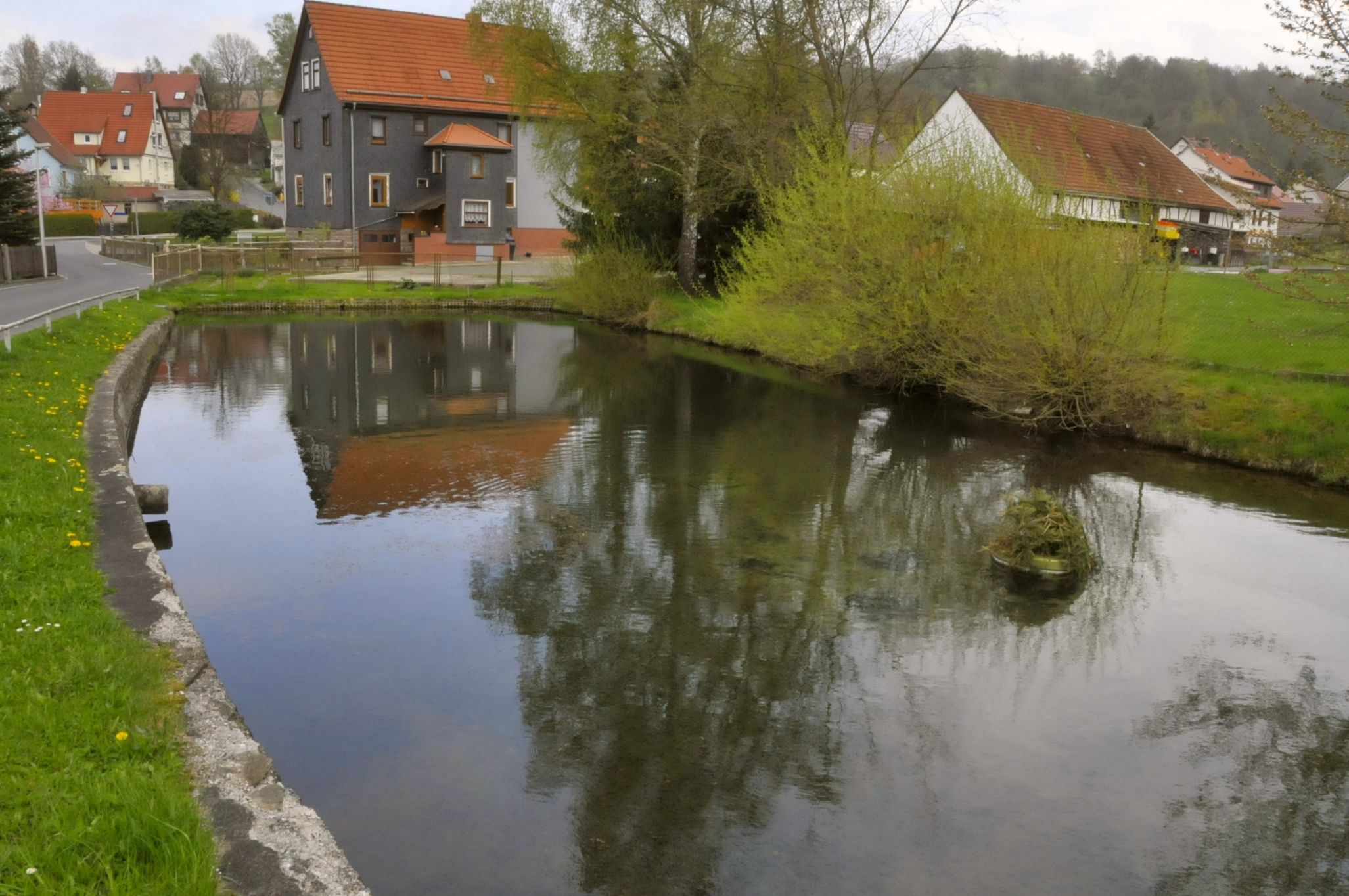

Location
- Country: Germany
- State: Thuringia

Physical characteristics
- Mouth
  - location: Schmalkalde
  - coordinates: 50.7220°N 10.4451°E

Basin features
- Progression: Schmalkalde→ Werra→ Weser→ North Sea

Stille is a river in Schmalkalden-Meiningen, Thuringia, Germany. It flows into the river Schmalkalde in the town Schmalkalden. The river is 11.5 km long and originates in a pond near Springstille. The Stille flows from Springstille through the villages of Neumühle, Mittelstille, and Näherstille before flowing into the Schmalkalde in Schmalkallden.

== See also ==
- List of rivers of Thuringia
