= Kleinschmalkalden =

- village
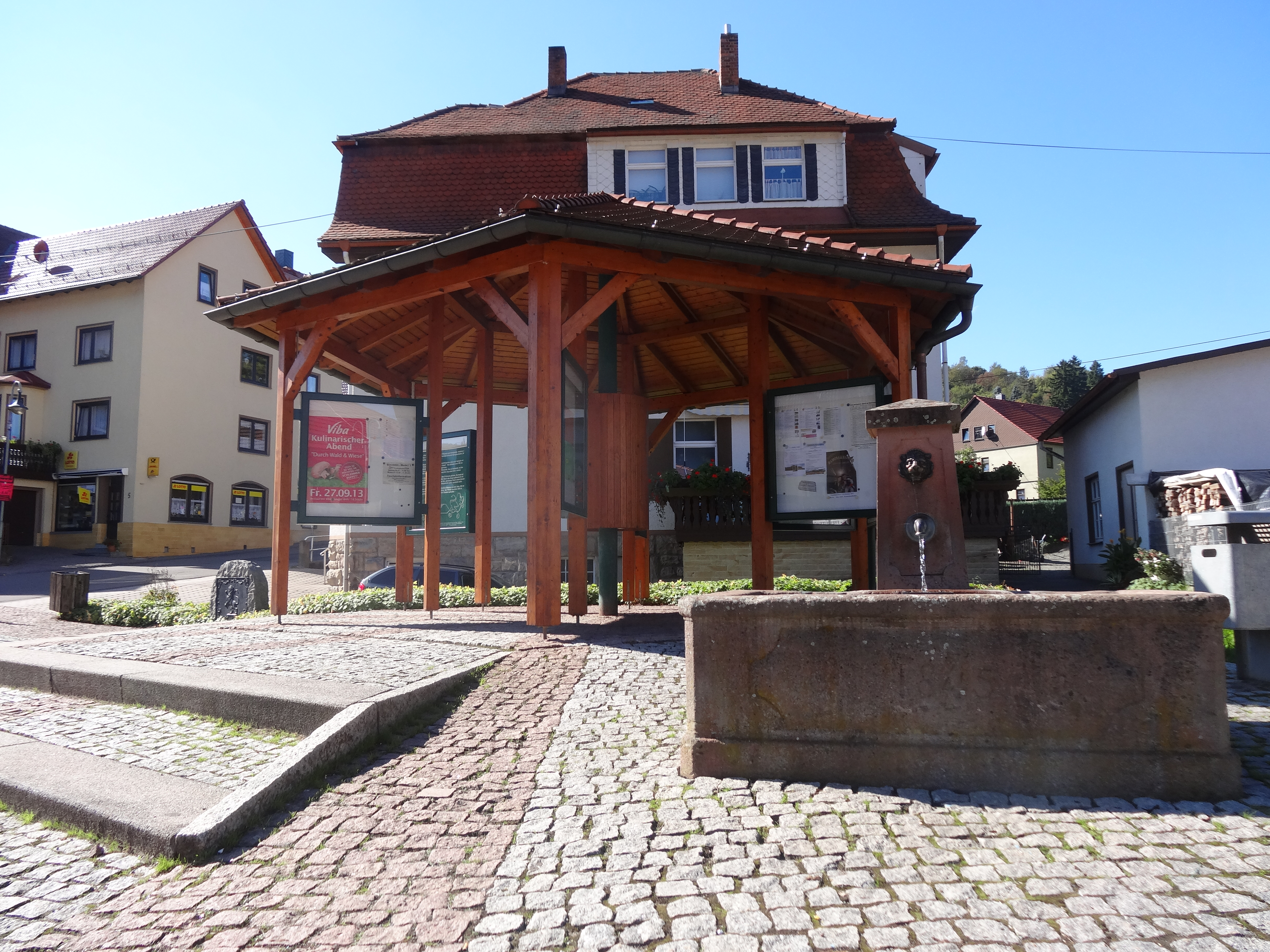
- Village square and well

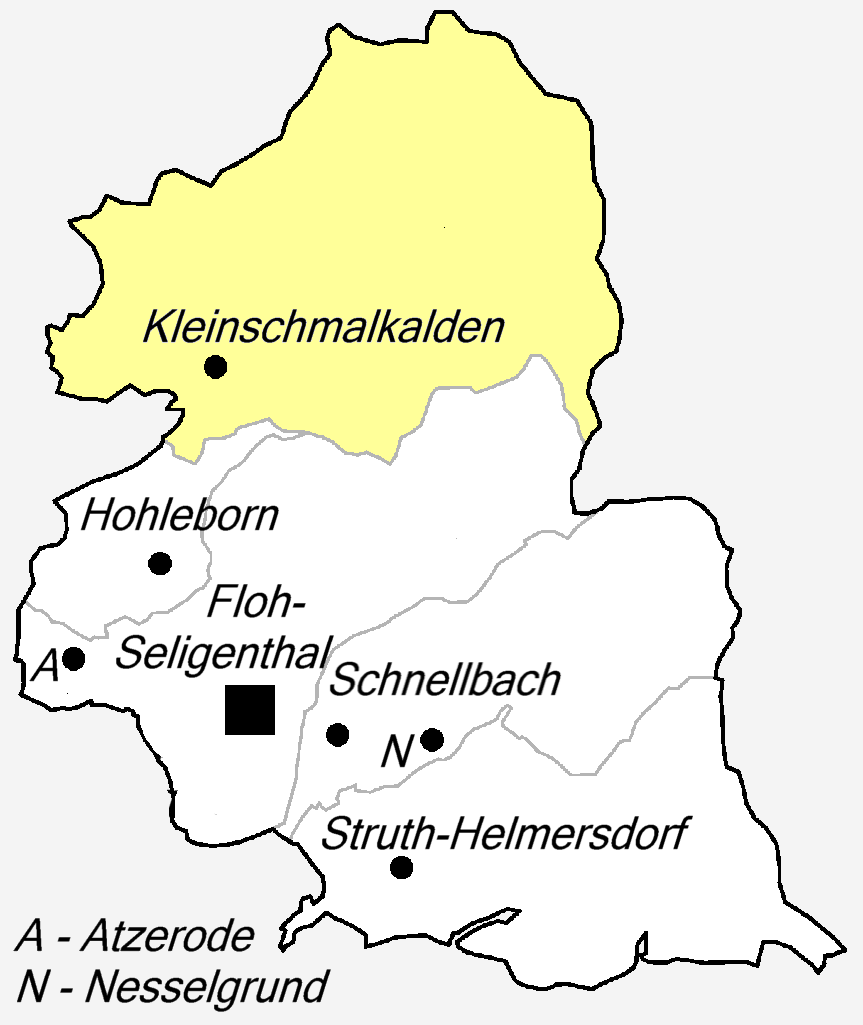
- Kleinschmalkalden in Floh-Seligenthal

- Kleinschmalkalden in Thuringia
- Coordinates: 50°47′N 10°28′E
- Country: Germany
- Federal state: Thuringia
- District: Schmalkalden-Meiningen
- Municipality: Floh-Seligenthal
- first recorded: 1378
- merged: 1 February 2006
- Elevation: 500 m (1,600 ft)

Population (2006)
  - Total: approx. 1,500
- Time zone: UTC1 (CET)
  - Summer (DST): UTC2 (CEST)
- Post code: 98593
- Area code: 036849
- Website: www.kleinschmalkalden.de (unofficial)

Kleinschmalkalden is a village on the southern slope of the Thuringian Forest in Landkreis Schmalkalden-Meiningen of Thuringia, Germany. In 2006 it joined the neighbouring municipality Floh-Seligenthal.

== Geography ==
The village is situated high in the valley of Schmalkalde river which passes through the centre of the village. For several hundred years, until the end of the Second World War, the river also formed a political boundary creating two distinct villages separated by only a few metres of water. Population, as of 2006, is about 1500 persons. The Rennsteig passes about 5 km (3.1 mi) north of the village.

Kleinschmalkalden is located on road L 1026 between Schmalkalden and Friedrichroda, road L 1127 towards Ruhla via Brotterode branches off in the centre of the village. The former railway line between Schmalkalden and Brotterode is now a cycle path.

== History ==
A smithy on the site of the village was first mentioned in 1378. The part west of Schmalkalde river was recorded in 1465 as a village. It belonged to Amt Brotterode in the lordship of Schmalkalden which was an exclave of the Landgraviate of Hesse-Kassel. In 1866 this village came to Prussia. Another settlement formed east of the river after 1500. It was part of Amt Tenneberg in the duchy of Saxe-Gotha and came to the Free State of Thuringia in 1920. The partition of the village is the reason why there are two evangelical churches, the Hessian and the Gothaic church.

A railway line from Schmalkalden was opened on 6 November 1892. It was extended to Brotterode on 19 December 1898. Kleinschmalkalden station became a double terminus. Passenger traffic from Kleinschmalkalden to Brotterode ceased in 1964. Most of this branch was lifted in 1970, but rebuilt in 1984 for freight traffic. Passenger traffic between Schmalkalden and Kleinschmalkalden ceased on 30 November 1996, the complete line was lifted in 2002.

The two villages were administratively merged on 1 October 1945, and the combined centre was renamed Pappenheim after Ludwig Pappenheim (1887–1934), a social democrat, politician, and founder of the Schmalkalden newspaper Volksstimme, who was killed in KZ Neusustrum. On 27 July 1990 the name of the village was reverted to Kleinschmalkalden. In 1994 it entered an administrative cooperation with the neighbouring town Brotterode, before joining the municipality Floh-Seligenthal in 2006.

== Sights ==
The village is the home of the world's largest cow bell manufactured by the local firm Venter Glocken. The cowbell is 3.28 m (10.8 ft) and weighs 920 kg (2,030 lb).

The older Hessian church was built in 1719, replacing a wooden church of 1570. The Gothaic church was built in 1854. Until then, the inhabitants of the smaller and poorer Gothaic part of the village had to attend the church in the Hessian part, and had to contribute to its maintenance which they could hardly afford.

== Economy ==
Mining was the principal occupation in Kleinschmalkalden until the 17th century, accompanied by ironmaking and charcoal burning. After its decline, the manufacture of metal ware, bellows, and baskets in particular developed. Later, basket making gave way to cigar-making and leather processing. Due to the steep slopes of the surrounding countryside, agriculture played only a minor role. Currently, cow bells, tools, and other metal goods are made in Kleinschmalkalden, and staghorn is processed. A business park has not been established.

The village was a recognised Luftkurort and carried the designation Kurort until its merger with Floh-Seligenthal. The joint municipality is also recognised as a recreation locality.

== Education ==
A schoolhouse was built for the Gothaic part of the village in 1661. Later, the village possessed a Volksschule and a vocational school. A Polytechnic Secondary School existed during the times of the GDR. Nowadays, children from Kleinschmalkalden attend school in Floh.

== Notable people ==
- Ernst Hoeltzer
- Martin Weber

== Gallery ==
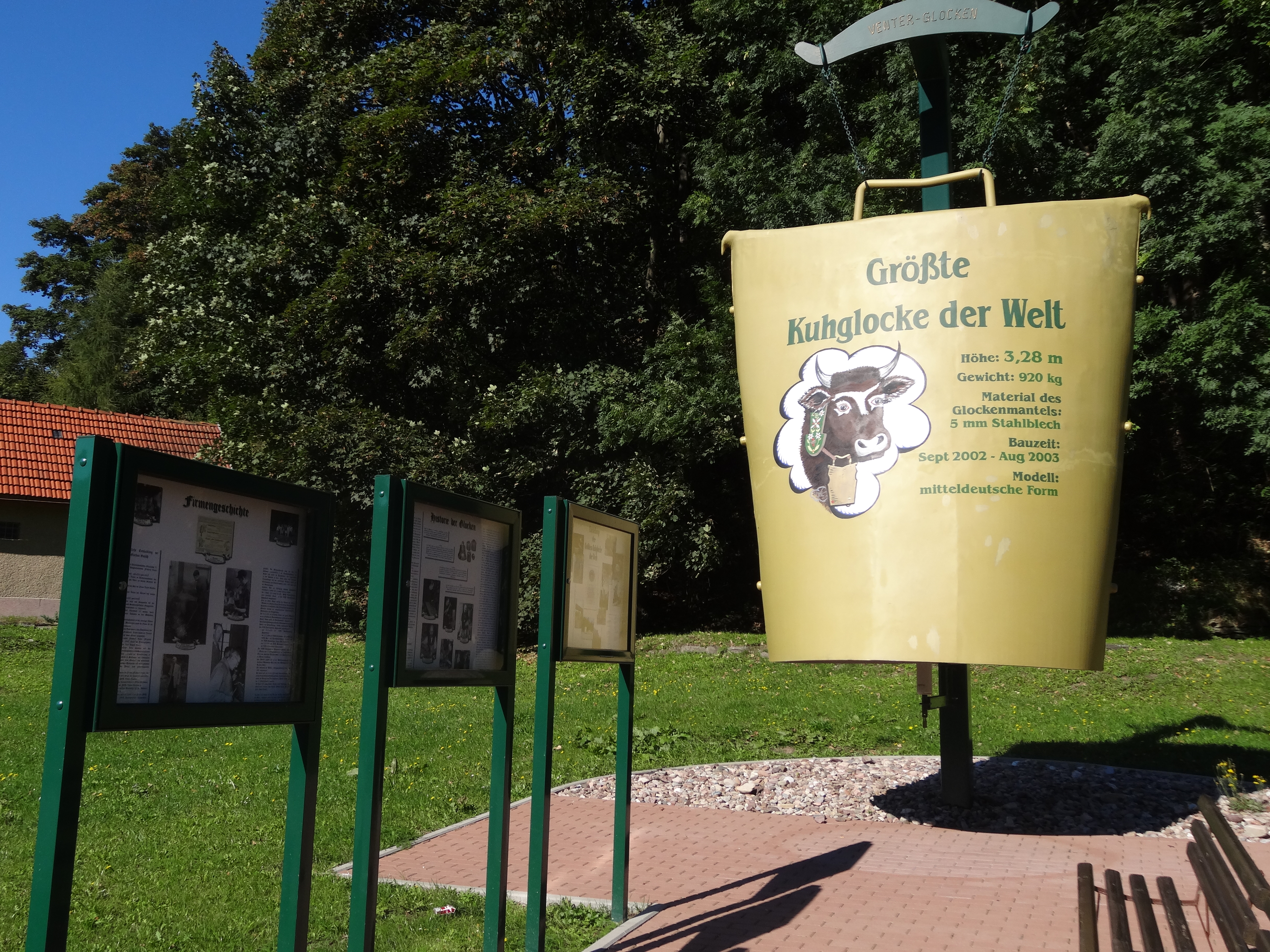
World's largest cow bell

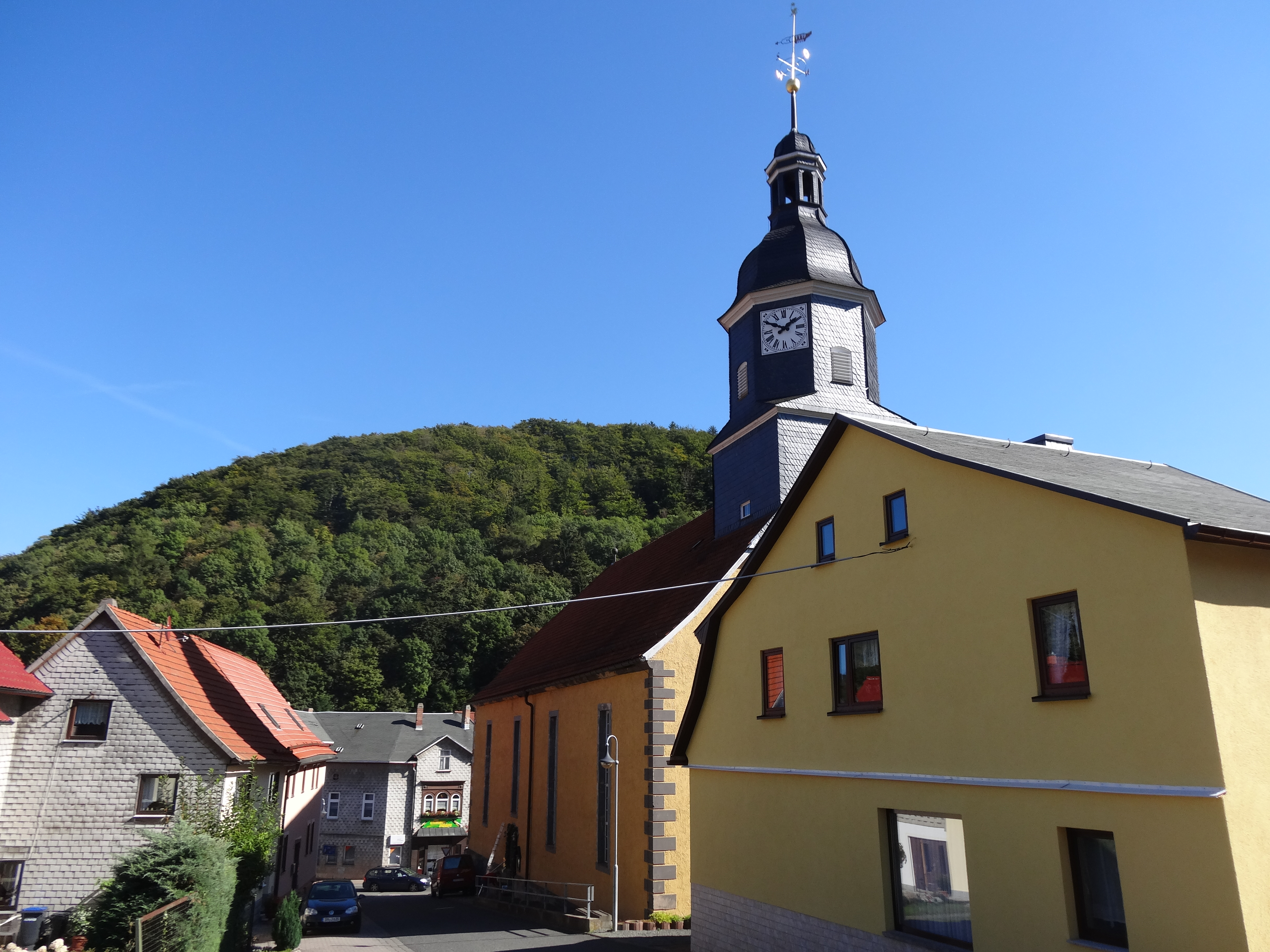
Hessian church

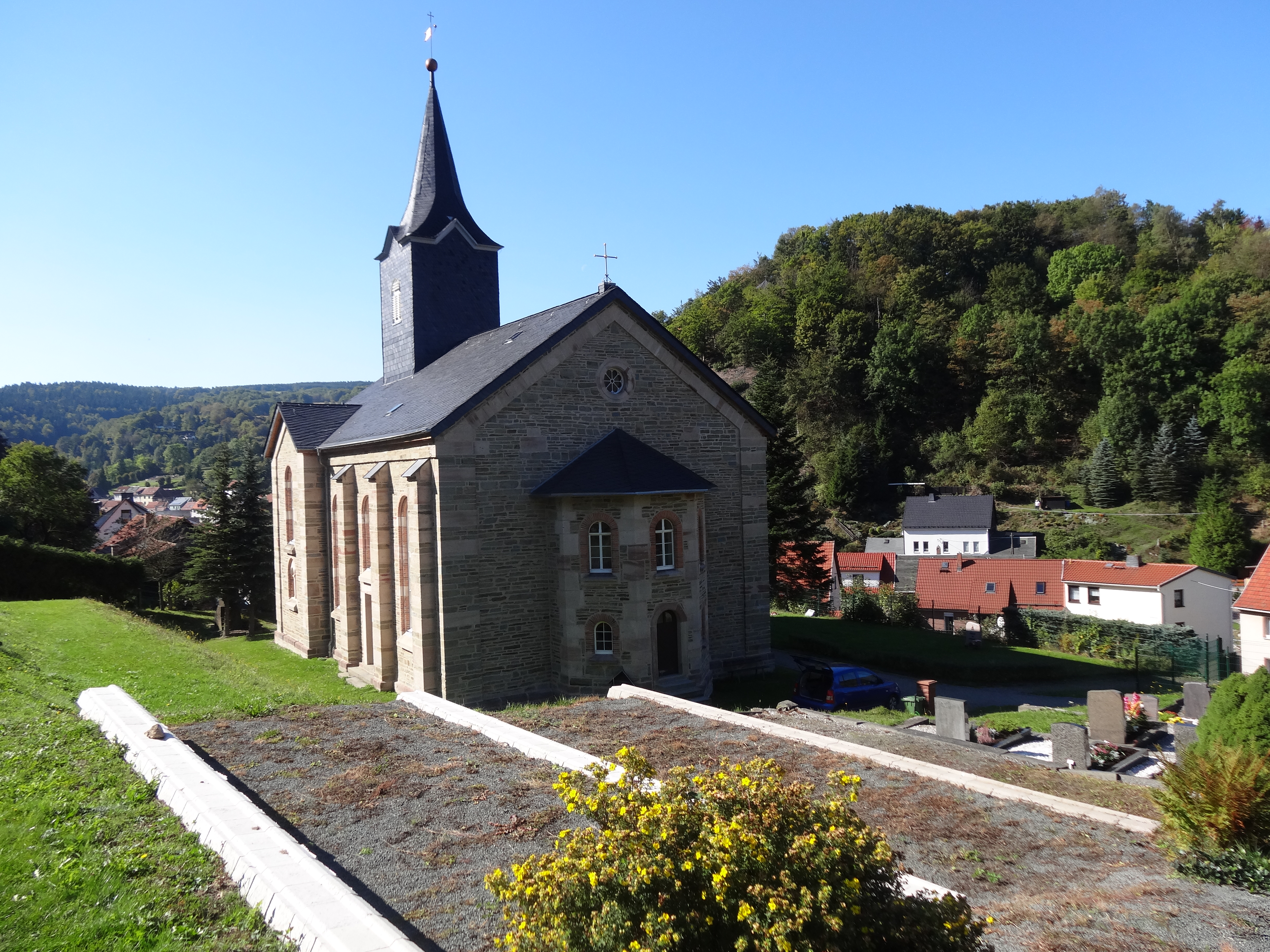
Gothaic church

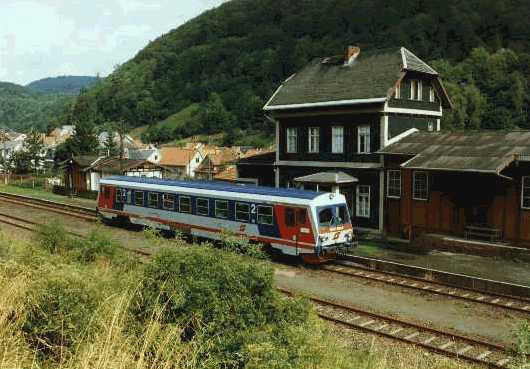
Former railway station

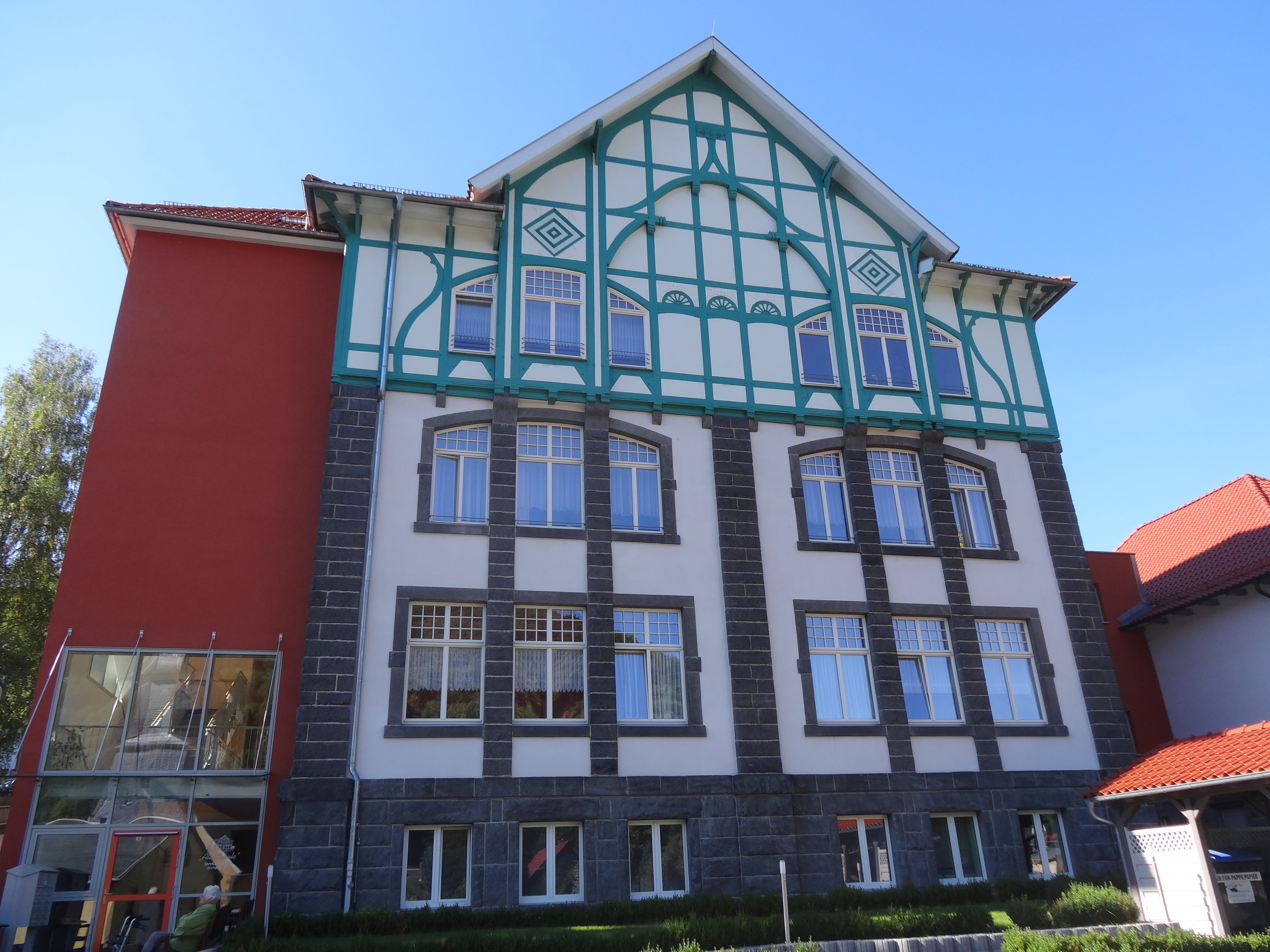
Former school
