= Schmalkalden Moorhead =

Breed of pigeon

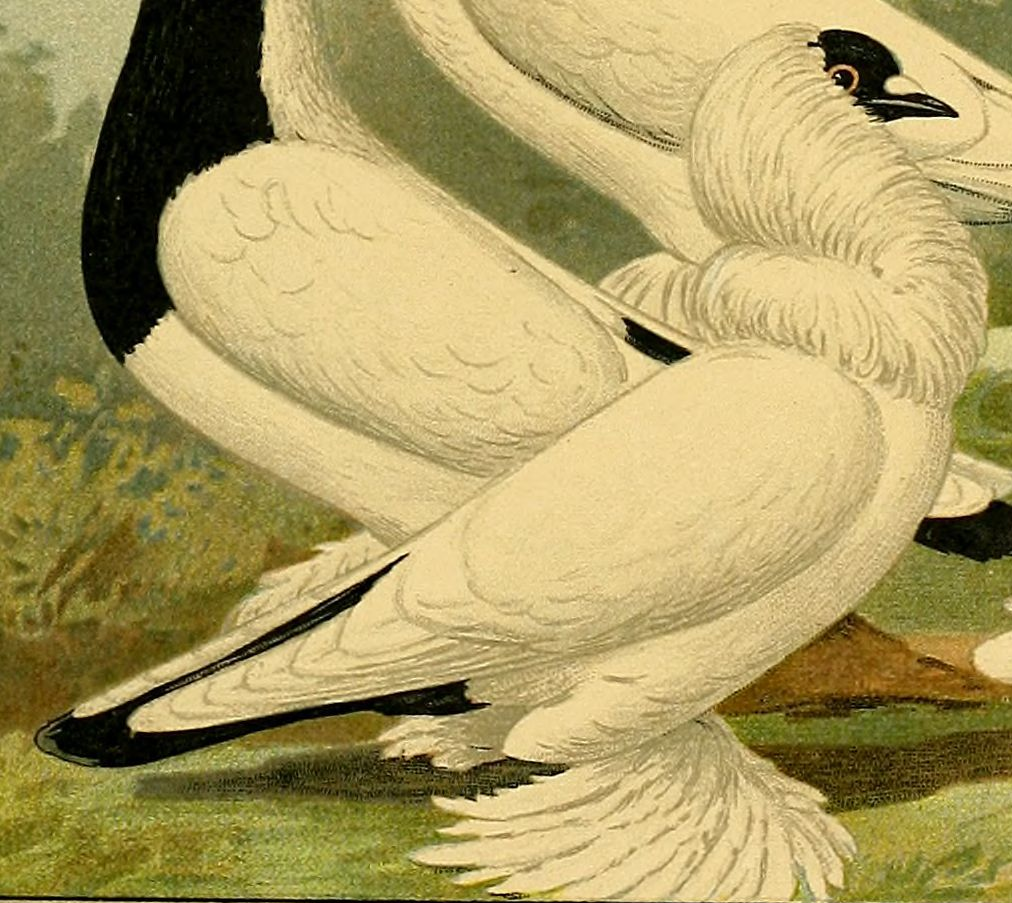
- Conservation status: Common
- Country of origin: Germany

Classification
- US Breed Group: Fancy pigeons
- EE Breed Group: Structure pigeons

The Schmalkalden Moorhead is a breed of fancy pigeon developed over many years of selective breeding. Schmalkalden Moorheads, along with other varieties of domesticated pigeons, are all descendants from the rock pigeon (Columba livia). It was developed at Schmalkalden, Thuringian town in Germany.

== Standard ==
- Origin: Germany, especially Thuringia and the Saxon Erz mountains.
- Element Characteristics:
  - Head: Arched, somewhat high in the forehead.
  - Eyes: Dark.
  - Beak: Long and black on blacks and blues; flesh colored on reds and yellows.
  - Neck: Proportionately long; the feather structure starts its beginning from a more or less stamped out separation at the lower half of the sides of the neck. The feather from this separation extends forward, then above, which forms the supporting feathers, which then enclose the neck, to the sides of the even lying chain as well as over the back of the neck to the mane. The mane extends unbroken into the hood, which lies behind the top of the head. The whole structure should be as long feathered, rigid, and thick as possible.
  - Breast: Low, well rounded.
  - Wings: Long, closed, the flight tips not crossing when resting on the tail.
  - Tail: Long, carried closed.
  - Legs: As low standing as possible, muffs as large and thick as possible.
- Colors and Markings: The head, bib, tail, rump, and wedge under tail are colored. The remaining feathers are white. Black, red, and yellow are lustrous in color. Blue is light and even in color with a black tail band.

== See also ==
- Pigeon Diet
- Pigeon Housing
- List of pigeon breeds
