= Hans Seger =

German prehistorian (1864–1943)

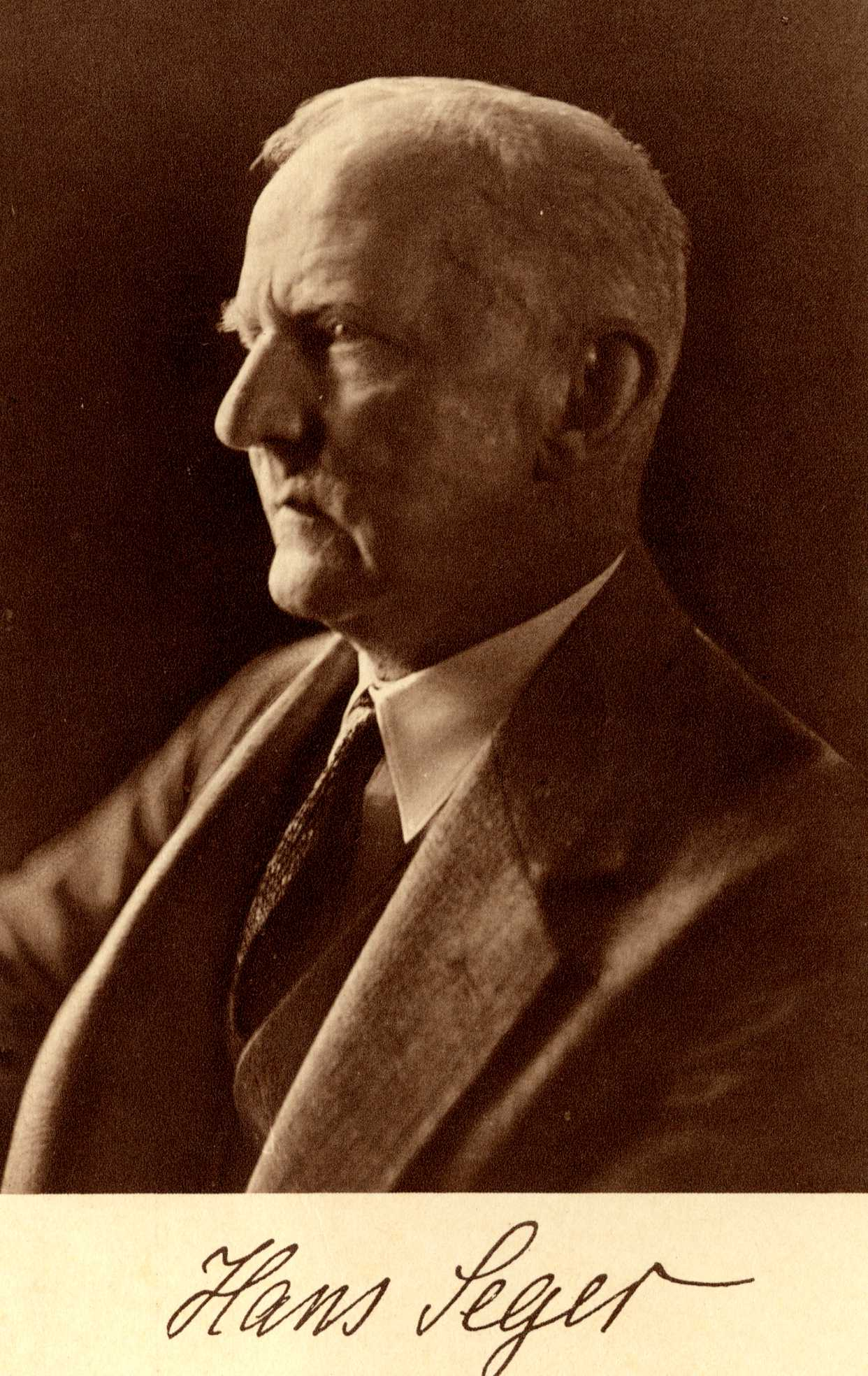
Hans Seger around 1930

Hans Seger (August 28, 1864 in Neurode, Silesia – August 15, 1943 in Breslau) was a German prehistorian.

== Life ==
Hans Seger studied Classical Archeology and Art History in Breslau with August Rossbach, Robert Vischer, and August Schmarsow and in Munich with Heinrich von Brunn, Richard Muther, and Berthold Riehl. In December 1892 he succeeded Eugen von Czihaks as director of the Museum schlesischer Alterthümer (Museum of Silesian Antiquities) in Breslau. He habilitated in 1907 and worked as honorary professor at the University of Breslau. His specialization was the prehistory of Silesia. He excavated a Neolithic settlement near Jordansmühl, which gave rise to the term Jordansmühl Culture. His successor as museum director in 1899 was Karl Masner.

== Memberships and Honors ==
- 1904 Corresponding member of the Antiquarian Cociety Prussia (Altertumsgesellschaft Prussia)
- 1904 Corresponding member of the Royal Academy of History and Ancient Studies Stockholm
- 1906 Ordinary member of the Royal Nordiske Oldskriftselskab Copenhagen
- 1912 Corresponding member of the Danzig Research Society (Naturforschende Gesellschaft in Danzig)
- 1912 Corresponding member of the Anthropological Society in Vienna
- 1913 Foreign member of the Finnish Antiquities Society in Helsinki
- 1919 Awarded the Virchow badge of the Berlin Society for Anthropology, Ethnology and Prehistory
- 1922 Honorary member of the Prussian Antiquity Society in Königsberg
- 1928 Ordinary member of the Archäologischen Institutes des Deutschen Reiches
- 1933 Honorary member of the Society of Antiquaries of London
- 1936 member of the Academy of Sciences Leopoldina
