= Christoph Cellarius =

German classical scholar

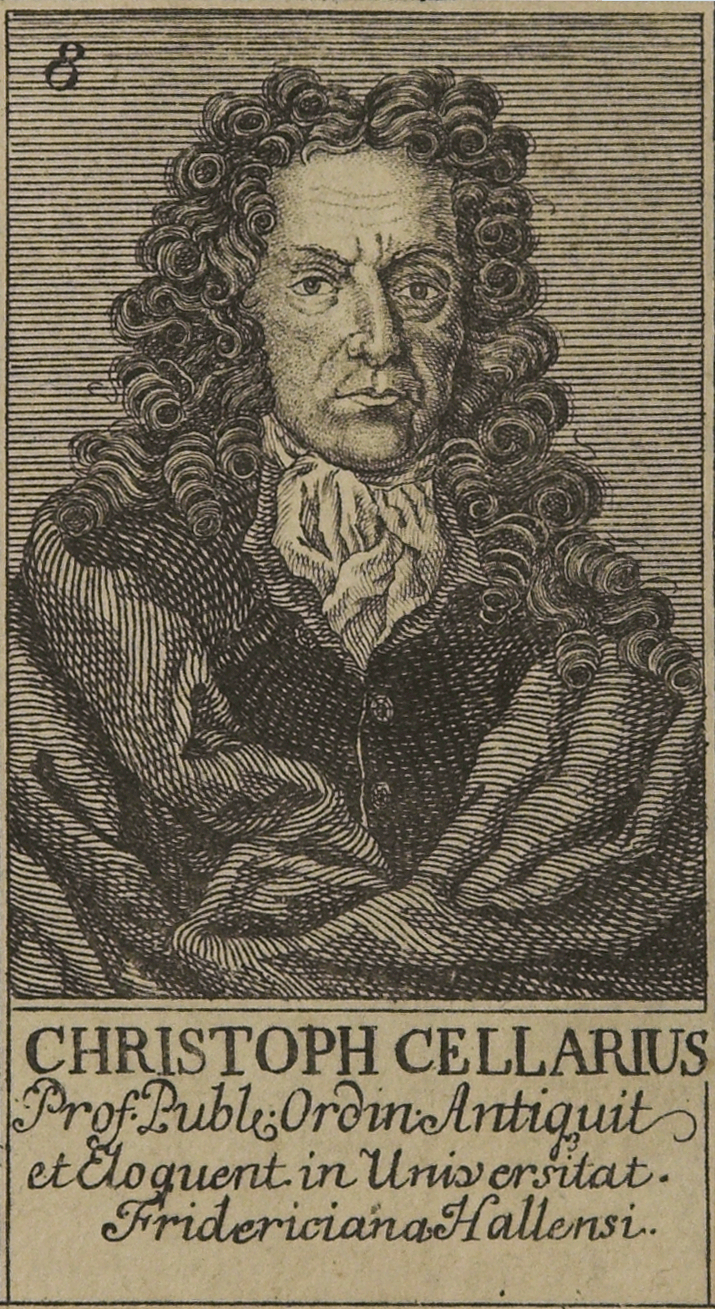
Christoph Cellarius

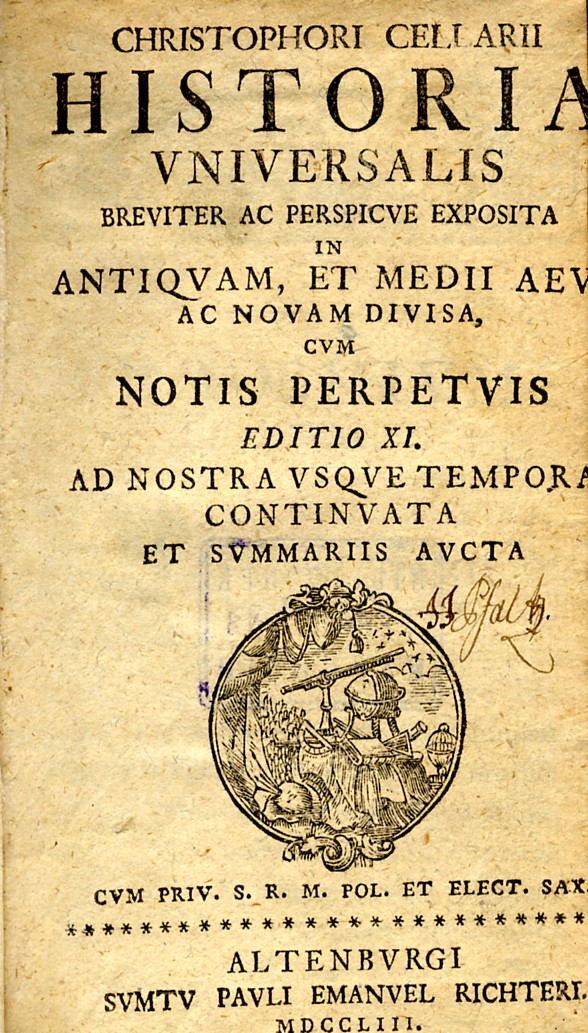
Historia universalis breviter ac perspicue exposita, in antiquam, et medii aevi ac novam divisa, cum notis perpetuis (1685)

Christoph (Keller) Cellarius (22 November 1638 – 4 June 1707) was a German classical scholar from Schmalkalden who held positions in Weimar and Halle. Although the Ancient-Medieval-Modern division of history was used earlier by Italian Renaissance scholars Leonardo Bruni and Flavio Biondo, Cellarius' Universal History Divided into an Ancient, Medieval, and New Period (1685) helped popularize it. After him, this tripartite division became standard.

The library of the University of Applied Sciences in Schmalkalden bears his name; it is called the "Cellarius Bibliothek" in his honor.

== Bibliography ==
- Goethe, Johann Wolfgang von (1824). Memoirs of Goethe. London: Henry Colburn.

== See also ==
- Universal history
- Periodization
