= Ernst Hoeltzer =

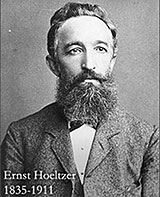
- Born: 7 January 1835; Kleinschmalkalden, Germany
- Died: 3 July 1911 (aged 76); Isfahan, Iran
- Known for: Telegraphist, photographer

Ernst Hoeltzer (7 January 1835 – 3 July 1911) was a German telegraphist and photographer. He came to Iran during the rule of Naser al-Din Shah in the Qajar dynasty and lived in Isfahan for about 20 years (1871–98). He captured historical photos of the city and the sites around it.

== Life ==
Ernst Hoeltzer was born on 7 January 1835 in Kleinschmalkalden in Thuringia. From 1844 to 1848 he attended the Schnepfenthal Salzmann School. Before going to Iran Hoeltzer worked for Siemens & Halske cable company in the Mediterranean. Hoeltzer was tasked by the British in Isfahan to run the telegraph center in this city. After the work was completed in 1867, he took a short trip to back to (Germany), where he became acquainted with photography. He bought a camera and other equipment and brought them back to Iran. From 1873 to 1897, Hoeltzer took thousands of photographs in Iran. Most of the photos captured Isfahan but a few also show sites in Tehran, Qom, Soltaniyeh, and Kashan.

== Personal life and legacy ==
In 1870 he married Maryam Haghnazar (1850 – 12 October 1920), an Iranian-Armenian woman from Tehran. After his death, all his property went to his daughter Karolina who married Eskandar Khan Davidkhanian, a General in the town of Jolfa, Isfahan. Karolina lived in Tehran and had two daughters, Ricolletta and Hildegard. After World War II, Ricolletta married a German man and carrying all her grandfather's belongings, went to live in Germany. She put Hoeltzer's five large wooden cases in her basement. In 1969, after a pipe broke in the basement, the cases were brought out and opened.The cases held a considerate number of glass containers with negatives of his photos in addition to notebooks with chemical instructions and Hoeltzer's diary. In 1975, a number of Hoeltzer's photos were put on public display which included a collection of 100 photographs from Jolfa. Prints of these photos came into the possession of Mohammad Assemi, who sent them to the Ministry of Culture in Tehran. A selection first appeared in 1976 under the title Persia 113 Years Ago and again in 2004 under the title Thousand Sights of Life. Pictures taken of Isfahan by Hoeltzer"s were also collected in a book published in 1976.

== Death ==
Ernst Hoeltzer died in Isfahan on 7 July 1911. He is buried in the Armenian cemetery in Isfahan.

== gallery ==
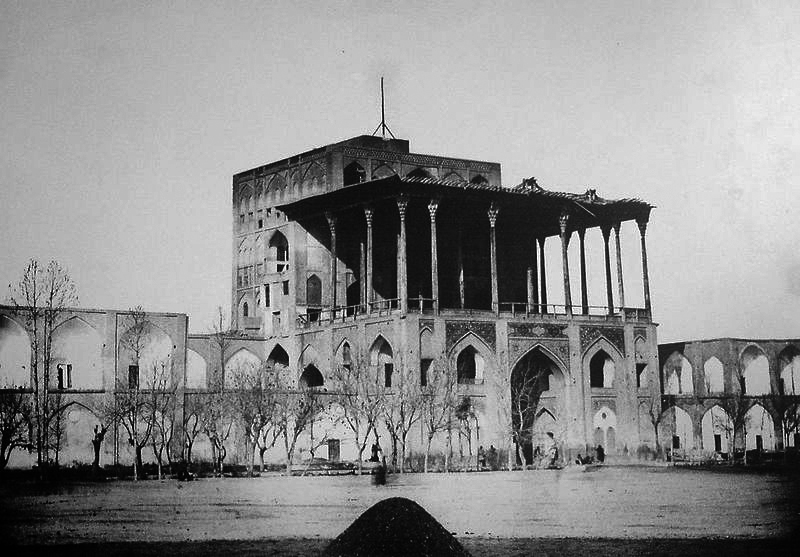
Ali Qapu building in Naqsh-e Jahan Square, Isfahan

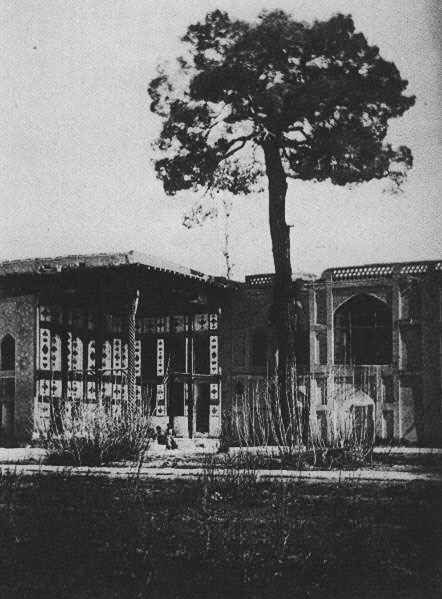
Haft-Dast

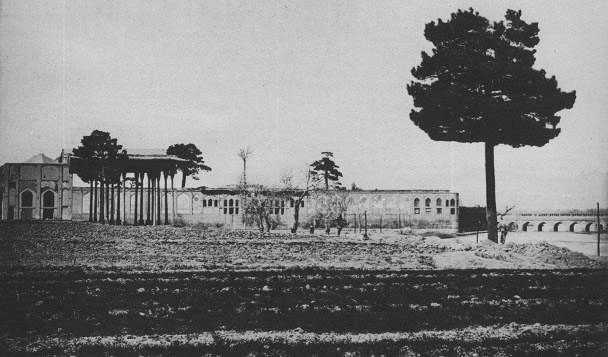
Haftdast Palace and Ayene-Khaneh

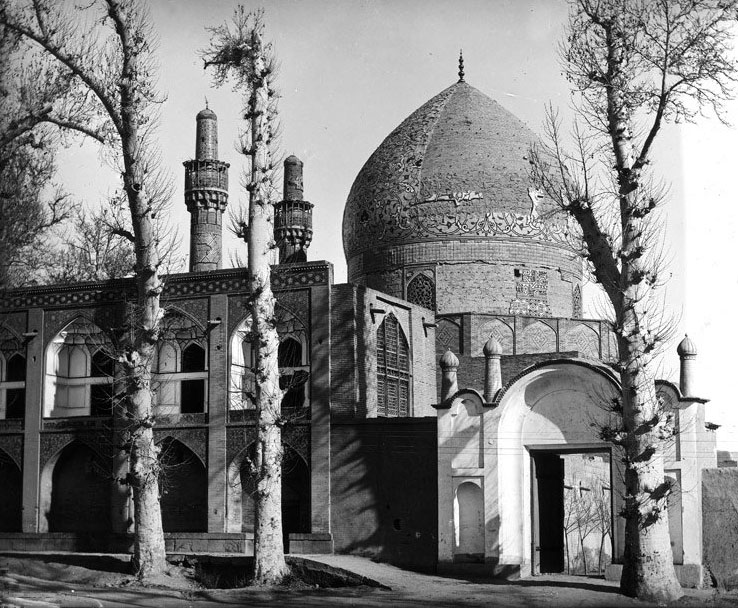
Chaharbagh School

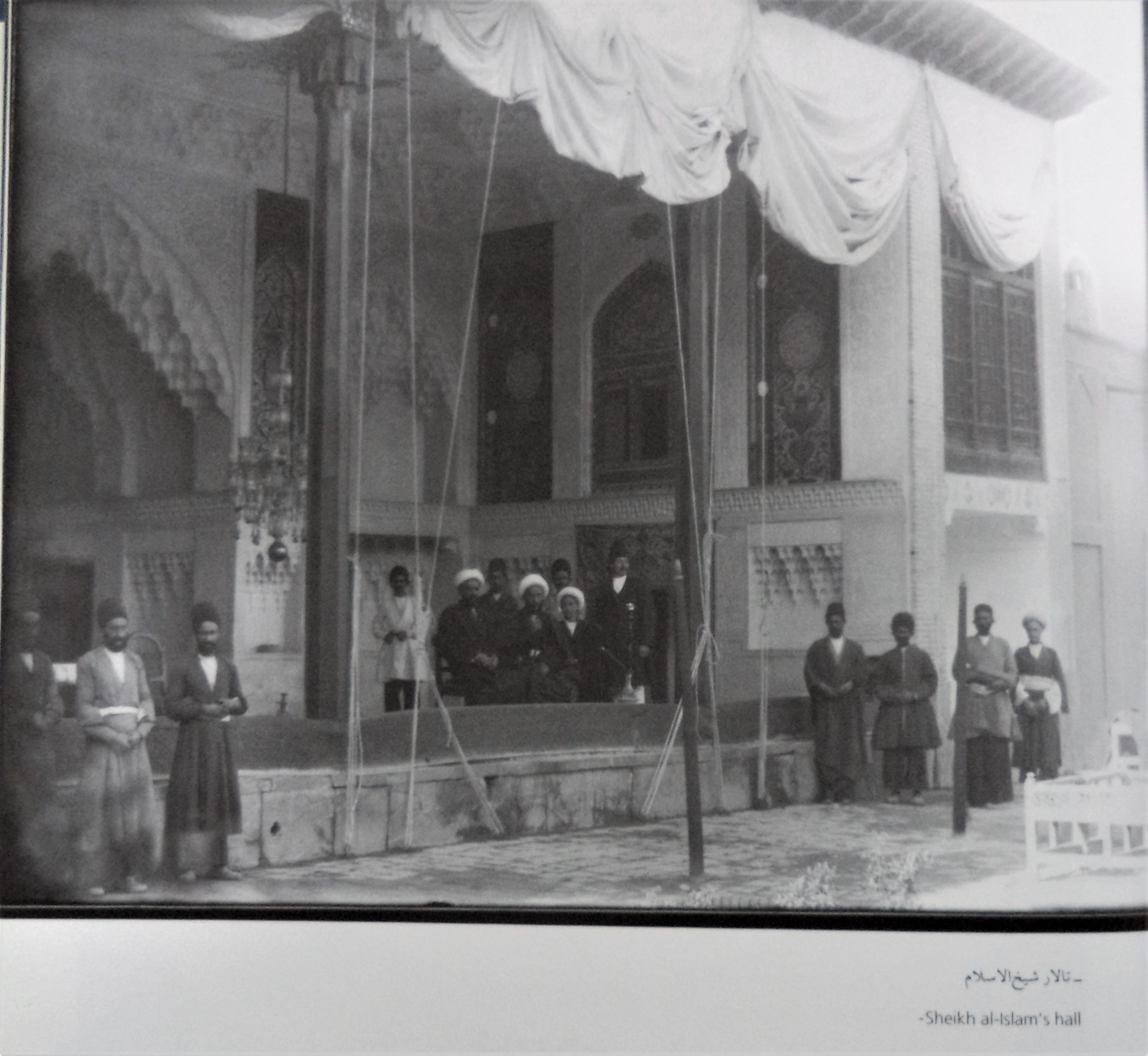
Sheykh ol-Eslam's House
