= Ali Qapu =

UNESCO World Heritage Site in Isfahan, Iran

- عالی‌قاپو, ‘Ālī Qāpū
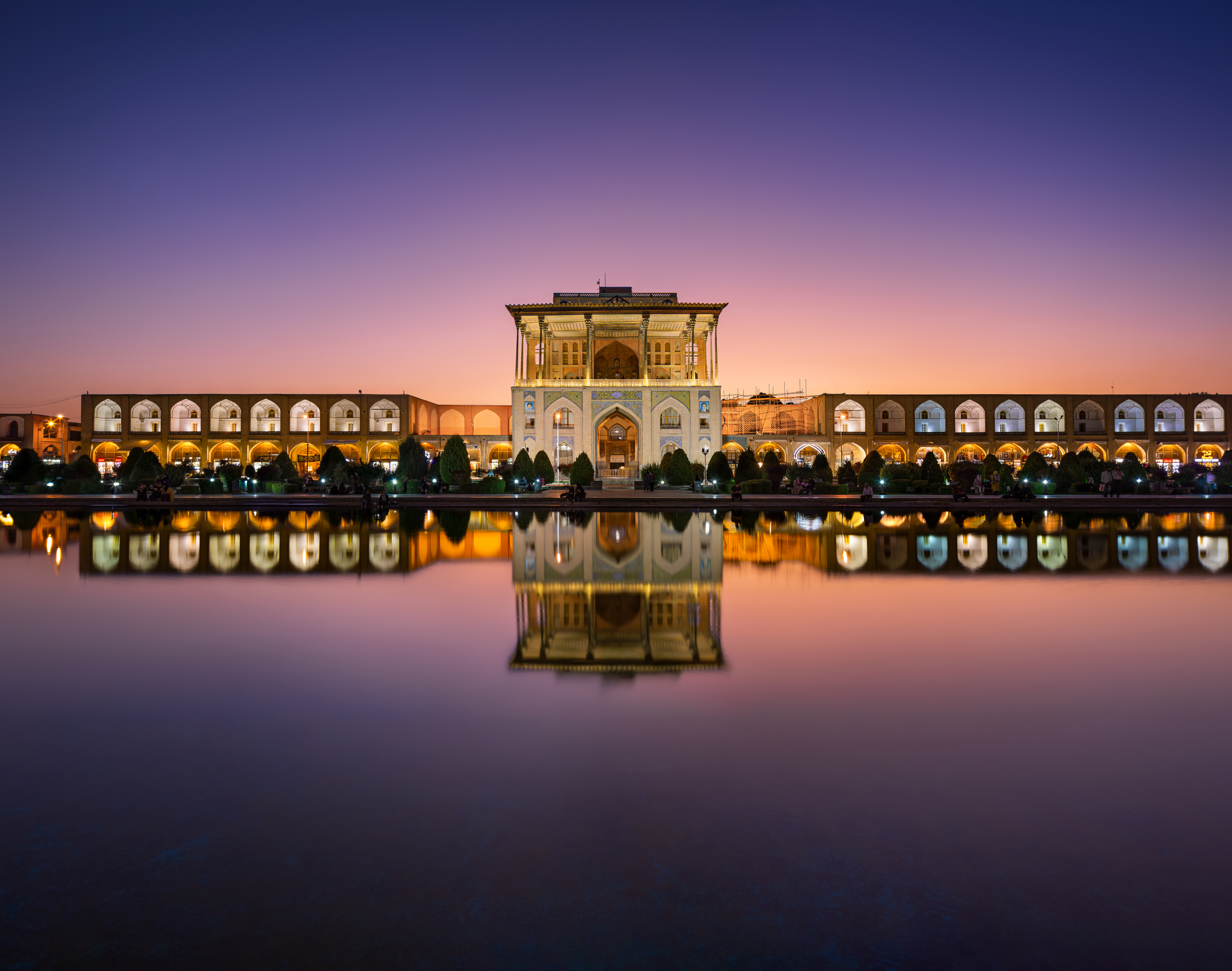
- Ali Qapu photographed during the golden hour

General information
- Type: Royal palace; Imperial residence
- Architectural style: Safavid; Persian
- Location: Isfahan, Iran
- Opened: 1597
- Client: Safavid Emperors
- Owner: Islamic Republic of Iran
- Location within Iran

UNESCO World Heritage Site
- Official name: Naqsh-e Jahan square and Ali Qapu Palace
- Location: Isfahan, Isfahan Province, Iran
- Criteria: Cultural: (i)(v)(vi)
- Reference: 115
- Inscription: 1979 (3rd Session)
- Coordinates: 32°39′26″N 51°40′36″E

Iran National Heritage List
- Official name: Ali Qapu Palace
- Type: Palace
- Designated: 1932
- Reference no.: 104
- Conservation organization: Cultural Heritage, Handicrafts and Tourism Organization of Iran

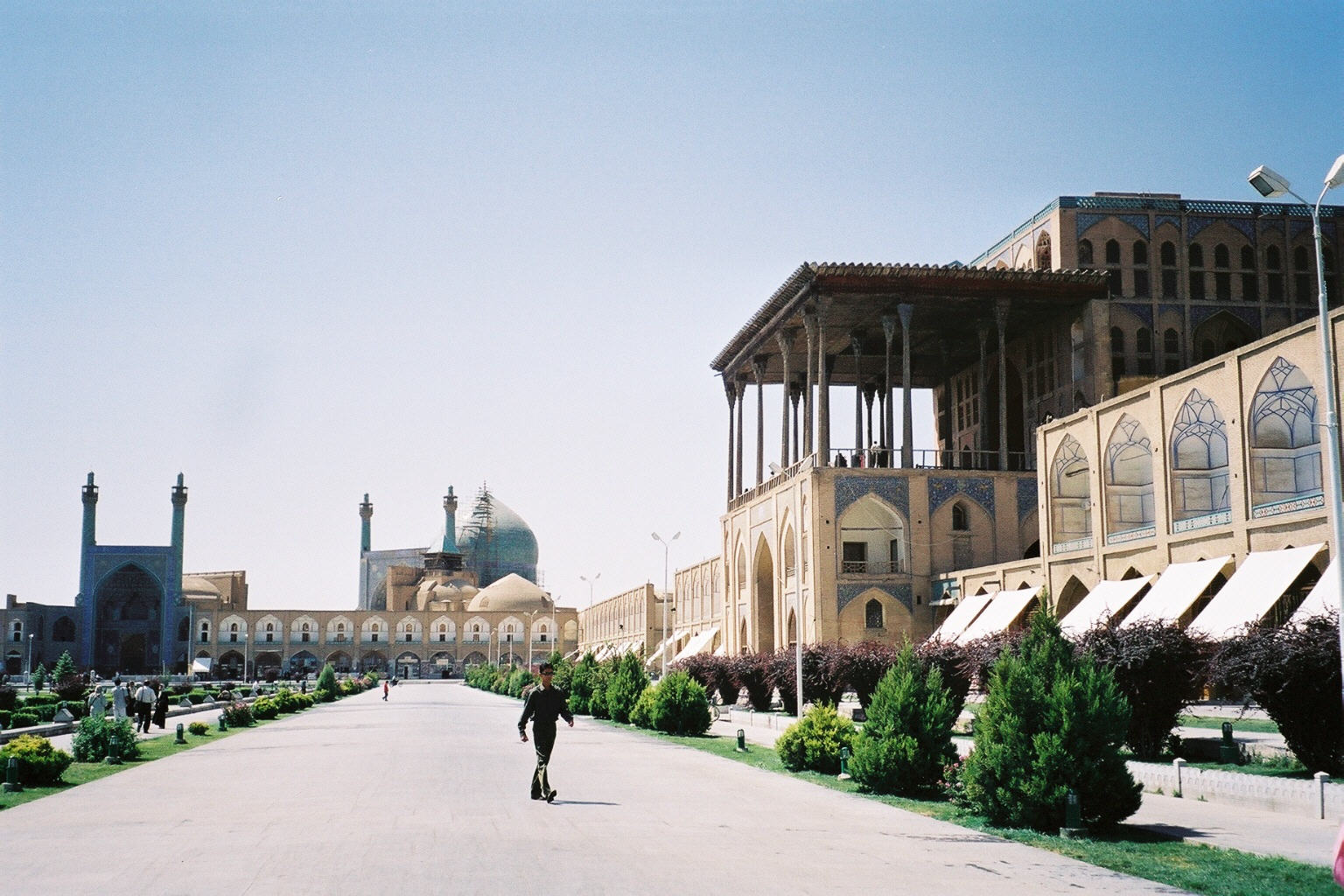
Exterior view of the palace

Ali Qapu (Persian: عالی‌قاپو, romanized: ‘Ālī Qāpū, lit. 'Grand Gate') is an imperial palace in Isfahan, Iran. It is located on the western side of Naqsh-e Jahan Square, opposite to Sheikh Lotfollah Mosque, and had originally been designed as a vast portal entrance to the grand palace which stretched from the square to Chaharbagh Boulevard. UNESCO inscribed the Palace and the Square as a World Heritage Site due to their cultural and historical importance.

The palace is forty-eight meters high and there are six floors, each accessible by a difficult spiral staircase. In the sixth floor, Music Hall, deep circular niches are found in the walls, having not only aesthetic value, but also acoustic. Ali Qapu is regarded as the best example of Safavid architecture and a symbol of Iran's Islamic heritage.

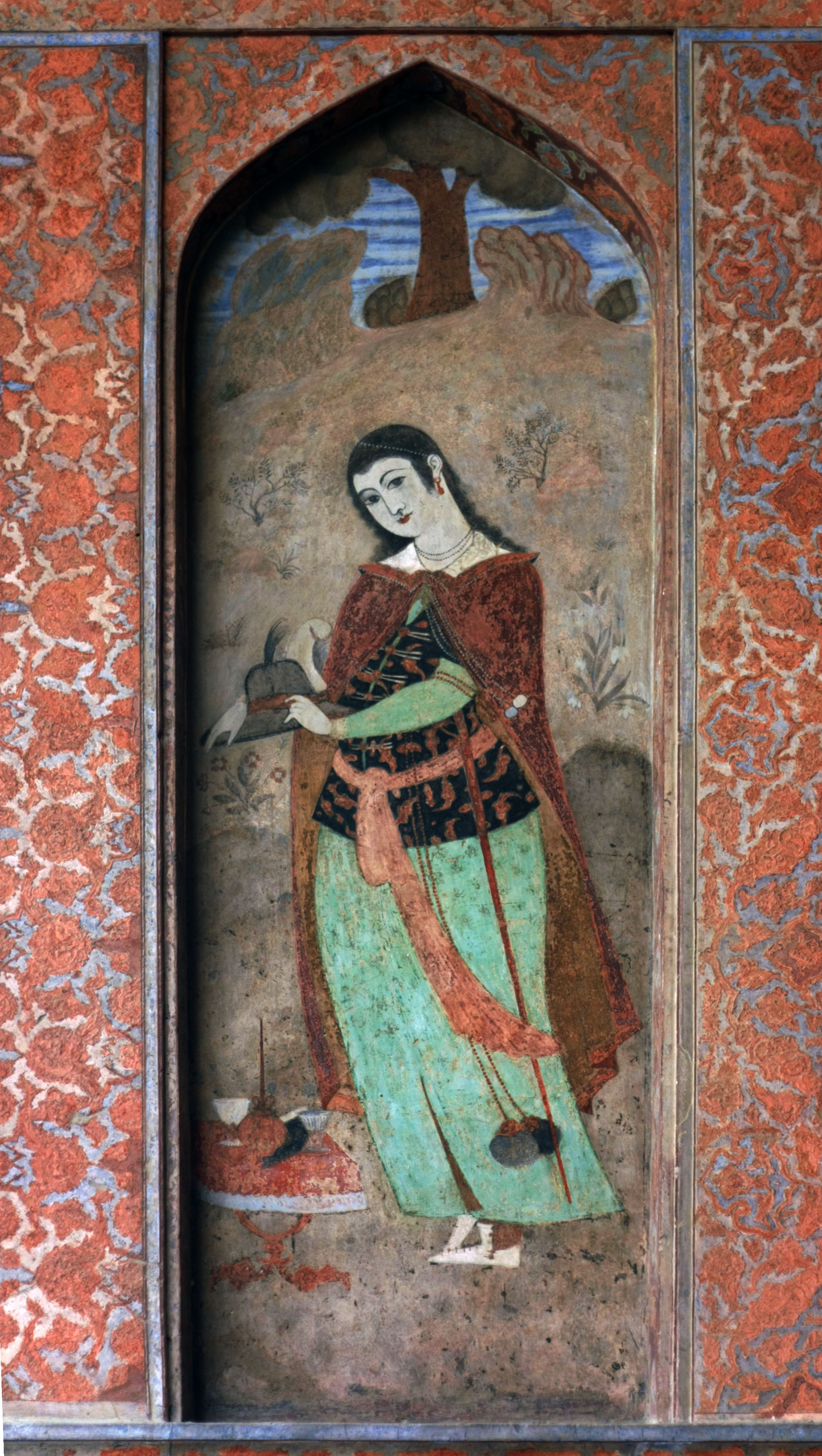
Fresco from the portico of the palace, depicting a Persian woman

The name Ali Qapuis is derived from Arabic ‘Ālī (meaning "imperial" or "great"), and Turkic Qāpū (meaning "gate"), was given to this place as it was right at the entrance to the Safavid palaces which stretched from the Naqsh-e Jahan Square to the Chahar Baq Boulevard. The building was built by decree of Shah Abbas the Great in the early 17th century. It was here that the Safavid monarchs used to entertain noble visitors, and foreign ambassadors. Shah Abbas, here for the first time, celebrated the Nowruz (Iranian New Year) of 1006 AH/1597 C.E.

Wall decorations were highly favoured in palace decorations and Ali Qapu was no exception. Ali Qapu is rich in naturalistic wall paintings by Reza Abbasi, the court painter of Shah Abbas I, and his pupils. There are floral, animal, and bird motifs in his works. The highly ornamented doors and windows of the palace have almost all been pillaged at times of social anarchy. Only one window on the third floor has escaped the ravages of time. Ali Qapu was repaired and restored substantially during the reign of Shah Soltan Hoseyn, the last Safavid ruler, but fell into a dreadful state of dilapidation again during the short reign of invading Afghans. Under the reign of Naser ad-Din Shah Qajar (1848–96), the Safavid cornices and floral tiles above the portal were replaced by tiles bearing inscriptions.

Shah Abbas II expanded and renovated Ali Qapu, with his primary addition being the grand hall constructed on the third floor. The hall features 18 columns covered with mirror work and a ceiling decorated with paintings.

The chancellery was stationed on the first floor. On the sixth, the royal reception and banquets were held. The largest rooms are found on this floor. The stucco decoration of the banquet hall abounds in motif of various vessels and cups. The sixth floor was popularly called the Music Hall. Here various ensembles performed music and sang songs.

From the upper galleries, the Safavid shahs watched Chowgan (polo), army maneuvers and horse-racing in the Naqsh-e Jahan square.

The palace is depicted on the reverse of the Iranian 20,000 rials banknote. The palace is also depicted on the reverse of the Iranian 20 rials 1953 banknote series.

== Name and etymology ==
The name of the structure is composed of two words. "Ālī" (عالٍ) means "superior", borrowed from Arabic, while "Qāpū" (𐰴𐰯𐰍) means "door", and was adopted from Old Turkic.

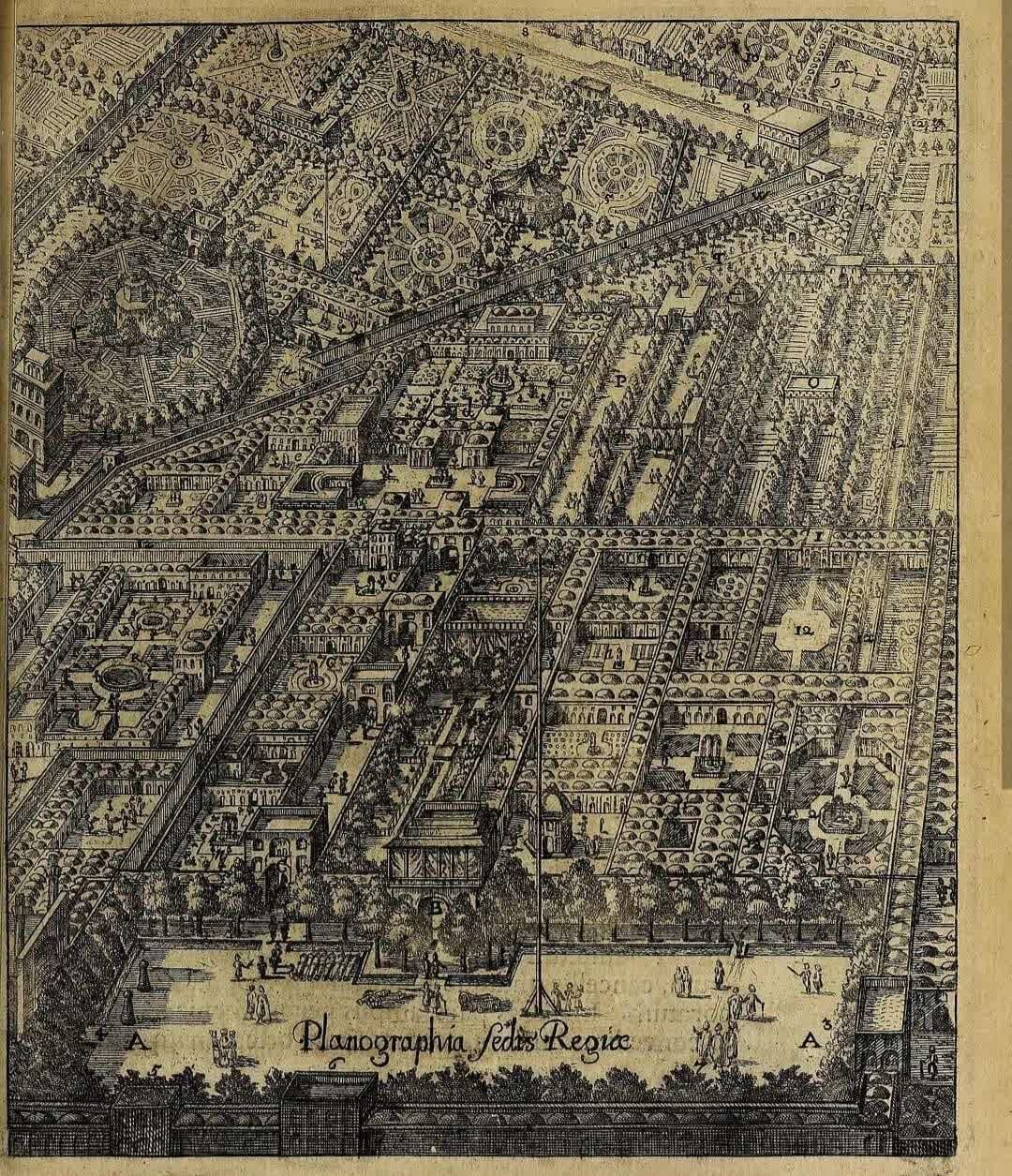
Map of Isfahan dowlatkhaneh, by Engelbert Kaempfer (1651–1716)

== Construction stages ==
Ali Qapu's building was founded in several stages, beginning from a building with a single gate, with entrance to the government building complex, and gradually developed, ending in the existing shape. The period of the development, with intervals, lasted approximately seventy years.

First Stage: The initial building acting as entrance to the complex was in cubical shape and in two stories, with dimensions measuring 20 x 19 meter and 13 meter high.

Second Stage: Foundation of the upper hall, built on the entrance vestibule, with cubical shape, over the initial cubic shape structure with the same height in two visible stories.

Third Stage: Foundation of the fifth story, the Music Amphitheater or the Music Hall, built on the lower hall, using the central room for sky light, and thus the vertical extension being emphasized.

Fourth Stage: Foundation of the eastern verandah or pavilion advancing towards the square, supported by the tower-shaped building. By foundation of this verandah, the entrance vestibule was extended along the main gate and passage to the market, perpendicular to the eastern flank of the building.

Fifth Stage: Foundation of the wooden ceiling of the balcony, supported by 18 wooden columns, and contemporaneous with erection of the ceiling, an additional stairway of the southern flank was founded and was called the Kingly Stairway. This staircase became revered in the architectural world as its style was unique to the region and became a distinctive Persian style.

Sixth Stage: During this stage, a water tower was built in the northern flank for provision of water for the copper pool of the columned balcony. Plaster decorations in reception story and the Music Hall. The Music Hall contains large paintings of rulers, courtisans, singers, and dancers at a feast.

The room on the sixth floor is also decorated with plaster-work, representing pots and vessels and one is famous as the music and sound room. It has cut out decorations around the room, which represent a considerable artistic feat. These cut out shapes were not placed there to act as cupboards; the stucco-work is most delicate and falls to pieces at the highest touch. So we conclude that it was placed in position in these rooms for ornament and decoration. The rooms were used for private parties and for the king's musicians, and these hollow places in the walls retained the echoes and produced the sounds of the singing and musical instruments clearly in all parts.

=== Decorations ===
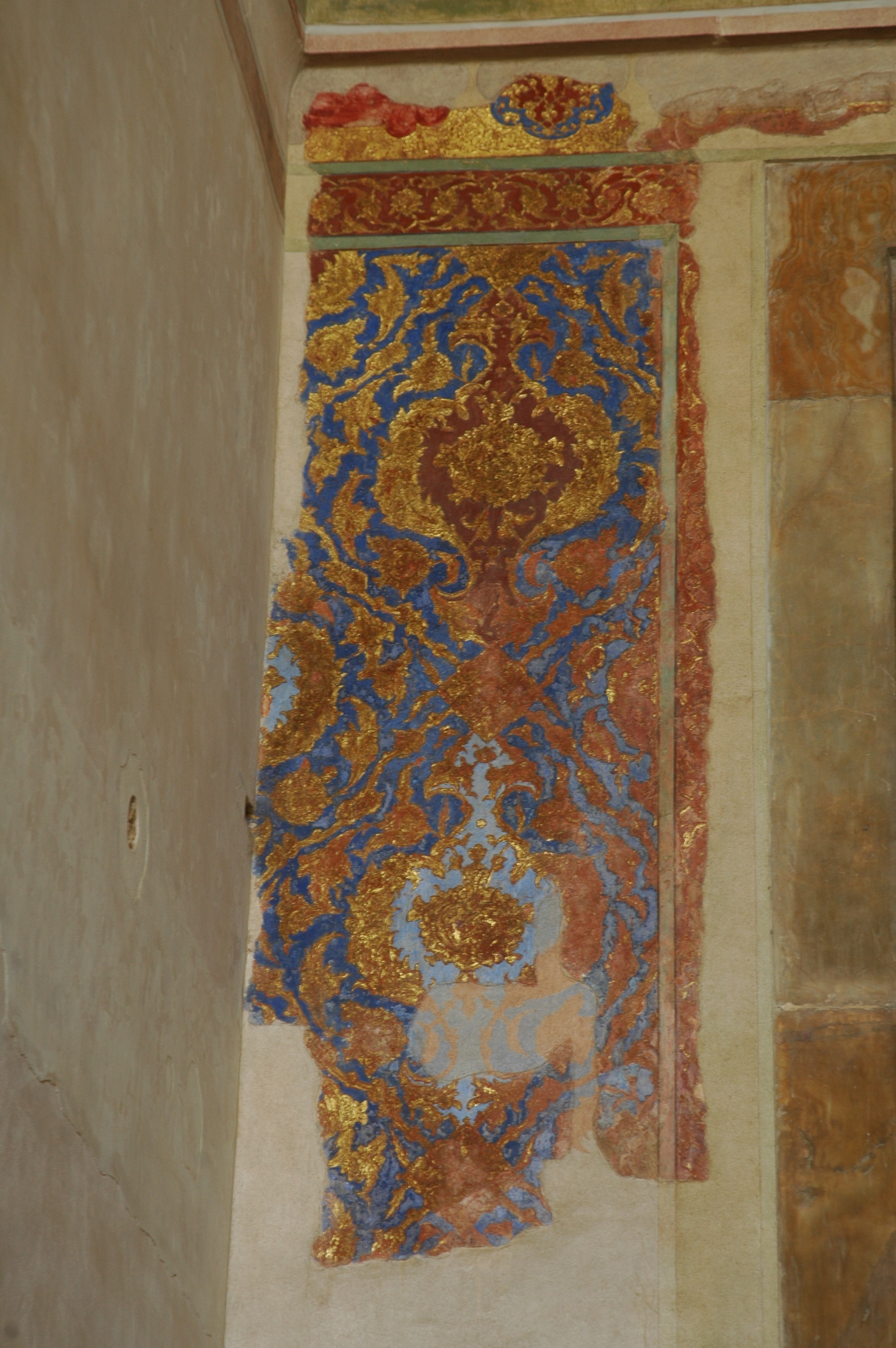
Interior detail of Ali Qapu Palace

The interior of Ali Qapu palace, from the entrance to the highest part of the music hall, has been decorated with the art of Iranian artists. It is mentioned in the inscriptions and writings left in the Ali Qapu mansion that parts of the building were restored during the reign of Shah Sultan Hossein. As a result of many damages, only words and stanzas of the poems can be read on the walls of the palace.

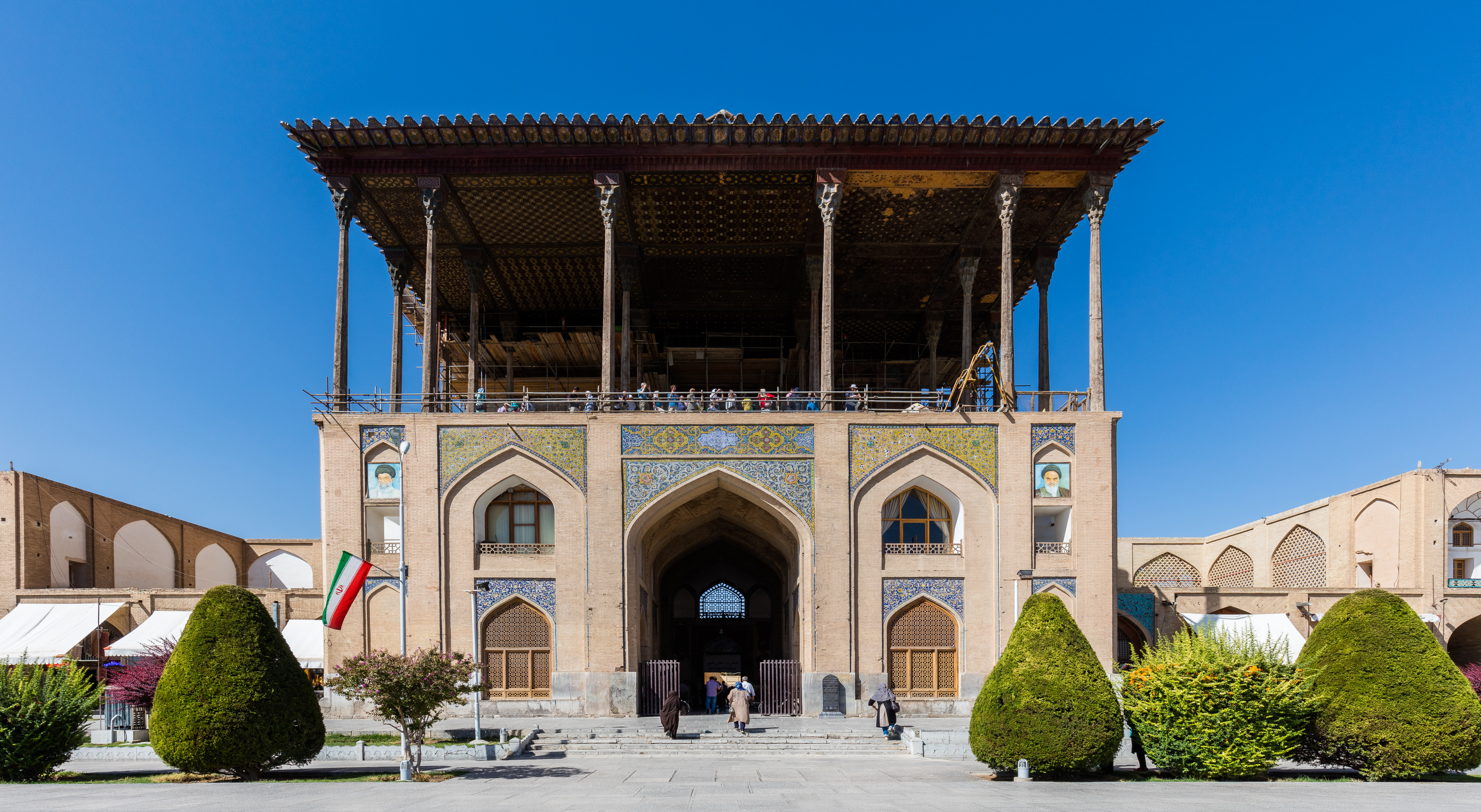
Frontal view

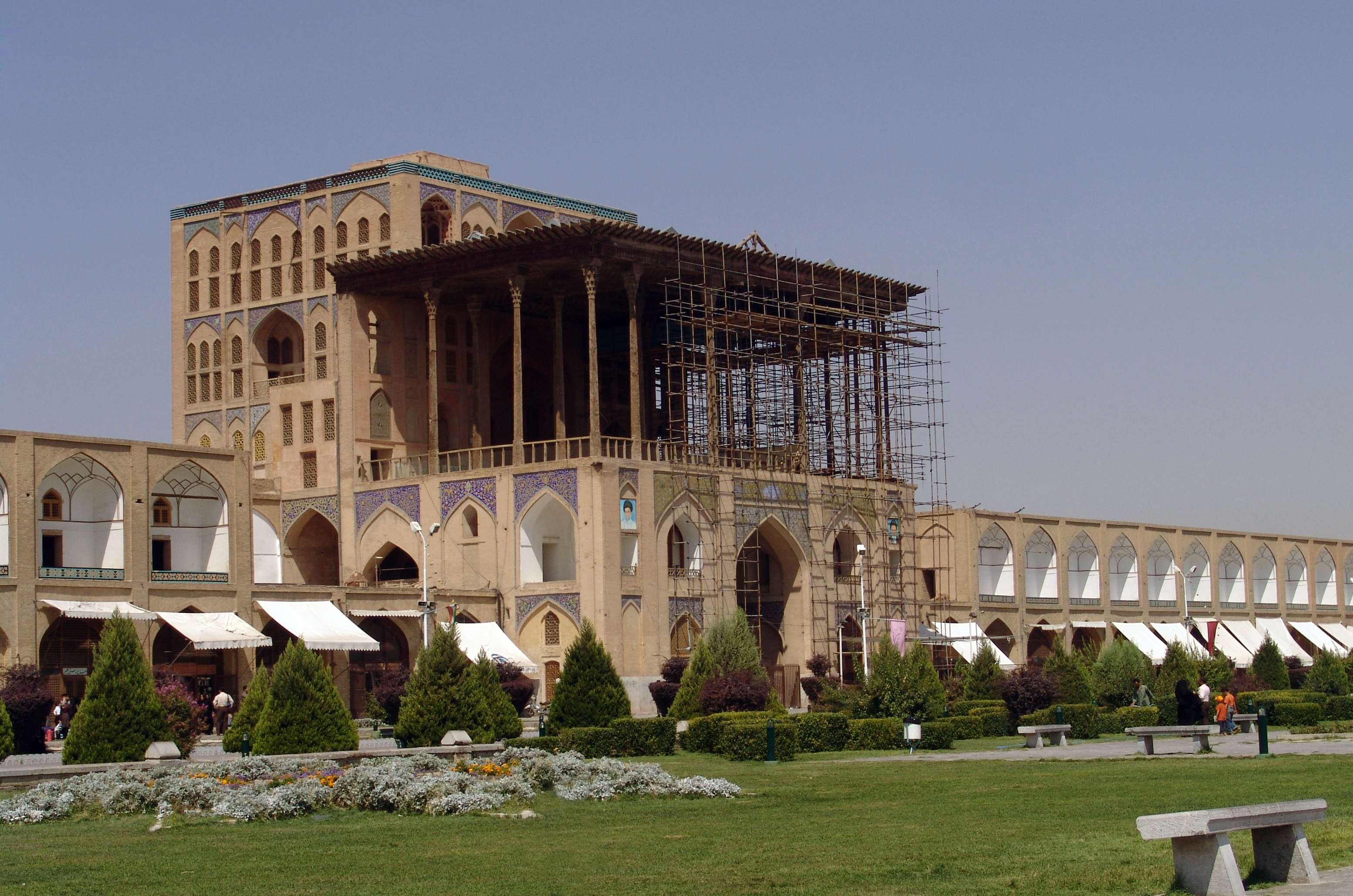
Another view of the palace

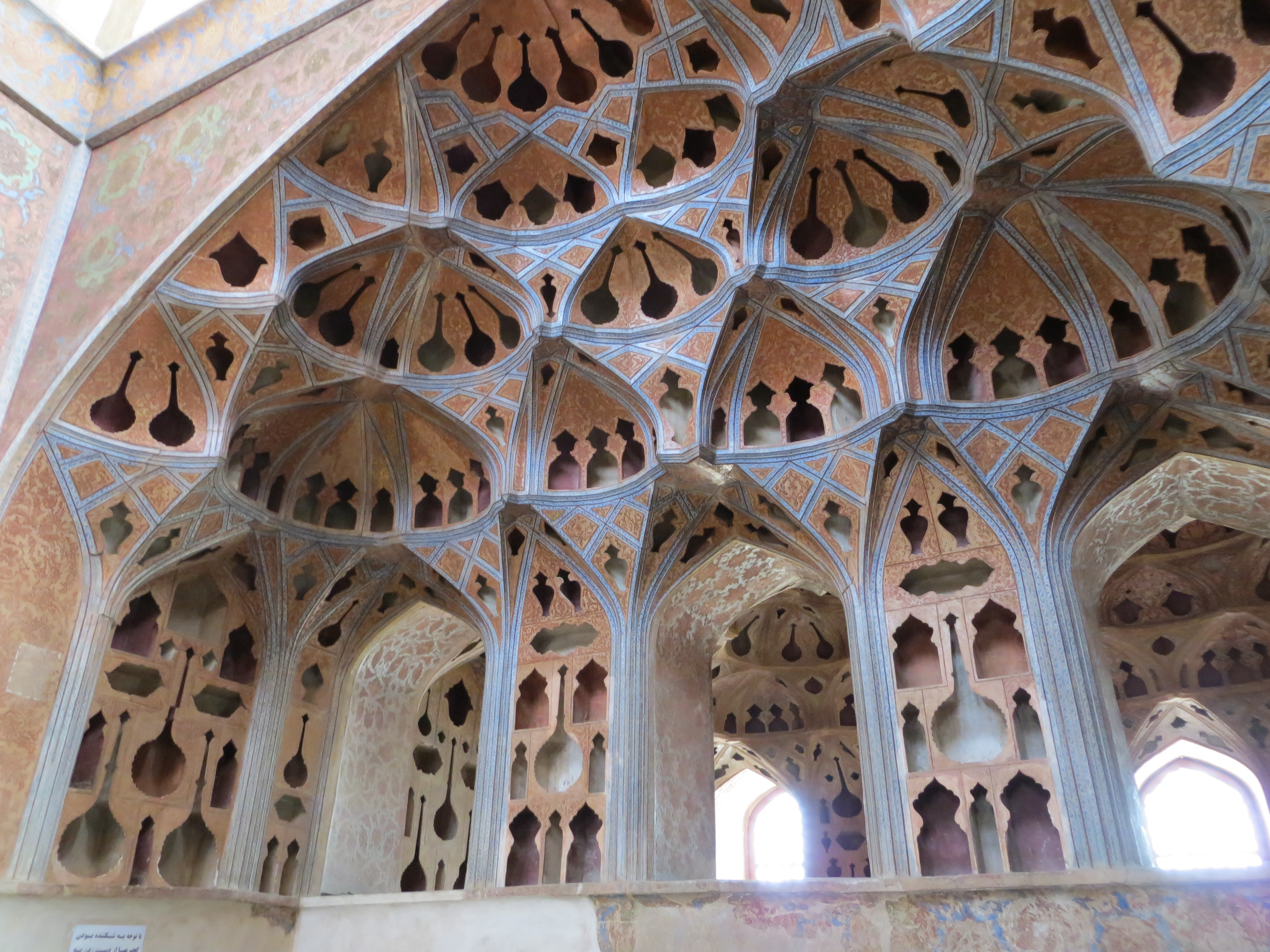
The Music Hall

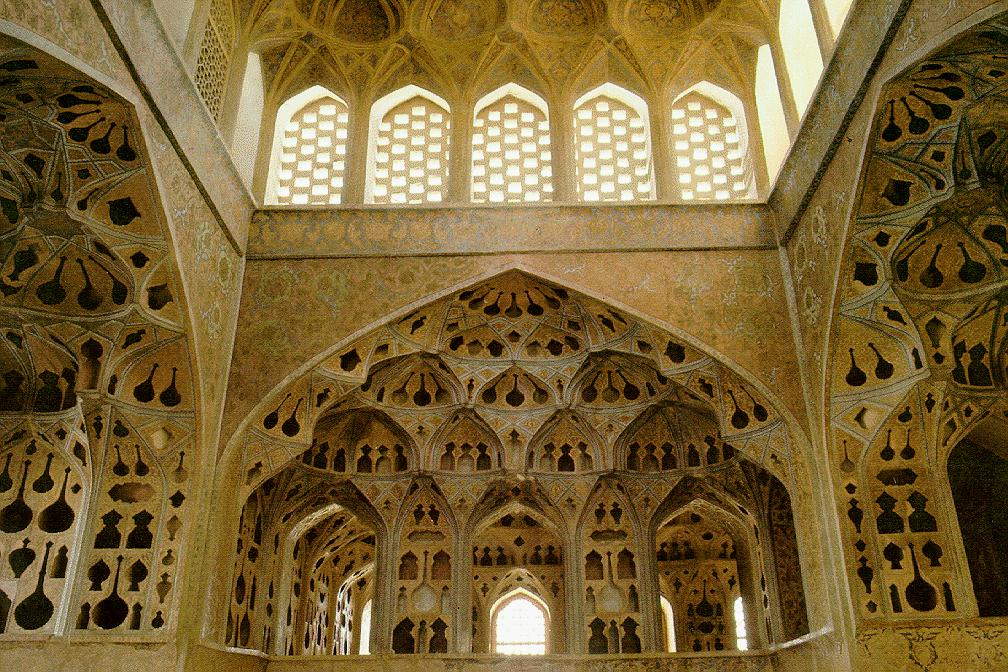
Another view of the Music Hall

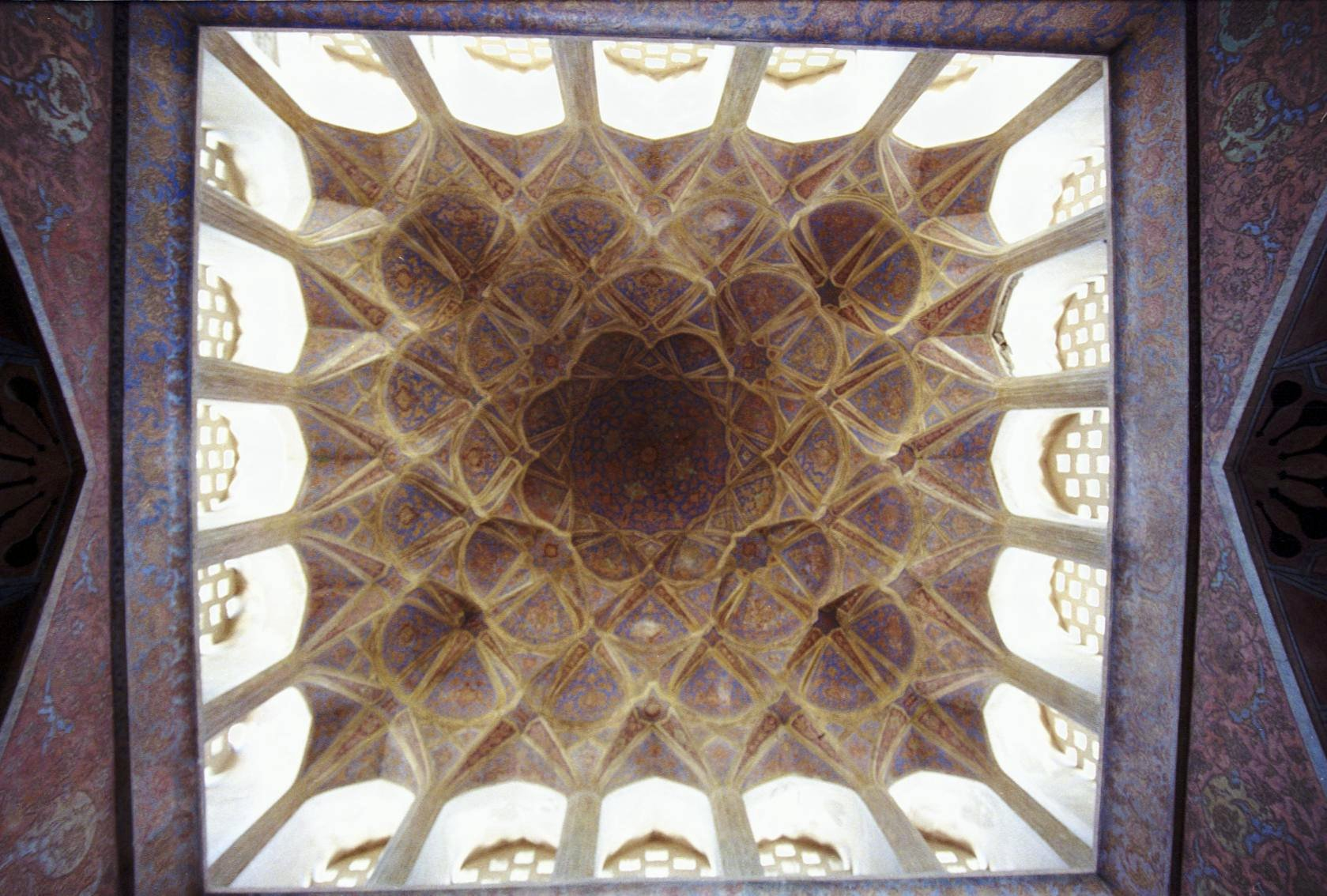
Ceiling of the Music Hall

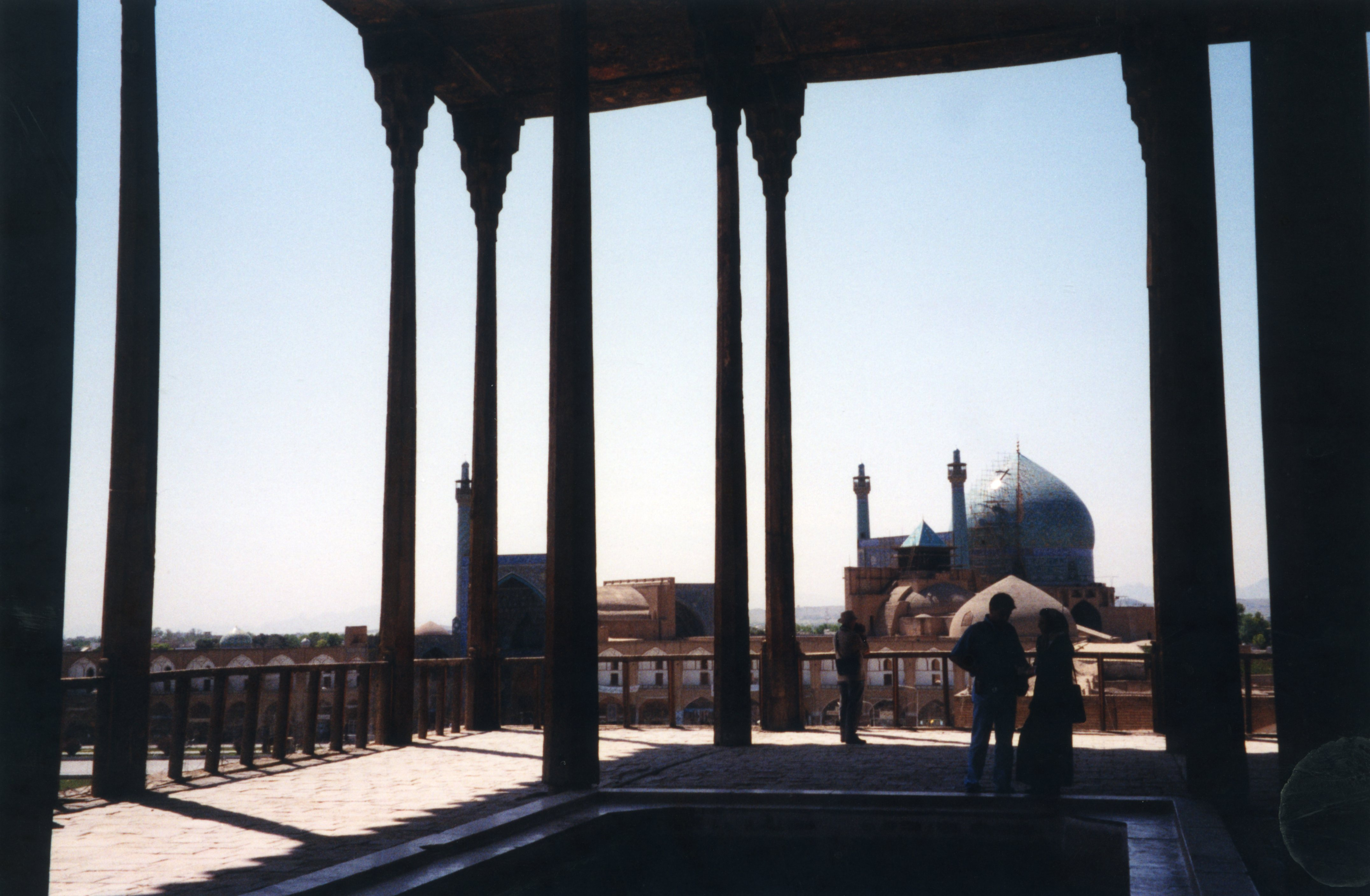
The balcony

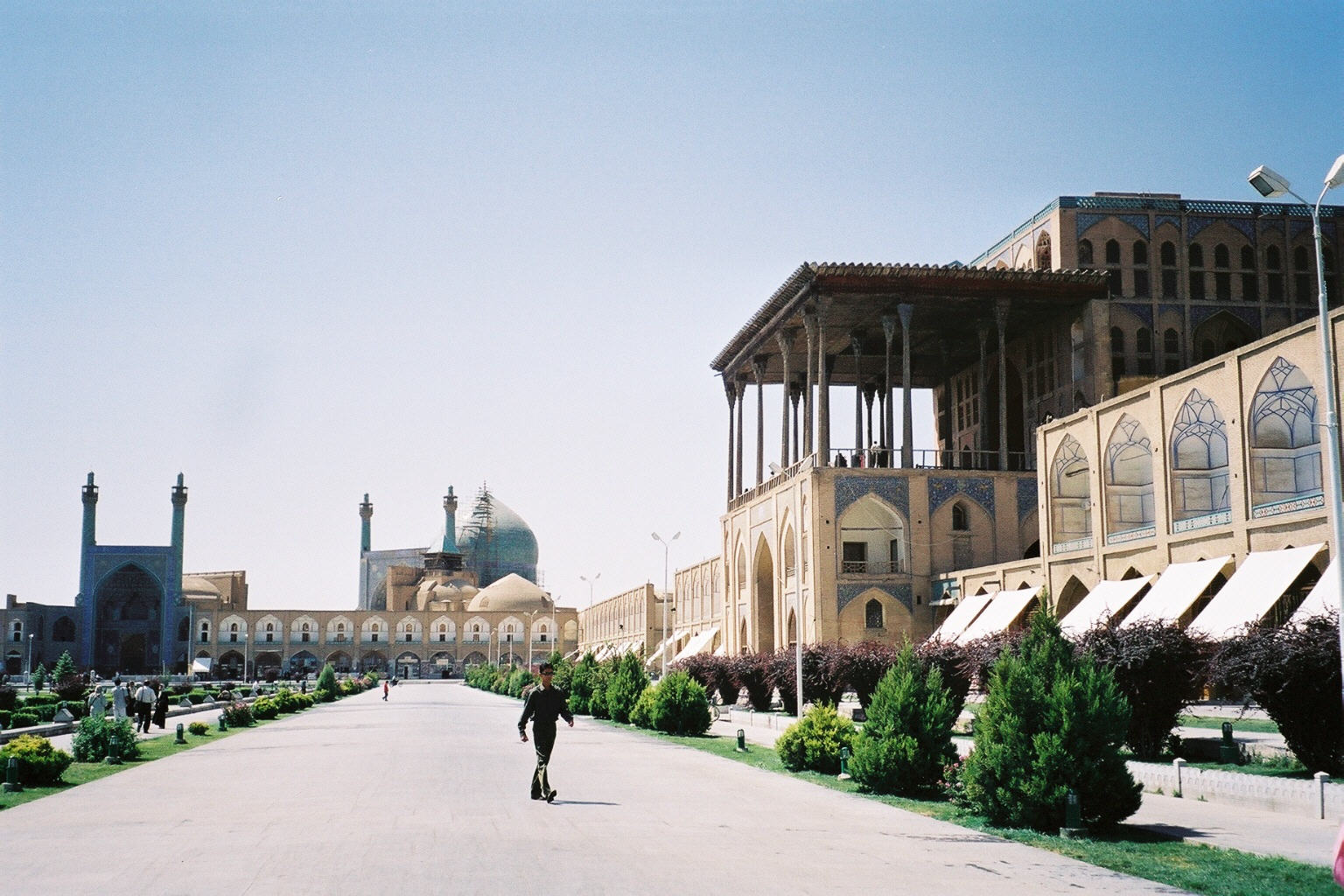
Another of the palace, with Shah Mosque in the back

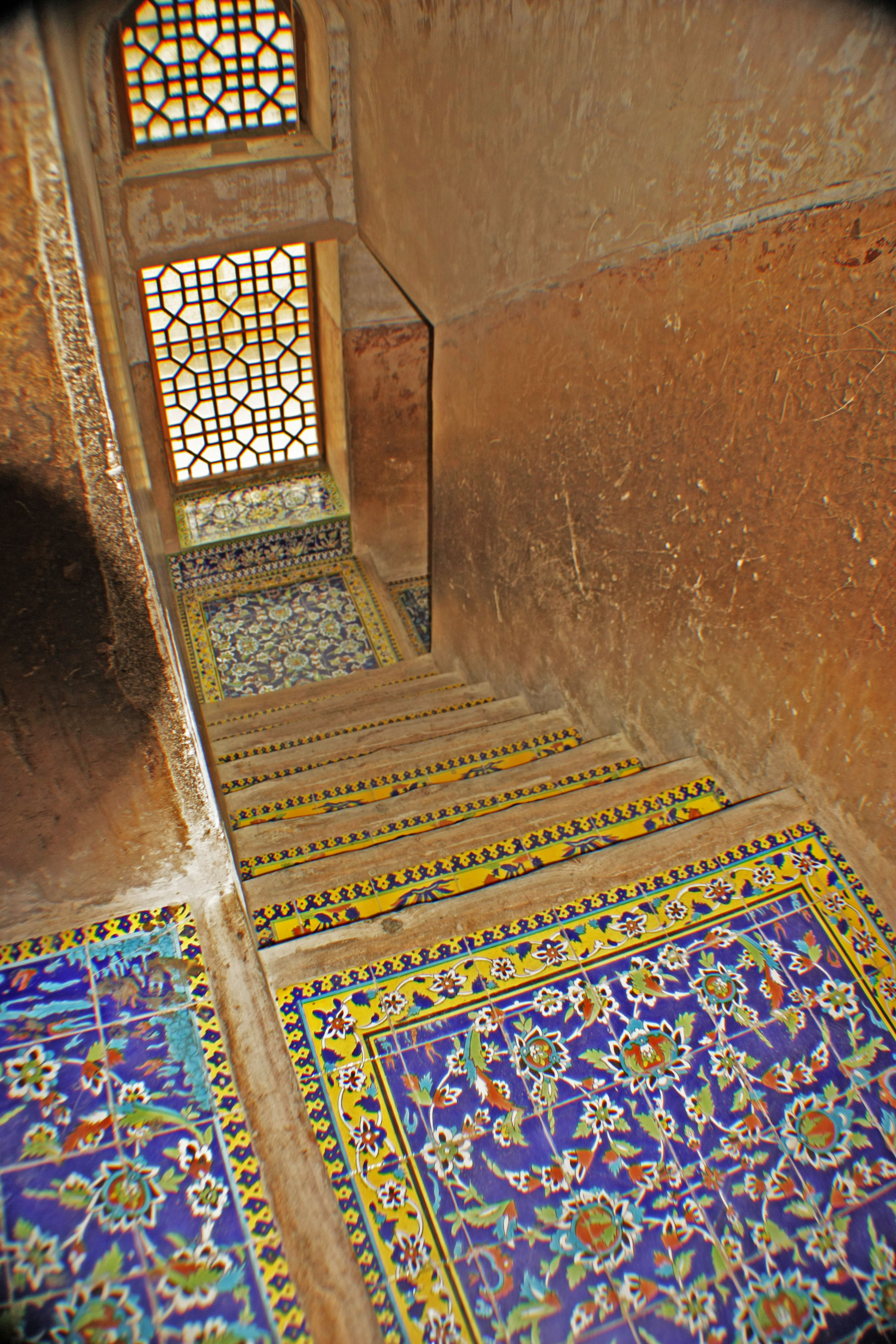
Staircases inside the palace

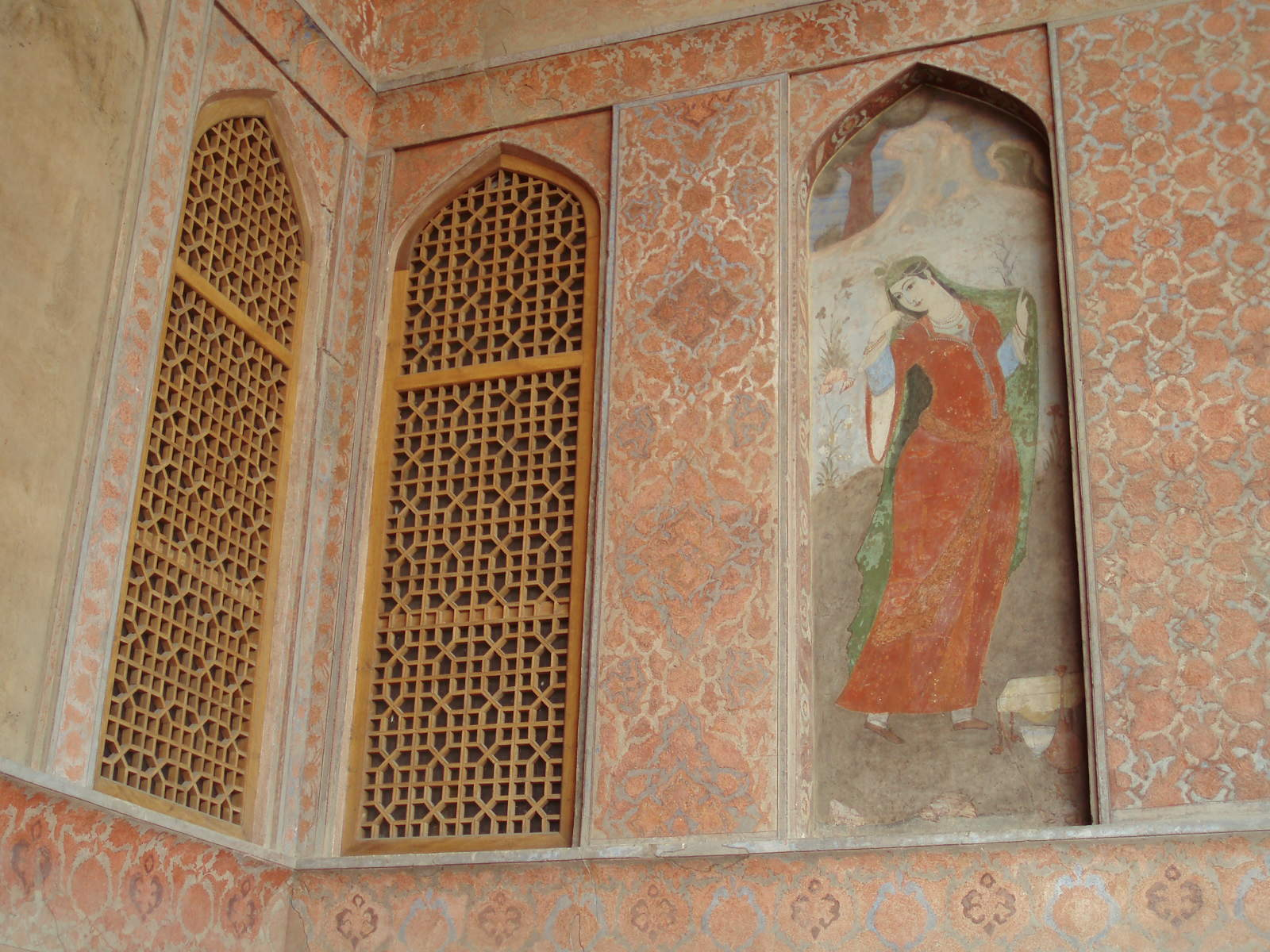
Painting of a Persian woman

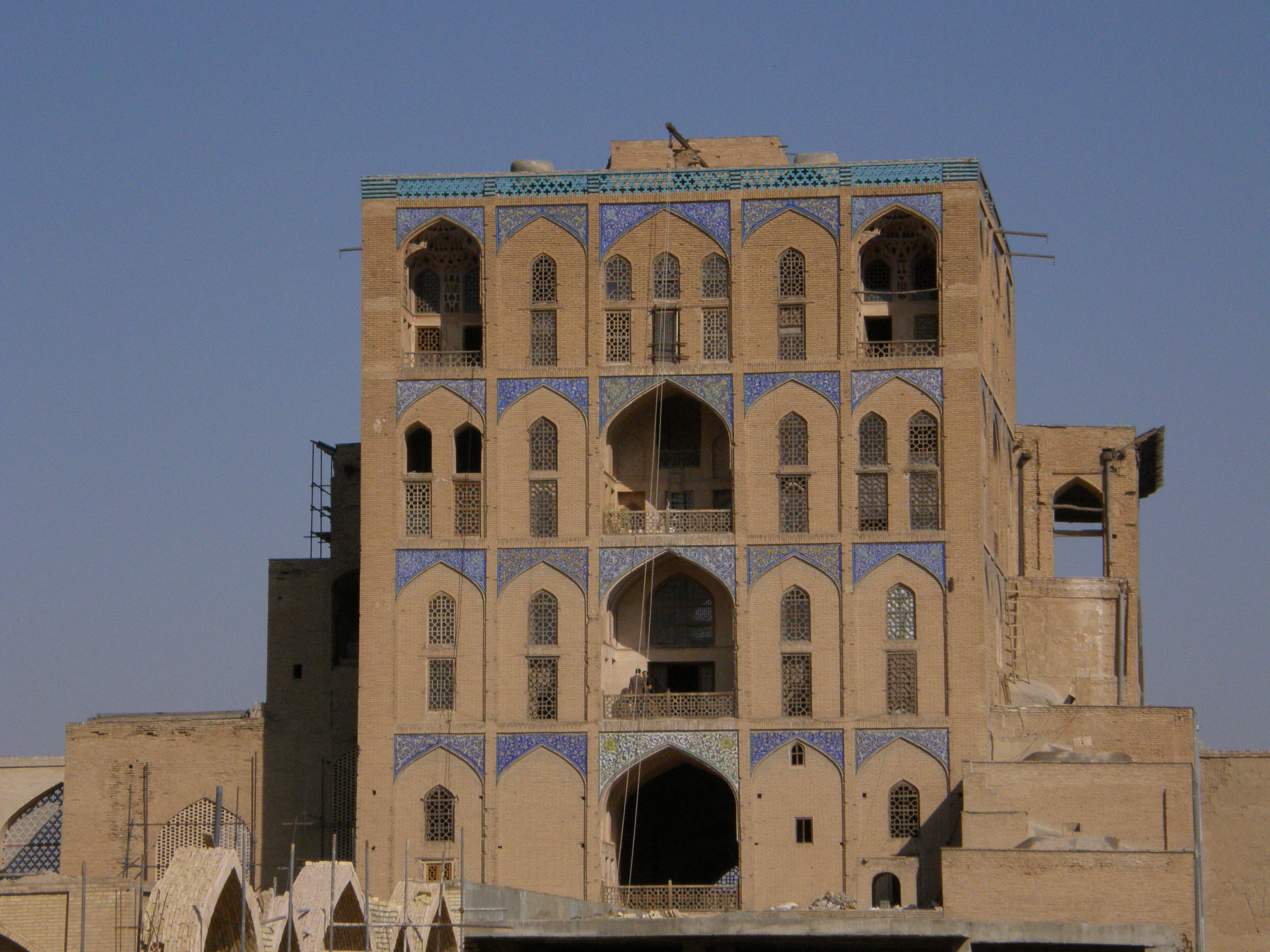
A view from behind

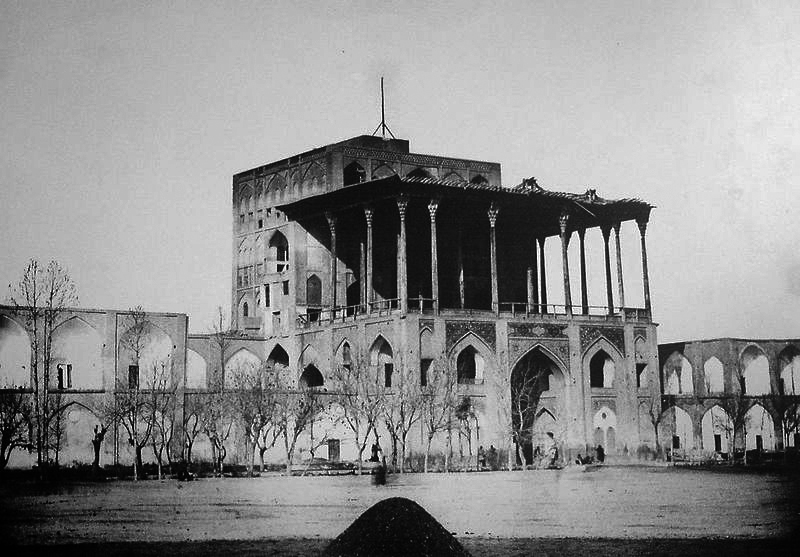
Ali Qapu in 1909, Photo by Ernst Hoeltzer

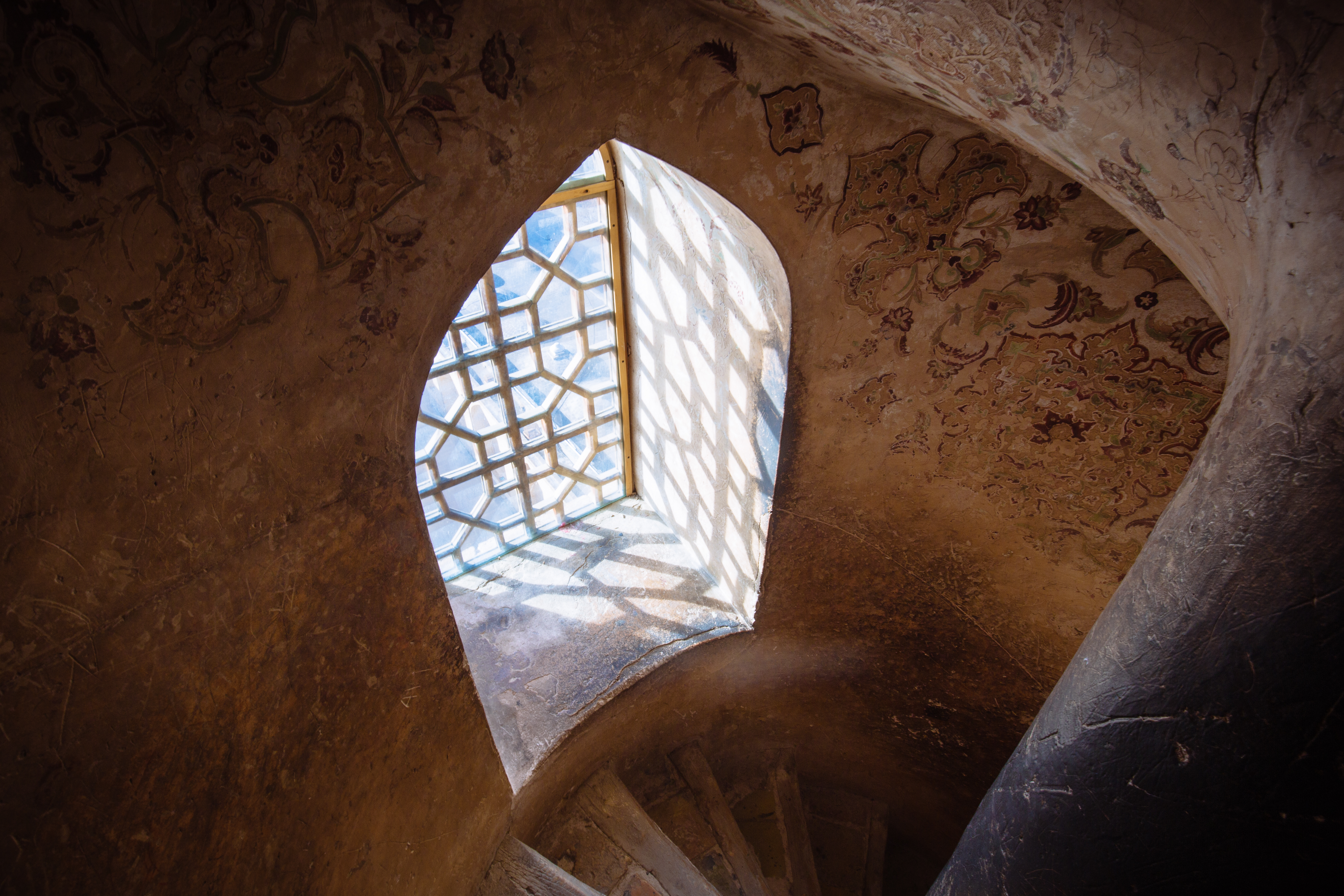
Wooden windows on one of the spiral staircases of Ali Qapu Palace

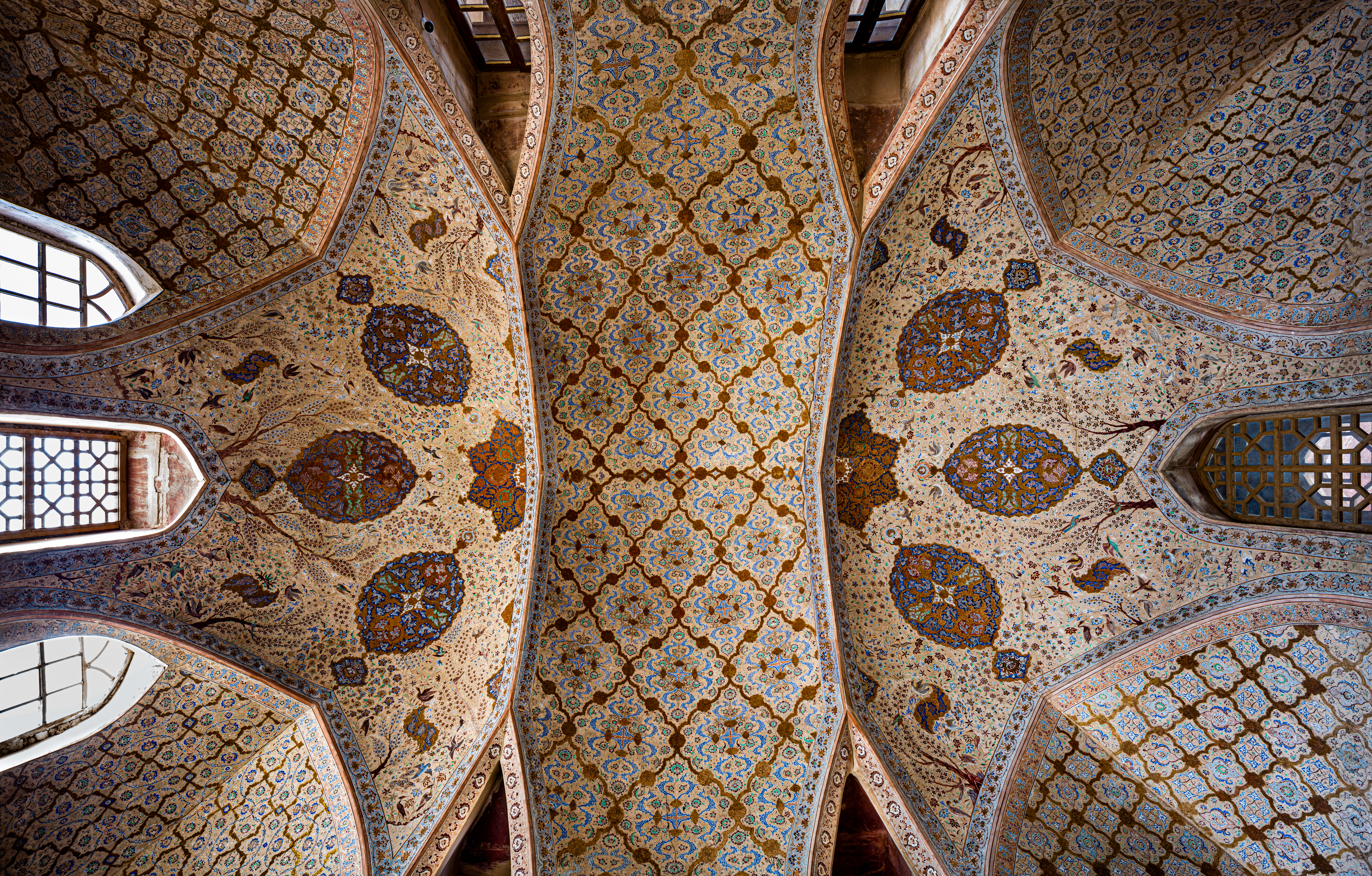
Ceiling in one of the halls

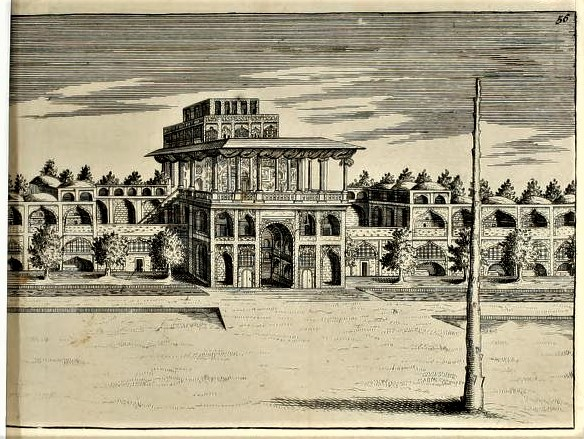
An etching taken by Nicolas Sanson, 17th century

== See also ==
- List of the historical structures in the Isfahan province
- Persian domes
- Ali Qapu Gate, Qazvin

== Bibliography ==
- M. Ferrante: ‘Dessins et observations préliminaires pour la restauration du palais de ‛Alī Qāpū’, Travaux de restauration de monuments historiques en Iran, ed. G. Zander (Rome, 1968), pp. 137–206
- E. Galdieri: Eṣfahān: ‛Alī Qāpū: An Architectural Survey (Rome, 1979)
- Babaie, Sussan. "Safavid Palaces at Isfahan: Continuity and Change (1590-1666)." Order No. 9422911, New York University, 1994.
