= August Rossbach =

German classical philologist and archaeologist (1823–1898)

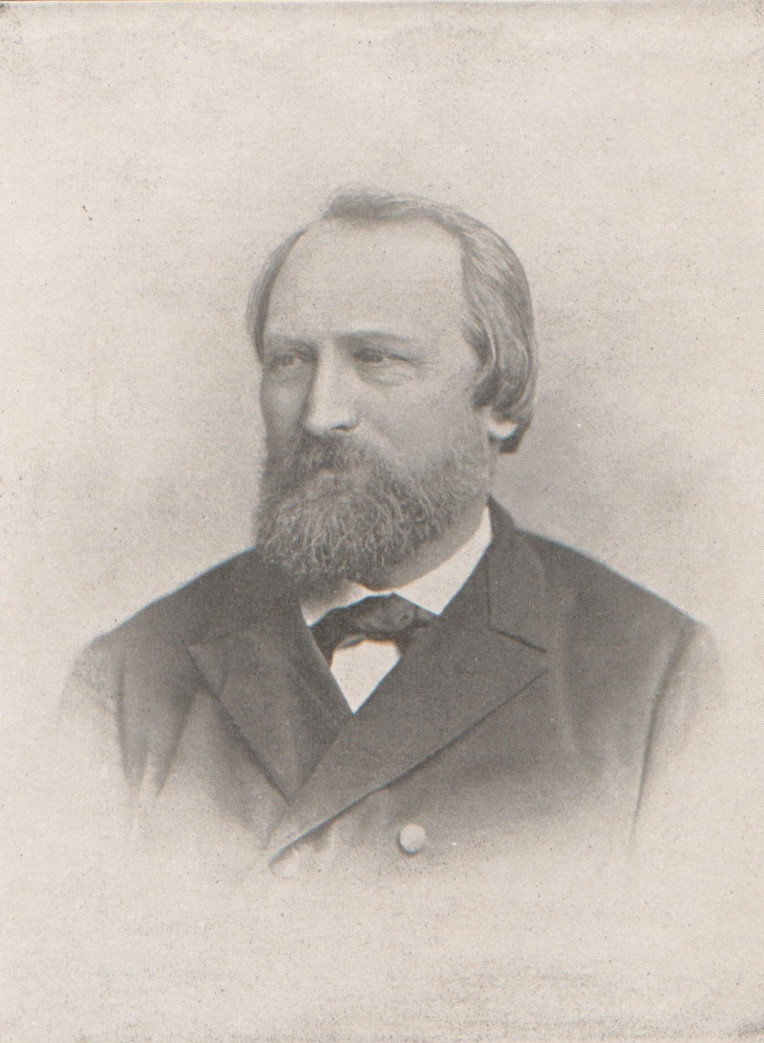
- Born: August 26, 1823
- Died: July 23, 1898 (aged 74)

Academic background
- Education: University of Marburg; Leipzig University

Academic work
- Discipline: Classical philology
- Institutions: University of Halle; Humboldt University of Berlin

August Rossbach (26 August 1823 – 23 July 1898) was a German classical philologist and archaeologist. He is known for his investigations of ancient Greek metrics, defined as a discipline that studies the patterns and arrangements of syllables and words that characterize Greek poetry.

Born in Schmalkalden, he received his education at the Universities of Leipzig and Marburg, receiving his habilitation in 1852. After becoming an associate professor at the University of Tübingen, he relocated to Breslau in 1856, where he was appointed a professor of philology and archaeology.

With Rudolf Westphal (1826–1892), he collaborated on Metrik der griechischen Dramatiker und Lyriker (Metrics of the Greek dramatist and poet, 1854) as well as Theorie der musischen Kunste der Hellene (Theory of Performing Arts of the Hellenes, published in 4 tomes 1885–1889). He was the author of writings on Catullus (1854; second edition 1860) and Tibullus (1854), and published a work on Roman marriage, "Römisches Hochzeits- und Ehedenkmäler (1871).
