= Springstille =

- Stadtteil of Schmalkalden
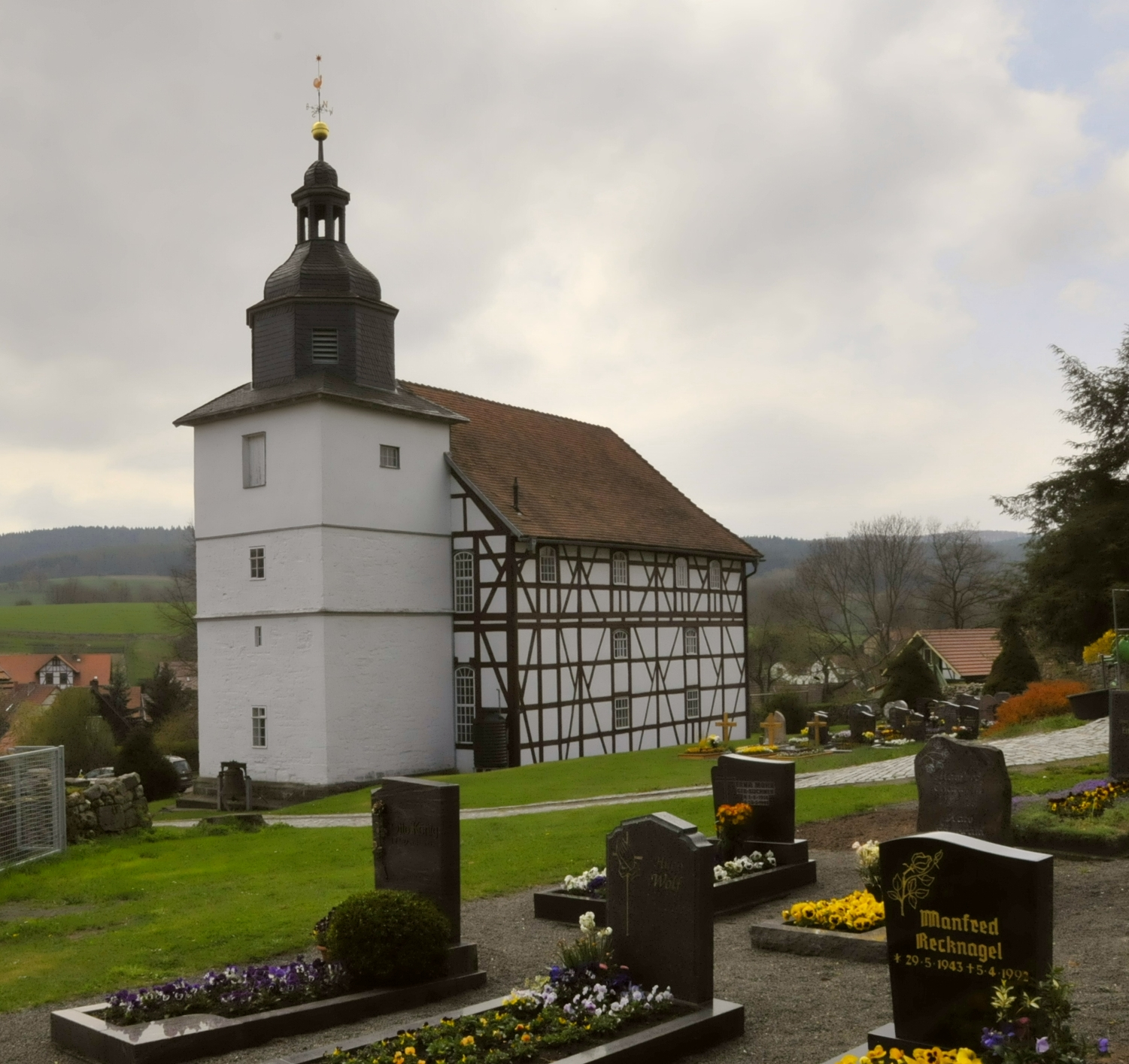

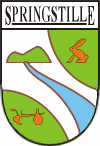
- Coat of arms
- Interactive map of Springstille
- Location within Germany Location within Thuringia
- Coordinates: 50°40′N 10°31′E
- Country: Germany
- State: Thuringia
- District: Schmalkalden-Meiningen
- Town: Schmalkalden

Area
  - Total: 7.08 km^{2} (2.73 sq mi)
- Elevation: 370 m (1,210 ft)

Population (2016-12-31)
  - Total: 558
  - Density: 78.8/km^{2} (204/sq mi)
- Time zone: UTC+01:00 (CET)
  - Summer (DST): UTC+02:00 (CEST)
- Postal codes: 98587
- Dialling codes: 036847
- Website: www.springstille.de

Springstille is a village and a former municipality in the district Schmalkalden-Meiningen, in Thuringia, Germany. Since July 2018, it is part of the town Schmalkalden.

== History ==
From 1868 to 1944, Springstille was part of the Prussian Province of Hesse-Nassau.
