= Schmalkalde =

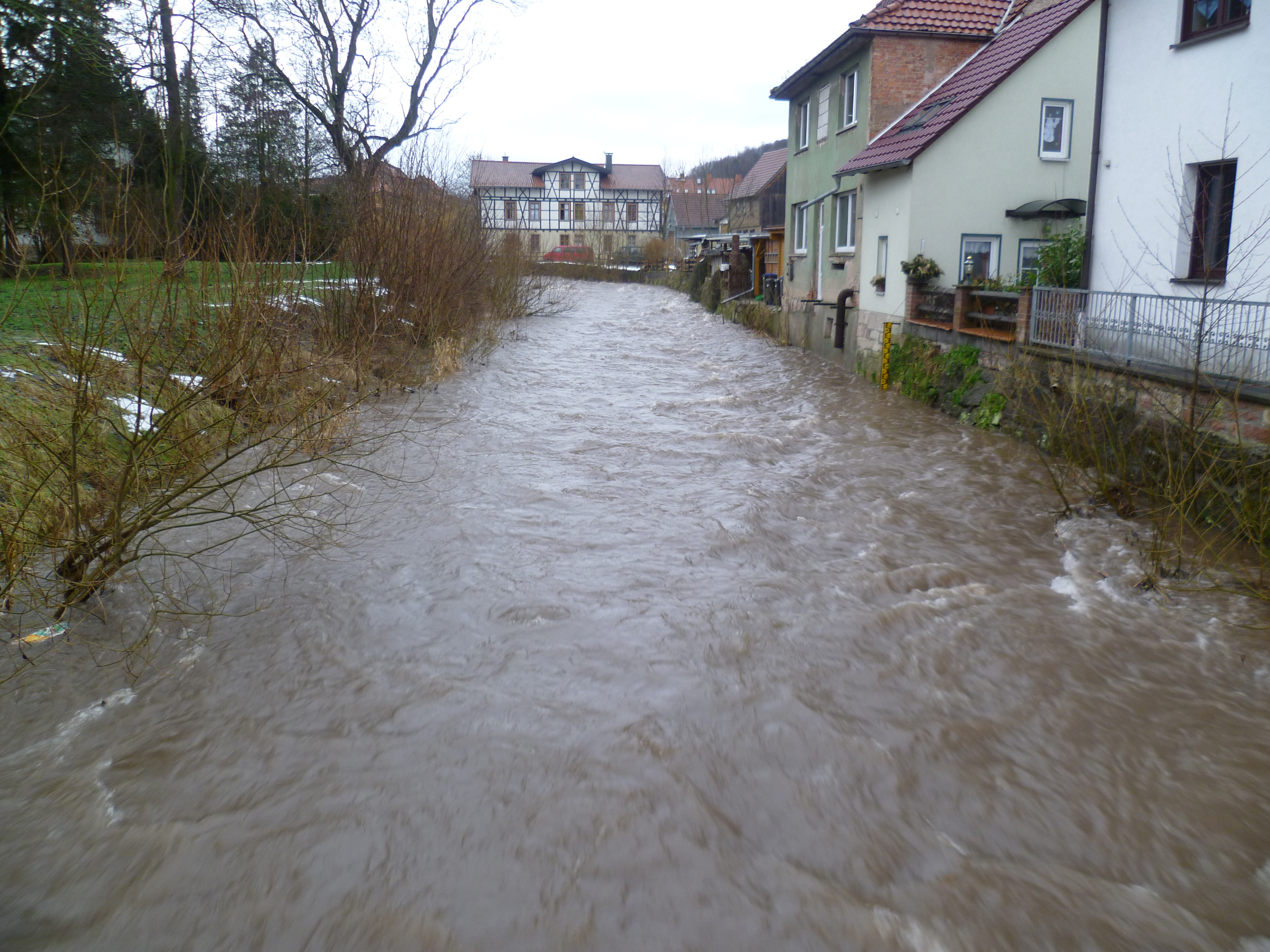

Location
- Country: Germany
- States: Thuringia

Physical characteristics
- Mouth
  - location: Werra
  - coordinates: 50.7155°N 10.3583°E

Basin features
- Progression: Werra→ Weser→ North Sea

Schmalkalde (German pronunciation: [ʃmalˈkaldə]) is a river of Thuringia, Germany. It flows through the town Schmalkalden, and joins the Werra near Wernshausen.

== See also ==
- List of rivers of Thuringia
