= Schmalkalden =

- Town
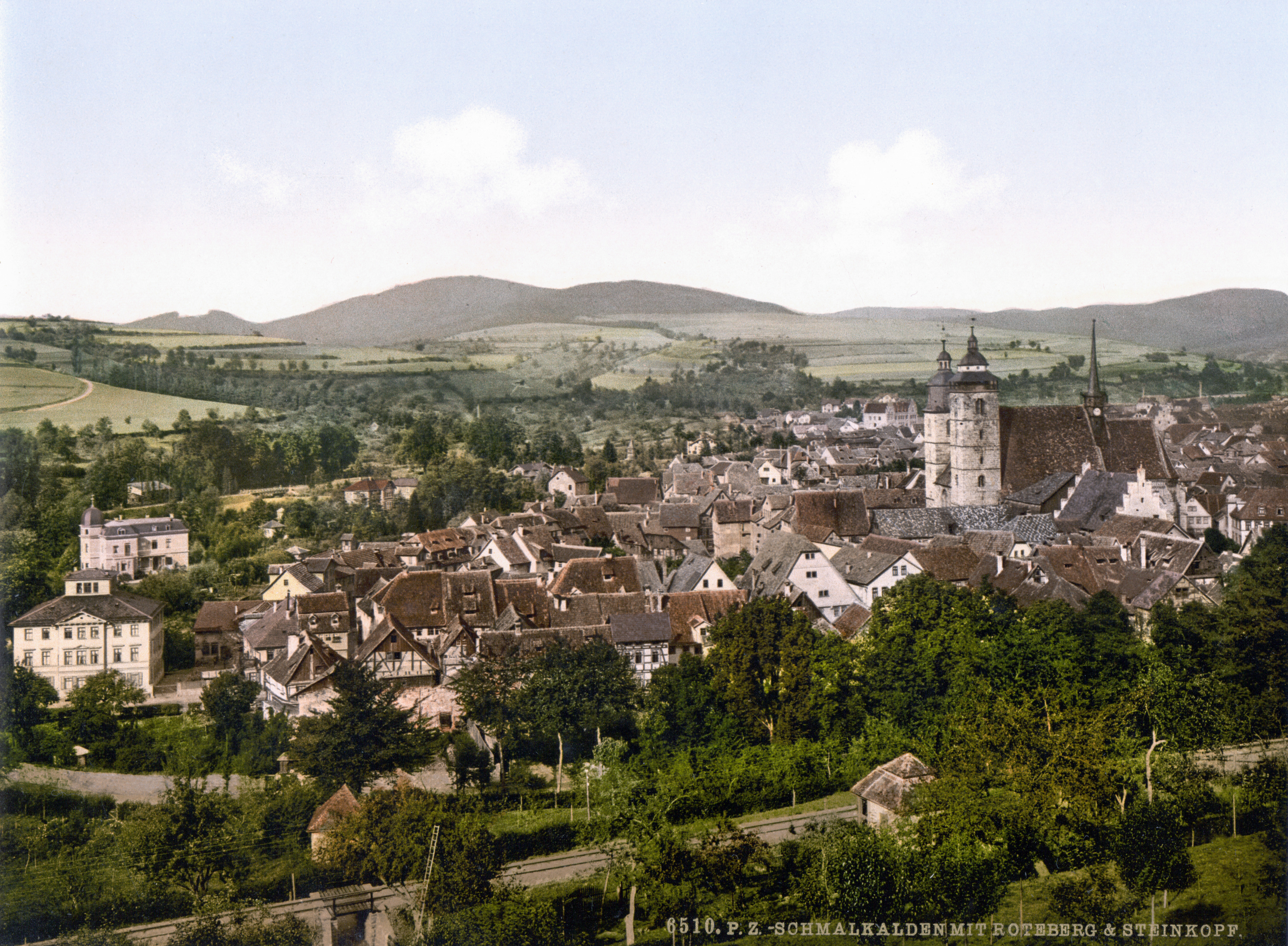
- Schmalkalden about 1900

- Coat of arms

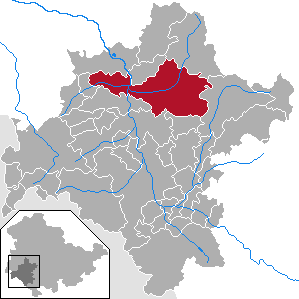
- Location of Schmalkalden within Schmalkalden-Meiningen district
- Interactive map of Schmalkalden
- Location within Germany Location within Thuringia
- Coordinates: 50°43′N 10°27′E
- Country: Germany
- State: Thuringia
- District: Schmalkalden-Meiningen

Government
  - Mayor (2024–30): Thomas Kaminski (SPD)

Area
  - Total: 105.38 km^{2} (40.69 sq mi)
- Elevation: 295 m (968 ft)

Population (2025-12-31)
  - Total: 19,323
  - Density: 183.36/km^{2} (474.91/sq mi)
- Time zone: UTC+01:00 (CET)
  - Summer (DST): UTC+02:00 (CEST)
- Postal codes: 98574
- Dialling codes: 03683
- Vehicle registration: SM
- Website: www.schmalkalden.de

Schmalkalden (German pronunciation: [ʃmalˈkaldn̩]) is a town in the Schmalkalden-Meiningen district, in the southwest of the state of Thuringia, Germany. It is on the southern slope of the Thuringian Forest at the Schmalkalde river, a tributary to the Werra. As of 31 December 2022, the town had a population of 20,065.

== History ==
First mentioned in an 874 deed, Smalcalta in the Frankish duchy of Thuringia received town privileges about 1180. When Landgrave Henry Raspe of Thuringia died without issue in 1247, it passed to the House of Henneberg-Schleusingen, while the major part of the landgraviate fell to the House of Wettin in Meissen. To secure their acquisition the Counts of Henneberg allied with the Landgraviate of Hesse, including the conclusion of an inheritance treaty. In 1360, together with Landgrave Henry II of Hesse they paid off Frederick V, Burgrave of Nuremberg, son of Elisabeth of Henneberg.

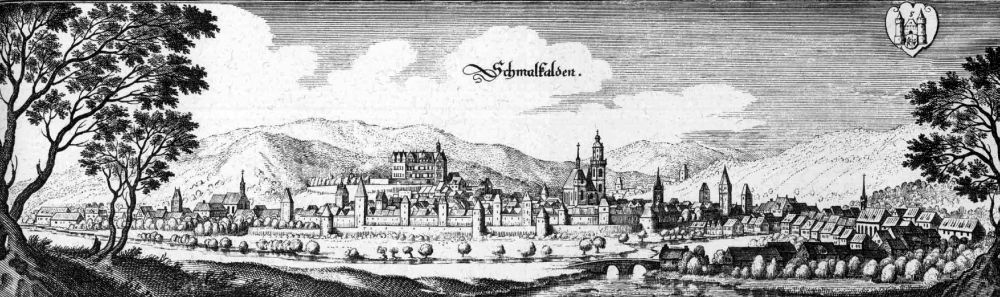
Schmalkalden, Matthäus Merian, Topographia Hassiae, engraving, 1655

In 1531 the town hall of Schmalkalden was the site of the establishment of the Schmalkaldic League by Protestant princes under the lead of Landgrave Philip I of Hesse, in order to protect religious and political interests within their domains. In 1537 the Smalcald Articles were drawn up by Martin Luther, Philipp Melanchthon and other reformers.

When the Counts of Henneberg became extinct in 1583, their share was inherited by William IV, Landgrave of Hesse-Kassel. William made the town a residence and had Wilhelmsburg Castle erected, finished in 1590. The Lordship of Schmalkalden remained an exclave of Hesse, from 1868 on it was part of the Prussian province of Hesse-Nassau until it was incorporated into the Province of Saxony in 1944 and in 1945 became part of the State of Thuringia.

The town sustained heavy bomb damage in World War II. From 1949 on, with Thuringia, it formed part of East Germany. After reunification it attained its present political configuration. In July 2018 the former municipality of Springstille was merged into Schmalkalden.

== Notable people ==
Date	Name	
1638–1707	Christoph Cellarius	Scholar
1758–1827	Christian Karl August Ludwig von Massenbach	Colonel
1815–1873	Karl Wilhelm	Choral director
1823–1898	August Rossbach	Philologist and archaeologist
1892–1966	Kurt Jahn	General
1903–1981	Otto H. Schade	Television pioneer
born 1941	Angela Steinmüller	Mathematician and author
1957–2021	Heiko Salzwedel	Cycling coach and team manager
born 1960	Kirsten Tackmann	Politician
born 1967	Frank Luck	Biathlete
born 1971	Sven Fischer	Biathlete
born 1974	Anja Knippel	Runner
born 1975	Steffi Jacob	Skeleton racer
born 1976	Kati Wilhelm	Biathlete
born 1978	Alexander Wolf	Biathlete
born 1990	Christin Ulrich	Weightlifter

== International relations ==
Schmalkalden is twinned with:

- Fontaine, Isère, France
- Recklinghausen, Germany
