= Bahman Mirza =

Iranian Qajar prince (1810–1884)

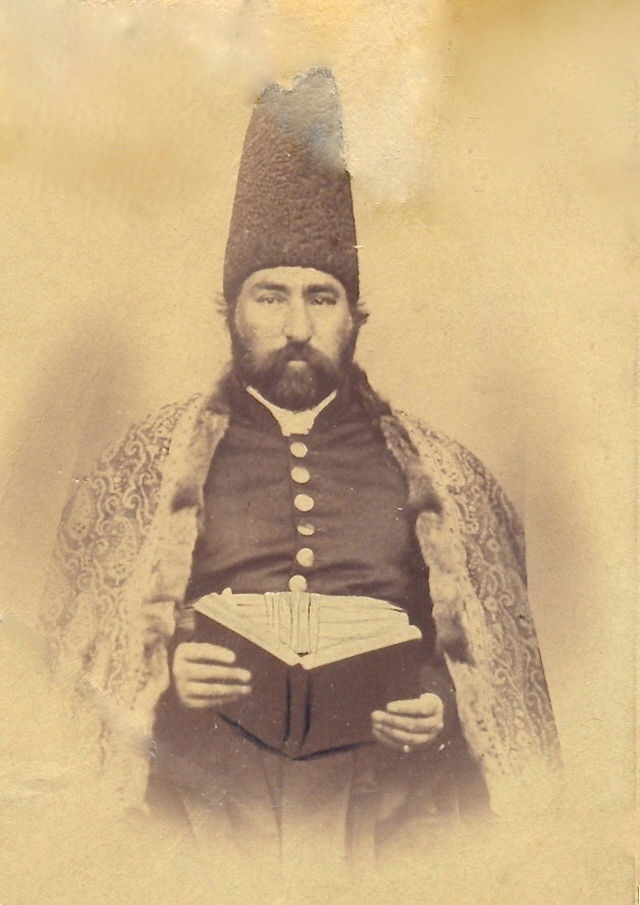
- Portrait of Bahman Mirza taken in Karabakh, dated 1862
- Born: 1810; Iran
- Died: 1883/84 (aged 73–74); Shusha, Russian Empire
- Dynasty: Qajar
- Father: Abbas Mirza
- Religion: Twelver Shia Islam
- Writing career
- Language: Persian
- Notable works: Tazkera-ye Mohammad Shahi

Bahman Mirza (Persian: بهمن میرزا, romanized: Bahman Mīrzā; 1810 – 1883/84) was a Qajar prince, literary scholar, and writer who lived in Iran and later the Russian Empire. The fourth son of the former crown prince Abbas Mirza, his career in Iran was marked by several governorships, including the province of Azerbaijan (1841–1847).

In 1845, riots and other disturbances started occurring in Iran as its unstable state and the illness of Bahman Mirza's full brother and sovereign Mohammad Shah Qajar (r. 1834–1848). In 1846, the Qajar Hasan Khan Salar started a rebellion in Khorasan. He and his father Asef al-Dowleh (Bahman Mirza's uncle) planned to capture the capital of Tehran and install Bahman Mirza on the throne. It is uncertain if Bahman Mirza was part of this scheme or not. He was ultimately granted sanctuary by Mohammad Shah in Tehran, but was treated in a hostile manner by him, and also continued to be worried by the schemes of the grand vizier Haji Mirza Aqasi.

Bahman Mirza thus fled to the Russian Empire in November 1847. He had been granted asylum there, since the Russians considered sheltering an Iranian prince as a crucial component of their foreign policy with Iran. He spent the rest of his life there, dying in 1883 or 1884. He was survived by over 100 children and grandchildren, with many of them serving in the Russian government and military.

Bahman Mirza was a patron of literature and a man of letters. He commissioned the first Persian translation of the Arabic Alf layla wa layla (One Thousand and One Nights), which was completed in 1835. With the encouragement of Mohammad Shah, he also composed the Tazkera-ye Mohammad Shahi in 1841, a Persian tazkera (anthology of poets). The tazkera is full of poetry, including 4,500 verses from Ferdowsi alone; however it is not very useful for biographical information.

== Biography ==
=== Life in Iran ===
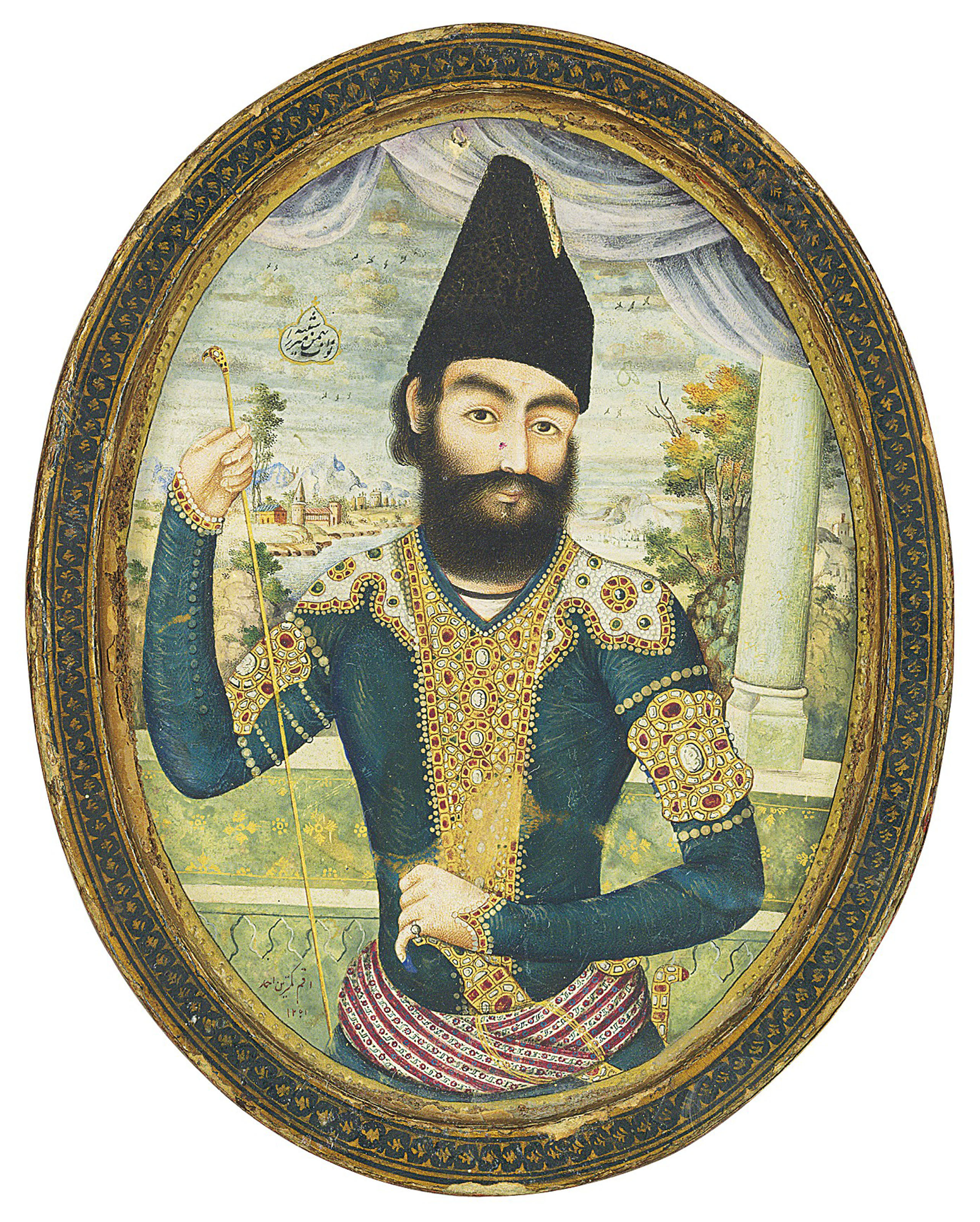
Portrait of Bahman Mirza. Made by Ahmad in 1835/36 in Tehran, Iran

Born in 1810, nothing is known about the early years of Bahman Mirza. A member of the ruling Qajar dynasty of Iran, he was the fourth son of the crown prince Abbas Mirza, and grandson of shah (king) Fath-Ali Shah Qajar (r. 1797–1834). Bahman Mirza's mother was a daughter of Mirza Mohammad Qajar Davalu Beglerbegi. She belonged to the Davalu, which along with the Qovanlu formed the dominant clans of the Qajar dynasty. Bahman Mirza had two full brothers, Qahraman Mirza and Mohammad Mirza (the later Mohammad Shah Qajar).

Bahman Mirza's first administrative position was seemingly as governor of the cities of Ardabil, Meshginshahr and Talesh from 1831 to 1834. On 21 December 1834, the newly crowned Mohammad Shah (r. 1834–1848) appointed him as the governor of the capital of Tehran. In 1835/36, Bahman Mirza briefly served as the governor of Borujerd and Silakhor, and in 1836/37, he was re-appointed as the governor of Tehran. In 1841, he succeeded the recently deceased Qahraman Mirza as the governor of Azerbaijan, and thus went to its provincial capital of Tabriz. At that time, Tabriz was the biggest city in Iran. Because of its European trade, its populations of Greek, Armenian, and European merchants, and its connections to the Ottoman and Russian empires, Tabriz maintained its lively cosmopolitan character.

In 1845, riots and other disturbances started occurring in Iran as its unstable state and the Mohammad Shah's illness. In 1846, the Qajar Hasan Khan Salar started a rebellion in Khorasan. Hasan Khan Salar and his father Asef al-Dowleh (Bahman Mirza's uncle) seemed to have planned that Hasan Khan Salar was to seize Khorasan, then amass a sizable army to capture Tehran and install Bahman Mirza on the throne. The grand vizier Haji Mirza Aqasi learned of this scheme and attempted to prevent it.

Bahman Mirza, who might have been aware of and involved in this scheme, discovered that Khosrow Khan Gorji had been sent to Kurdistan in order to put an end to a revolt led by Fath-Ali Shah's grandson Reza Qoli Khan Ardalan. When Bahman Mirza found out about Khosrow Khan's expedition, he became concerned that he may strike Azerbaijan. Bahman Mirza traveled to Tehran by a side road, well-knowing of Khosrow Khan's cruel reputation. Aqasi, who seemed doubtful about the aim of Bahman Mirza, gave Khosrow Khan the order to go to Zanjan in order to coerce Bahman Mirza into doing something reckless. When Bahman Mirza reached Tehran, he attempted to meet with Aqasi, who was in the Abbasabad fort. He refused to let Bahman Mirza in because as he considered him to be a conspirator.

Even though Bahman Mirza was ultimately granted sanctuary by Mohammad Shah, he was treated in a hostile manner by him, and also continued to be worried by Aqasi's schemes. As a result, in November 1847 while out riding, Bahman Mirza sought safety in the Russian embassy. There he requested asylum in Russia, which was granted by the Russian government, since they considered sheltering an Iranian prince as a crucial component of its foreign policy with Iran. A few days later, Bahman Mirza and his wives, children, secretaries, and servants departed Iran for the Russian city of Tiflis.

=== Life in the Russian Empire ===
The Russian government provided Bahman Mirza shelter and support, allocating 30,000 silver rubles as an annual stipend and another large sum under a different category each year. The contemporary Iranian historian Nader Mirza Qajar blames Aqasi for the accusation that Bahman Mirza conspired for throne, believing the latter to be innocent. He also claims that the descriptions by Reza-Qoli Khan Hedayat and Mohammad Taqi Sepehr of Bahman Mirza's ambitions were motivated by their desire to appease the shah.

The Russians saw Tehran's strong pro-British leanings evidenced by their decline of the request by the Russian emperor Nicholas I for Bahman Mirza to be returned to Iran. In retaliation, an Iranian delegation sent to the Russian capital Saint Petersburg to proclaim the ascension of Naser al-Din Shah Qajar was turned down by the Russian authorities. Nicholas I felt particularly upset at the Iranian premier Amir Kabir since the latter seemed to be "following the footsteps of his predecessor" in filling "the royal mind with the dislike . . . for his uncle [i.e., Bahman Mirza]." In reality, though, Nicholas I wanted to restore the pro-Russian Bahman Mirza as governor of Azerbaijan in order to balance out Amir Kabir's pro-British leanings.

Bahman Mirza had privately appealed to Naser al-Din Shah, citing his "former friendship" with him and declaring his willingness to serve him honorably. Amir Kabir came to the conclusion that permitting Bahman Mirza's return would necessitate doing the same for the Anglophile Asef al-Dowleh, who was at the time living in exile in Ottoman Iraq. In Azerbaijan and Khorasan, respectively, Bahman Mirza and Asef al-Dowleh were well-liked, and thus "the shah would be a mere puppet in their hands" argued Amir Kabir. The Iranian historian Abbas Amanat states that; "In Amir Kabir's argument there was a clear desire to stress the vitality of a powerful and centralized monarchy for Iran." Because of his mistrust and perception of Bahman Mirza as an adversary, Naser al-Din Shah included disparaging remarks about him in his memoirs.

After staying in Tiflis for three years, Bahman Mirza moved to another Russian city, Shusha in the Karabakh region. There he spent the rest of his life, dying in 1883 or 1884.

== Cultural activities ==
Bahman Mirza was a patron of literature and a man of letters; several works by writers and translators were dedicated to him. He always treated people with kindness and generosity, and he held academics, poets, and artists in high regard. When he lived in Tabriz, he asked Abd al-Latif Tasuji and Mirza Mohammad-Ali Khan Shams al-Sho'ara Sorush Esfahani to translate the Arabic Alf layla wa layla (One Thousand and One Nights) into Persian. Tasuji translated the stories into Persian prose, while Sorush, in his search for closest possible parallels to the original Arabic verse, searched through the poetry of classical Persian poets. In cases when he was unable to accomplish this, he would personally translate the Arabic verses into Persian. The translation was published in 1845, being the first Persian edition of the story and one of the first lithographic publications in Tabriz. Bahman Mirza also commissioned the English merchant Edward Burgess to write the geographical work of Joghrafiya-yi Alam ("Geography of the World"), which also included some historical histories of modern Europe. It was presented in 1846 to Mohammad Shah.

Bahman Mirza was an enthusiastic reader and bibliophile who had a large collection of books. He was encouraged by Mohammad Shah to write a Persian tazkera (anthology of poets). He started writing the tazkera in 1833, completing it in 1841. He named it Tazkera-ye Mohammad Shahi, after Mohammad Shah. In the introduction of his tazkera, Bahman Mirza expresses his intention behind it;

"Without assistance, utensils or poets' divans and in the absence of samples of poetry and prose writing, I wrote this anthology (tazkera) clearly, simply, and fluently, not using complicated poetic techniques or arcane bookish metaphors. Since, regarding the illustrious poets, namely Ferdowsi of Tus, Anvari, Sa'di, Nezami, Khvaja Hafez, Molla Rumi and others, their divans were available, and authors of tazkeras, such as Azar and others, provided an abridged version of their poetries, therefore, [writing a tazkera] was not a simple task. Nevertheless, I was determined to take pen in hand, and select verses of these poets in such a matter that [the verses] are closely tied with each other and the topics do not deviate from the interrelationship. Thus, without superfluity and redundancy, their verses are, in an appropriate fashion, recorded in this book with no connivance in the selection."

The tazkera is divided into three chapters: Chapter 1 is about 123 poets of the past; Chapter 2 is about the poetry of Fath-Ali Shah and the Qajar princes; and Chapter 3 is about 57 poets of Bahman Mirza's time. The tazerka is full of poetry, including 4,500 verses from Ferdowsi alone; however it is not very useful for biographical information. The work remains unpublished, with many of its manuscripts being kept in different libraries.

== Family ==
Bahman Mirza was survived by over 100 children and grandchildren, with many of them serving in the Russian and later Azerbaijani government and military. The descendants of Bahman Mirza, the Bahmani family, bore the title of Prince of Persia (Russian: принц персидский) in the Russian empire. One of them was Darab Mirza Qajar, who during the Russian occupation of northern Iran in 1909 attempted to conquer Zanjan, but was defeated by the constitutionalist forces.

== Sources ==
- Amanat, Abbas (1997). Pivot of the Universe: Nasir Al-Din Shah Qajar and the Iranian Monarchy, 1831–1896. I.B.Tauris. ISBN 978-1845118280.
- Amanat, Abbas (1999). "Fatḥ-ʿAlī Shah Qājār". In Yarshater, Ehsan (ed.). Encyclopædia Iranica. Vol. IX/4: Fārs II–Fauna III. London and New York: Routledge & Kegan Paul. pp. 407–421. ISBN 978-0-933273-32-0.
- Calmard, Jean (2004). "Moḥammad Shah Qājār". In Yarshater, Ehsan (ed.). Encyclopædia Iranica (Online ed.). Encyclopædia Iranica Foundation.
- Nava'i, A. (1988). "Bahman Mīrzā". In Yarshater, Ehsan (ed.). Encyclopædia Iranica. Vol. III/5: Bahai Faith III–Baḵtīārī tribe II. London and New York: Routledge & Kegan Paul. pp. 490–491. ISBN 978-0-71009-117-8.
- Tahqiqi, Leila (2019). "بهمن میرزا". The Great Islamic Encyclopaedia (in Persian).
- Ter-Abe, Naofumi (2017). "The Politics of Poetics in Early Qajar Iran: Writing Royal-Commissioned Tazkeras at Fath-ʿAli Shāh's Court". Journal of Persianate Studies. 10 (2). Brill: 128–157. doi:10.1163/18747167-12341311.
