= Morad Mirza Hesam o-Saltaneh =

Qajar prince and official (1818–1883)

Morad Mirza
- Hesam o-Saltaneh
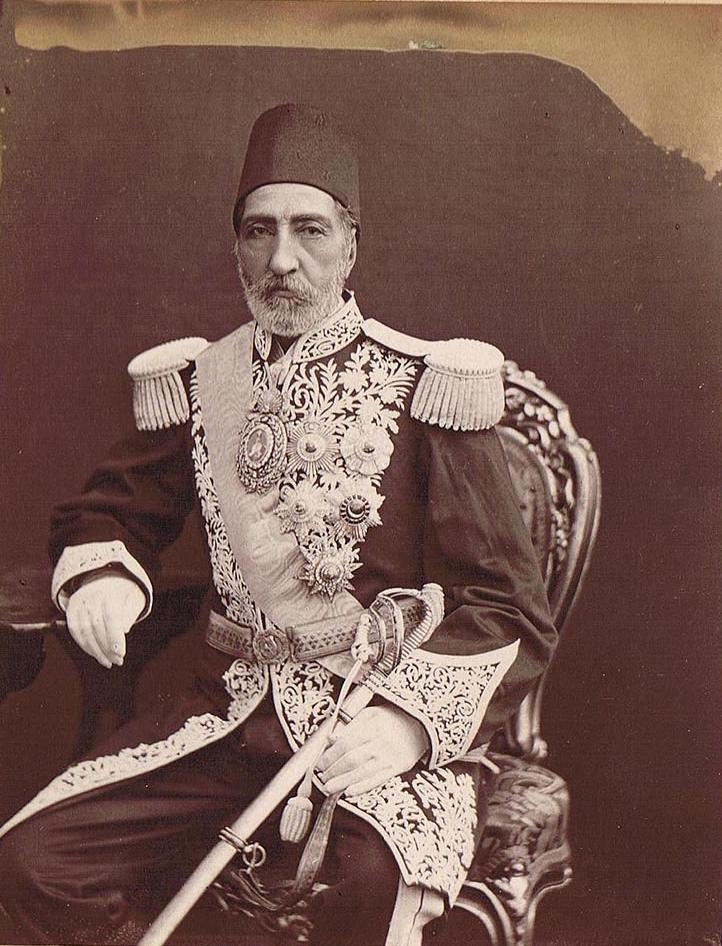
- Picture of Morad Mirza Hesam o-Saltaneh
- Born: 1818
- Died: 11 March 1883 (aged 67)
- Burial: Imam Reza Shrine, Mashhad
- Issue: Abol-Fath Mirza Moayed od-Dowleh
- Dynasty: Qajar
- Father: Abbas Mirza
- Religion: Twelver Shia Islam
- Military career
- Conflicts: Revolt of Hasan Khan Salar; Second Herat War

Morad Mirza Hesam o-Saltaneh (Persian: سلطان‌مراد میرزا حسام‌السلطنه; 1818 – 11 March 1883) was a Qajar prince, governor and military officer in 19th-century Iran. A son of the crown prince Abbas Mirza, Morad Mirza held various governorships throughout his career, including the Khorasan province five times. Morad Mirza is most notable as a commander of the Second Herat War (1856), sieging the Principality of Herat and re-establishing brief Persian control over Greater Khorasan.

He first appears in historical sources as the governor of Qaradagh during the last years of his father's life. In 1837, he was sent by his brother and suzerain, Mohammad Shah Qajar (r. 1834–1848), to suppress an uprising in the Bakhtiari region. Following the coronation of Naser al-Din Shah Qajar on 20 October 1848, Morad Mirza was assigned to suppress the Rebellion of Hasan Khan Salar in Khorasan, a power struggle within the Qajar family. Despite severe winter conditions that delayed his progress, he captured the provincial capital Mashhad in 1850, reasserting royal control after extended tribal resistance. Hasan Khan Salar and his allies were executed following the victory, and Morad Mirza was rewarded with the title "Hesam o-Saltaneh" ("Sword of the Kingdom") and the governorship of Khorasan.

Morad Mirza worked to increase Iranian influence and strengthen his alliances with the tribal leadership, establishing his authority in the towns of Sarakhs and Marv in 1852 and 1853, respectively. Herat, a frontier vassalage barely under Iranian control, became a focal point due to its contested status. When the Mohammadzai leader Sardar Kuhandil Khan marched towards Herat in the spring of 1852, the Iranian forces successfully made him retreat, and briefly controlled the citadel of Herat. Britain, which was anxious about possible encroaching Russian influence if Herat was fully incorporated into Iranian rule, forced Iran in January 1853 to accept terms that restricted its interference in Herat's internal affairs, including limiting Iranian military presence unless foreign forces attacked the area.

This agreement laid the groundwork for tensions that culminated in the Second Herat War in 1856. After overthrowing Sa'id Mohammad Khan on 15 September 1855, the Durrani prince Mohammad-Yusuf Mirza Durrani requested Iranian assistance against Kuhandil Khan's brother Dost Mohammad Khan, who had been acknowledged him as ruler of all of Afghanistan by the British partly to prevent Iranian plans for Herat. Fearing a lack of Iranian support, Mohammad-Yusuf Mirza subsequently defected to the British side. In April 1856, Morad Mirza laid siege to Herat with 30,000 troops. After months of resistance, including efforts by Morad Mirza to sow discord, Herat surrendered on 25 October 1856 due to supply shortages. Britain saw this as a violation of the 1853 agreement and declared war on Iran on 1 November 1856.

Burdened by an empty war treasury and the risk of political disaster, the Iranian government signed the Treaty of Paris on 4 March 1857, which ended the war and required Iran to leave Herat and abandon all claims to Afghanistan. After this, Morad Mirza continued to hold various administrative roles, including the governorship of the Fars province twice (1859–1861 and 1865–1868). Before he could assume his position as governor of Khorasan for the fifth time, he died and was buried in the Imam Reza Shrine.

== Biography ==
=== Background and early career ===
Khorasan and its surroundings in the early modern period

Born in 1818, Morad Mirza was a member of the ruling Qajar dynasty of Iran and the thirteenth son of Abbas Mirza, who served as crown prince until his death from illness in 1832. He first appears in sources as the governor of Qaradagh during the last years of his father's life. In 1837, his brother and suzerain Mohammad Shah Qajar (r. 1834–1848) sent him to suppress an uprising in the Bakhtiari region. After the coronation of Naser al-Din Shah Qajar on 20 October 1848, Morad Mirza was given an army of 7,000 troops and tasked with suppressing the Rebellion of Hasan Khan Salar in the Khorasan province, a power struggle by the Davalu clan of the Qajars.

He shortly marched from Tehran, but due to the extreme cold and snowstorm, was unable to achieve much. The survival of his troops depended entirely on the assistance of Sam Khan Ilkhani Zafaranlu, the leader of the Kurdish Zafaranlu tribe. When Hamzeh Mirza Heshmat od-Dowleh, the governor of Khorasan, was expelled from the provincial capital of Mashhad in the winter of 1848–1849, the governments rule over Khorasan reached its lowest point. Morad Mirza first started to advance gradually in the spring of 1849, in succession capturing the towns of Torshiz, Torbat-e Heydarieh, Joveyn, Sabzevar. On June 1849, he besieged Mashhad, where Hasan Khan Salar was based. Leading leaders from the Afshar, Hazara, and Turkmen communities supported Hasan Khan Salar in the early phases of the siege. An Iranian regiment, sent to assist Morad Mirza and led by Hasan Ali Khan Garrusi, also participated in the siege.

The populace of Mashhad was so supportive of Hasan Khan Salar that even the beggars armed themselves with knives to protect the city. However, he became an unpopular figure by October 1849 due to melting down gold and silver valuables from the Imam Reza Shrine worth 22,000 toman to refill his funds. Early in 1850, Morad Mirza was informed of the complaints in Mashhad about its high food prices. Several of Hasan Khan Salar's tribal allies, including Karimdad Khan Hazara, Abbasqoli Khan Darragazi, and Uraz Khan Toqtamish Sarakhsi, let Morad Mirza's army enter Mashhad on 23 March 1850.

Hasan Khan Salar was denied shelter in the Imam Reza Shrine due to his previous harsh treatment toward several powerful clergy members, and thus surrendered to Morad Mirza. He was executed on 29 April 1850, along with his brother Mohammad Ali Khan Qajar Davalu and son Amir Aslan. On May 21, 1850, another brother, Mirza Mohammad Khan Beglerbegi, who had been captured during Morad Mirza's capture of Sabzevar, was executed in Tehran.

=== First term as governor of Khorasan ===
==== Tribal alliances ====
With Mashhad once again under royal control, Morad Mirza held the governorship of Khorasan. Due to his victory, Morad Mirza was rewarded with the title of "Hesam o-Saltaneh" ("the Sword of the Kingdom") as well as a sword and badge by Naser al-Din Shah. During his first term as governor of Khorasan, Morad Mirza worked to increase Iranian influence in Herat and along the northern border. Morad Mirza's selection of allies strengthened the tribal leadership of the Khorasani places of Quchan, Dargaz and Bojnord. Sam Khan Ilkhani, who had shown himself to be a loyal supporter of the Iranian government throughout Hasan Khan Salar's rebellion, played a crucial part in the expedition against the Turkmens in 1851, the interference in Herat in 1852, the protection of Sarakhs against the Khanate of Khiva in 1854, and the Second Herat War. Given that his father Reza Qoli Khan Zafaranlu had been a fervent opponent of the Iranian government in the late 1820s, Sam Khan Ilkhani's ascent to power was an unexpected development. Other notable tribal allies included; Abbasqoli Khan Darragazi, who would serve as the governor of the town Sarakhs and later the town of Marv; and Jafarqoli Khan Shadillu, a former ally of Hasan Khan Salar who was installed as the governor of the towns of Jajarm, Nardin and Astarabad in 1854.

==== Interference in Herat ====
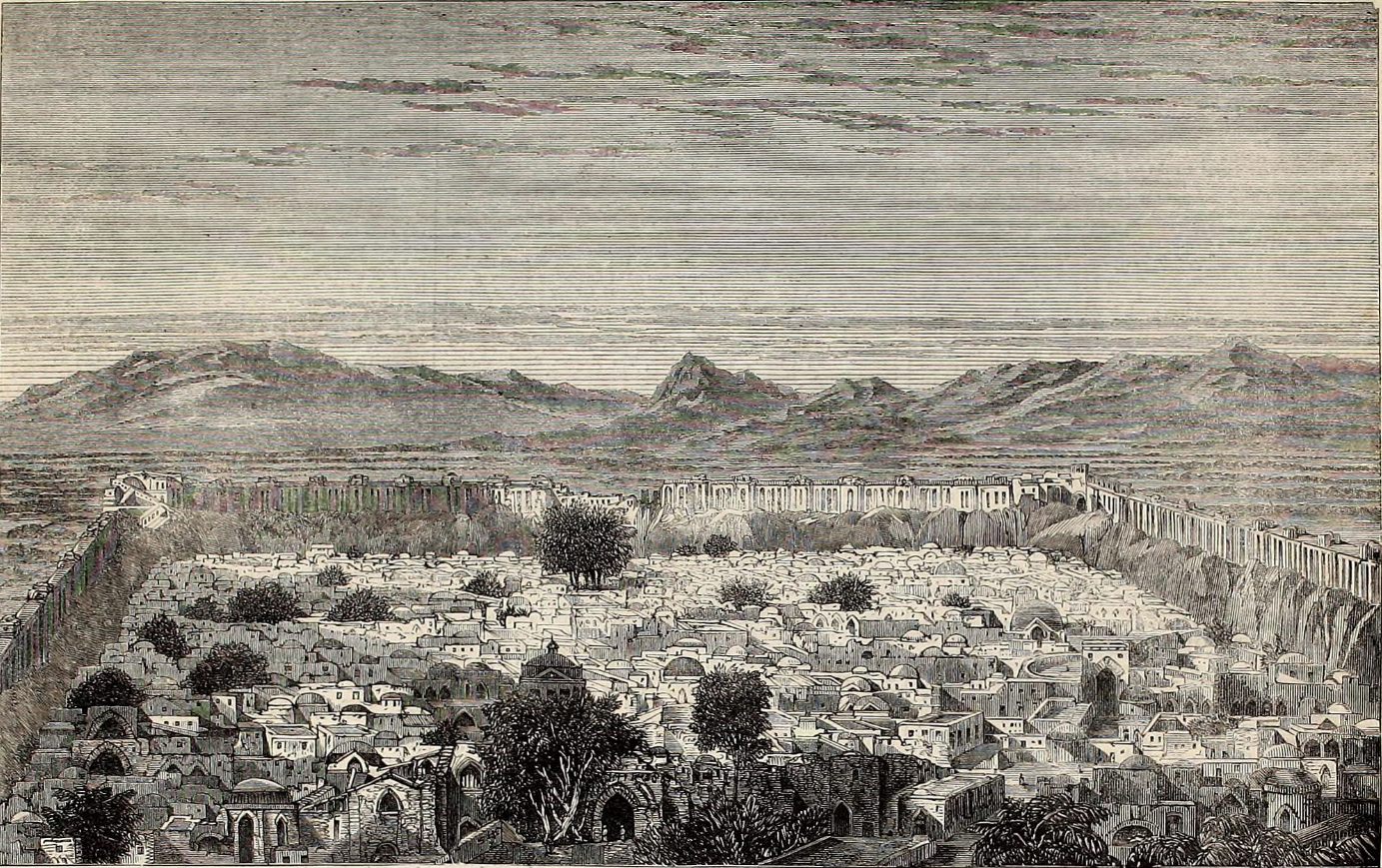
View of Herat from its citadel by The Illustrated London News, dated 1863

Herat was the first place that caught Morad Mirza's attention. Being a frontier vassalage barely under Iranian control, it was seen by the Qajar dynasty as an integral part of the Guarded Domains of Iran. Due to widespread anti-Iranian tensions in Herat and Britain's increasing engagement in Afghanistan, Iran's rule over Herat was under heavy threat. The British East India Company advocated for Herat's autonomy as a buffer state between northwestern India, Russia and Iran, even though they had previously supported Iranian rule over the city. Uncertainty over Herat's status as an Iranian tributary influenced many developments in the early 19th century. Opportunities for interference arose with the death of its ruler, Yar Muhammad Khan Alakozai, and the ascension of his son, Sa'id Mohammad Khan, in June 1851.

Unlike his father, Sa'id Mohammad Khan could not keep the loyalty of the local leadership in check. Sardar Kuhandil Khan, the Mohammadzai leader of the city of Kandahar, put pressure on him with his military. In March 1852, he conquered the towns of Farah and Esfezar and advanced to the boundaries of Herat. The Iranian government reacted by sending two different armies, led by Sam Khan Ilkhani and Abbasqoli Khan Darragazi. Kuhandil Khan abandoned his plans for Herat and retreated to Kandahar when Iranian forces reached Herat. The citadel of Herat was then held by Sam Khan Ilkhani until the third week of May 1852, when it was returned to Sa'id Mohammad Khan. However, for an additional three months, the Iranian troops remained in the area around Herat.

The British minister plenipotentiary in Tehran, Justin Sheil, was angry at the Iranian victory in Herat and called for a quick Iranian evacuation. His action began a new phase of the dispute over Herat between Britain and Iran, which ultimately resulted in Second Herat War in 1856. The potential of a Russian consulate in Herat if Iran established a permanent foothold there increased British concerns. In January 1853, Britain pressured the Iranian prime minister Mirza Aqa Khan Nuri to agree to a one-sided agreement. Under the terms of the Sheil-Nuri agreement, Iranian troops could only enter Herat if foreign forces attacked and had to withdraw immediately after the attackers retreated. Iranian interference in Herat's internal affairs was also prohibited, apart from the existing influence over Sa'id Mohammad Khan. Claims to being mentioned on coin engravings, Friday prayers, or other symbols of Herat's allegiance to Iran were renounced. This agreement was mandatory as long as Britain refrained from involving themselves in the internal affairs of Herat and its outposts.

When Sa'id Mohammad Khan became aware of the Sheil-Nuri agreement, he quickly aligned himself with the British, prompting the Iranian government to endorse Mohammad-Yusuf Mirza, a rival claimant to the leadership of Herat and member of the Durrani dynasty.

==== Submission of Sarakhs and Marv ====
The regions on the edge of Iranian control saw repeated interventions by the Khiva Khanate from the early 19th-century, particularly during the Herat conflicts of 1818 and 1837–1838. An open confrontation with the Khiva Khanate emerged between 1851 and 1854, as the governors of Khorasan resumed their territorial claims to Sarakhs and Marv. Morad Mirza briefly subjugated Sarakhs in June 1851, but he was unable to establish direct rule there due to resistance by the Khiva Khanate. A scheme by the Khivan representative Mir Ahmad Khan Jamshidi forced Abbasqoli Khan Darragazi to leave Sarakhs shortly after being appointed as its governor. Nevertheless, the Khivan presence was not adequate for the tribal leadership in Sarakhs to reject Iranian claims to the town. In late summer 1852, as Morad Mirza prepared another military expedition against Sarakhs, its tribal chieftain Uraz Khan Teke led sixty Turkmen nobles to Mashhad, where they pledged to send fifty elders as hostages, provide fifty soldiers for Morad Mirza's forces, and position one hundred guards on the frontiers of Khorasan. In 1853, Morad Mirza briefly established Iranian rule in Marv. In May 1853, Morad Mirza was removed as the governor of Khorasan and summoned back to Tehran. Before he went to Tehran, he had Marv reinforced with more soldiers. He also sent the Lion and Sun flag to the city, thus emphasizing the Iranian territorial claims to it.

=== Second term as governor of Khorasan ===
==== The Second Herat War ====
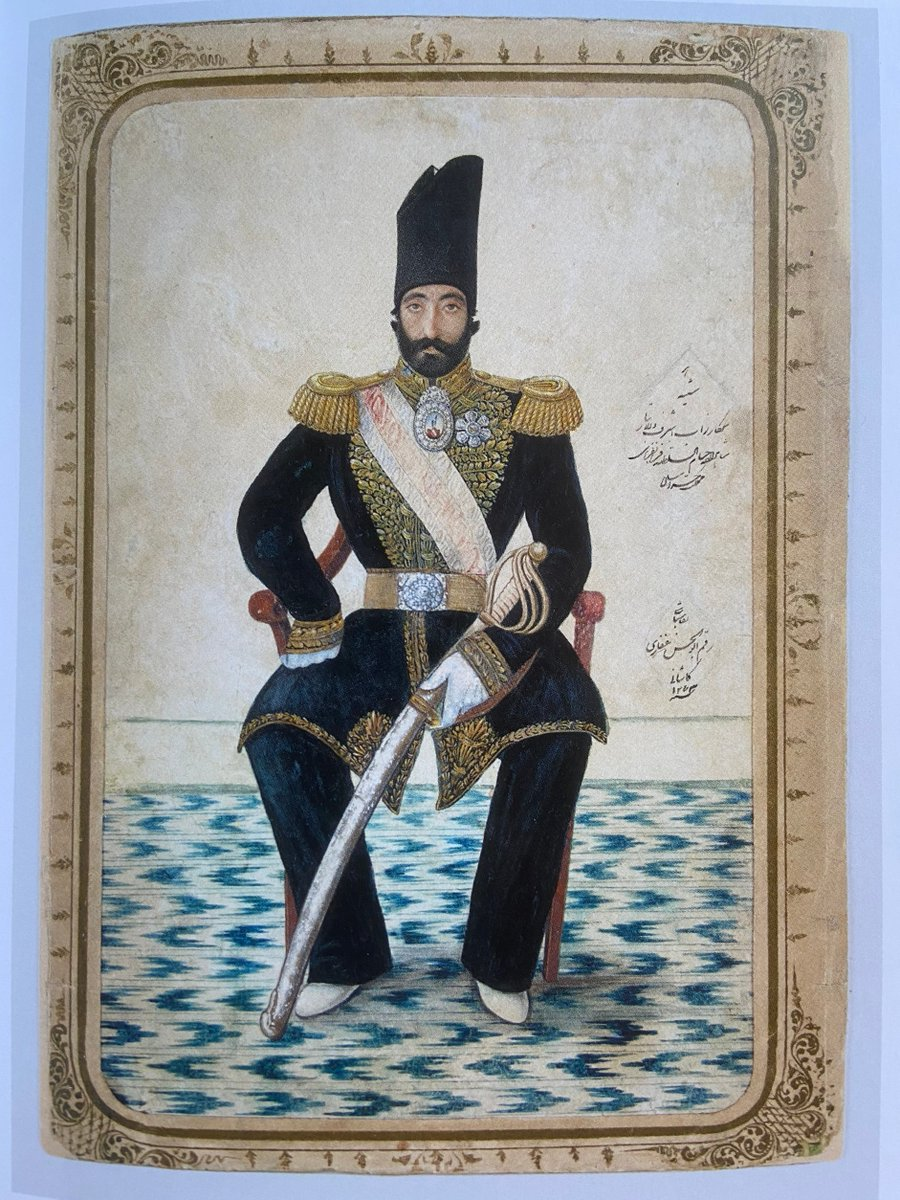
Portrait of Morad Mirza by Abu'l-Hasan Sani al-Mulk, dated 1856 or 1857

On 15 September 1855, without requesting Iranian approval or assistance, Mohammad-Yusuf Mirza overthrew Sa'id Mohammad Khan and made himself the new ruler of Herat. Around the same time, in southern and western Afghanistan, the power of the Mohammadzai was increasing. Kuhandil Khan had recently died, and thus his brother Dost Mohammad Khan—who had ruled Kabul since 1842— captured Kandahar and installed his own governor at Farah in November 1855. Before this, Dost Mohammad Khan had on 18 March 1855 signed the Treaty of Peshawar with Britain, which acknowledged him as ruler of all of Afghanistan. Part of the purpose of this deal was to prevent Iranian plans for Herat. Now fully supported by the British, Dost Mohammad Khan announced his plan to march on Herat under the guise of wanting to avenge Sa'id Mohammad Khan, who was his son-in-law.

On 11 December 1855, Mohammad-Yusuf Mirza's request for help reached the Iranian government. According to the Iranologist Christine Noelle-Karimi; "The swift reaction of the Iranian government... suggests the possibility that preparations for a move against Herat had already been under way." The newspapers in Tehran reported on the deployment of Iranian troops to Herat on 20 December 1855. It was during the winter of 1855–1856 that Morad Mirza was re-appointed as the governor of Khorasan. An army under Sam Khan Ilkhani was sent in advance to Herat in February 1856, but it was quickly ousted by the Afghan authorities, who also almost succeeded in overthrowing Mohammad-Yusuf Mirza. Mohammad-Yusuf Mirza subsequently defected to the British side due to lacking confidence in the Iranian government. On 29 March 1856, Morad Mirza captured Ghuriyan, and quickly afterwards Farah, Esfezar and Karukh.

At the start of April 1856, Morad Mirza besieged Herat with 30,000 troops. In an attempt to make the siege easier, he tried to create division among the factions in Herat. However, this made the situation even more difficult. Morad Mirza made a deal with Mohammad-Yusuf Mirza's vizier Isa Khan Bardurrani to betray him, while simultaneously being in peace talks with Mohammad-Yusuf Mirza. On 28 April 1856, Morad Mirza received Mohammad-Yusuf Mirza through the efforts of Isa Khan. However, the latter showed no willingness to give up control of Herat and who expected autonomy as part of the agreement, leading to Morad Mirza to increase the pressure on the city. Isa Khan sought assistance from the British and Russians due to feeling deceived by the Iranian government, but failed. Naser al-Din Shah and his courtiers were worried by the siege's duration. During the fifth month of the siege, Morad Mirza received a letter from Nuri, reprimanding him for the prolonged siege. On 25 October 1856, Isa Khan surrendered the city due to a shortage of supplies. Morad Mirza's boldness and the siege techniques of the French army engineer M. Buhler played a key role in the capture of Herat.

Portraying this as Iran's most significant victory since the reign of Agha Mohammad Khan Qajar (r. 1789–1797), Naser al-Din Shah and Nuri made every effort to generate the loudest public noise. The court chronicler Mohammad Taqi Sepehr read the commemoration written and sent by Morad Mirza at the public ceremony for the event: "This is that stage in the remote desert; Where the armies of Salm and Tur were lost. I built trenches and was hit by boulders. I fought battles and employed devices. I blocked the city gates with repeated sorties and massive artillery. I positioned the victorious army around the city walls." Morad Mirza's commemoration went on to say that the mention of Naser al-Din Shah's name in the Friday prayer was the highest point of his accomplishment. A public holiday was proclaimed, and a "national booklet" describing the conquest was also created.

Arguing that Iran's occupation of Herat violated the 1853 Sheil-Nuri agreement, Britain declared war on 1 November 1856. In December 1856, the Iranian city of Bushehr was invaded by a large contingent of British and Indian troops. In February 1857, they defeated the Iranian army at the Battle of Khushab. Naser al-Din Shah and Nuri ordered their diplomat Farrokh Khan to accept the extreme British demands for peace and the ultimate restoration of diplomatic relations, as they were burdened by an empty war treasury and the risk of political disaster. Farrokh Khan signed the Treaty of Paris on 4 March 1857. This put an end to the war, forcing the Iranian army to leave Herat, relinquish all claims to Afghanistan and acknowledge their independence. In return, the British government pledged to use its power to mediate disputes between Afghanistan and Iran. The British strategic interests in Afghanistan, was an early consequence of the Great Game (the competition for control of Central Asia between the British and Russian Empires). It ultimately brought an end to Qajar hopes to preserve Herat as a frontier vassalage, after more than fifty years of engagement. Three and a half centuries of nearly continuous, although frequently chaotic, inclusion of Herat as part of Iran came to an end with the Treaty of Paris. Only at Nuri's demand did Morad Mirza unwillingly leave Herat.

The Hazara population in the Iranian-ruled part of Khorasan increased after the Second Herat War. In 1857, 5,000 Hazaras from Qala e Naw led by Karimdad Khan Hazara's relative Yusuf Khan Hazara were settled in Torbat-e Jam and Bakharz by Morad Mirza. In the same year, seeking to reinforce the eastern border of Khorasan, Morad Mirza also settled 2,000 Jamshidi families in the Sarjam district, southeast of Mashhad. Facing constant raids by the Turkmens, many relocated to Herat, with others relocating to Kana Gusha and Qara Buqa near Mashhad. By the time the famine of 1870–1872 was over, only 150 Jamshidi families remained. In 1858, Morad Mirza was dismissed as the governor of Khorasan and summoned back to Tehran.

=== Later career and death ===
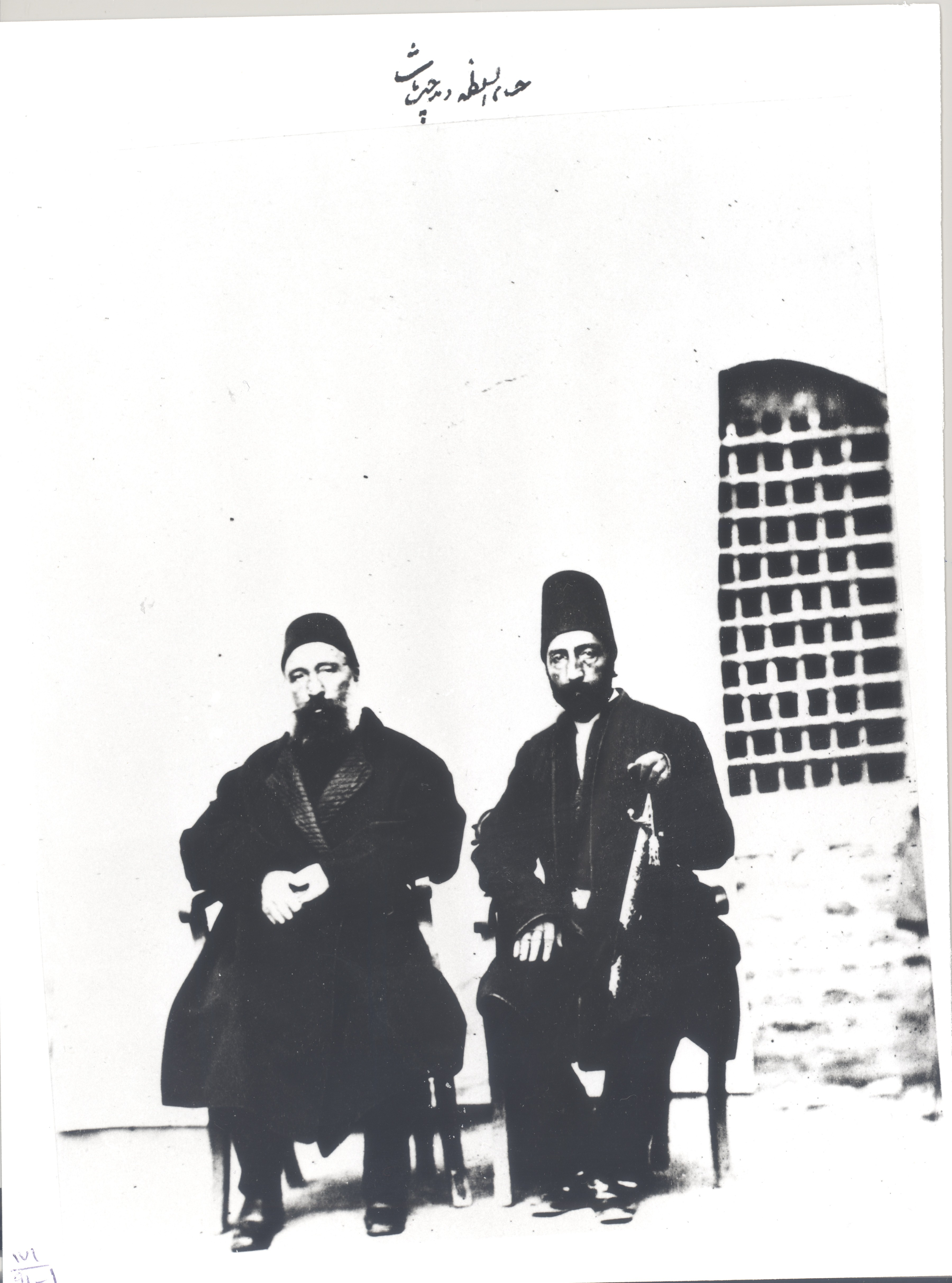
Morad Mirza (right) with the Ottoman statesman Midhat Pasha (left), ca. 1870

On 21 March 1859, Morad Mirza was appointed as the governor of the Fars province, thus succeeding Tahmasp Mirza Moayed od-Dowleh. During his term, Morad Mirza appointed Hossein-Qoli Nezam al-Saltaneh Mafi as his pishkar (private secretary/steward), which the latter would serve as until 1870. Morad Mirza held the governorship of Fars until 1861, when Tahmasp Mirza Moayed od-Dowleh was restored to the office. In April 1861, Morad Mirza was appointed as the governor of Khorasan for the third time. With his minister Mohammad Naser Khan Zahir od-Dowleh leading the military, Morad Mirza worked to manage the Turkmen threat and stabilize the region, as he had in the 1850s. The Zafaranlu tribe of Quchan continued to play an important role in fending off the Turkmen attacks, especially Sam Khan Ilkhani's half brother Amir Hossein Khan Ilkhani. In November 1863, Morad Mirza was again dismissed and summoned back to Tehran. From 1865 to 1868, Morad Mirza served as the governor of Fars for a second time. In 1870, he was given the governorship of the town of Yazd, but instead sent his son Abol-Fath Mirza Moayed od-Dowleh to manage it.

While still having the governorship of Yazd, Morad Mirza was re-appointed as the governor of Khorasan on 23 March 1871, during which he was engaged in frequent conflicts with the Turkmens. In the same year, he was dismissed as the governor of Yazd, instead being given the governorship of the city of Isfahan, which he again sent Abol-Fath Mirza Moayed od-Dowleh to manage. Morad Mirza was dismissed as the governor of Khorasan on 10 March 1872 because he openly criticized and clashed with the prime minister Mirza Hosein Khan Sepahsalar. Hossein Khan Shahsevan was appointed in his stead. In 1873, Morad Mirza was part of Naser al-Din Shah's retinue during his first trip to Europe. In 1876/77, he was given the governorship of the Kurdistan and Kerman provinces, and again sent Abol-Fath Mirza Moayed od-Dowleh to manage them in his stead. In 1881, Morad Mirza travelled to the Ottoman capital of Constantinople to ask for assistance against the rebellion of Sheikh Ubeydullah, a leader of the Kurdish branch of the Sufi order Naqshbandi. The Ottoman envoy Suleiman Pasha traveled to Iran with Morad Mirza and brought a friendly letter to improve ties between the two nations.

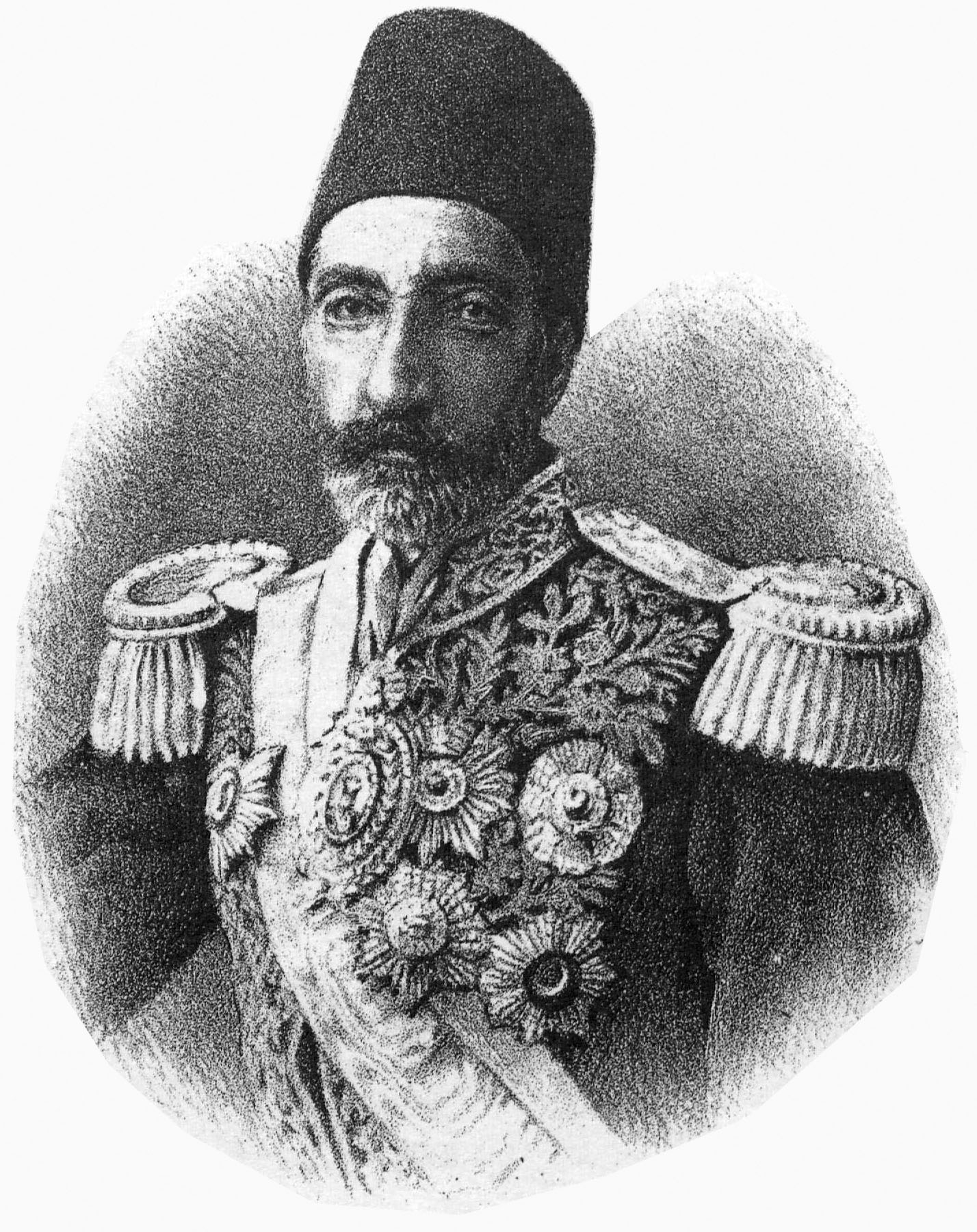
Portrait of Morad Mirza by Abu Torab Ghaffari, dated June 1882

In February/March 1882, Morad Mirza was appointed as the governor of Khorasan for the fifth time, but died on 11 March 1883 before he could assume the position. He was 67 years old at the time of his death, and was buried in the Imam Reza Shrine.

== Legacy and assessment ==
Morad Mirza has been praised by poets such as Malek Kalam Majdi and Monem Shirazi. At the request of Morad Mirza, the philosopher, theologian and poet Hadi Sabzavari composed the Sharh-e abyat-e moshkela-ye Masnavi, an important analysis of the challenging passages of the Masnavi by the medieval Persian poet Rumi. The Iranologist Abbas Amanat describes Morad Mirza as a "cultivated yet rambunctious prince, he was known for his Qajar pride and outspoken anti-British sentiments."

== Sources ==
- Amanat, Abbas (1989). "Amīr Neẓām Garrūsī". In Yarshater, Ehsan (ed.). Encyclopædia Iranica (Online ed.). Encyclopædia Iranica Foundation. ISBN 978-0710090959.
- Amanat, Abbas (1997). Pivot of the Universe: Nasir Al-Din Shah Qajar and the Iranian Monarchy, 1831–1896. I.B. Tauris. ISBN 978-1845118280.
- Amanat, Abbas (2003). "Herat vi. The Herat question". In Yarshater, Ehsan (ed.). Encyclopædia Iranica (Online ed.). Encyclopædia Iranica Foundation. ISBN 978-0710090959.
- Ashraf, Ahmad (1999). "Fārs iv. History in the Qajar and Pahlavi Periods". In Yarshater, Ehsan (ed.). Encyclopædia Iranica (Online ed.). Encyclopædia Iranica Foundation. ISBN 978-0710090959.
- Beigi, Maryam Arjah (2014). "Hamzeh Mirza Heshmat od-Dowleh". Encyclopaedia of the World of Islam (in Persian). Vol. 14. Encyclopaedia Islamica Foundation. ISBN 9789644470127.
- Bosworth, Clifford Edmund (2007). Historic Cities of the Islamic World. Brill. ISBN 978-9004153882.
- Busse, H. (1982). "ʿAbbās Mīrzā Qajar". In Yarshater, Ehsan (ed.). Encyclopædia Iranica (Online ed.). Encyclopædia Iranica Foundation. ISBN 978-0710090959.
- Ettehadieh, Mansoureh (2020). "Neẓām-al-Salṭana, Ḥosaynqoli Khan". In Yarshater, Ehsan (ed.). Encyclopædia Iranica (Online ed.). Encyclopædia Iranica Foundation. ISBN 978-0710090959.
- Ghaffari, Fariba (2014). "Hesam o-Saltaneh". Encyclopaedia of the World of Islam (in Persian). Vol. 13. Encyclopaedia Islamica Foundation. ISBN 9789644470127.
- Nasr, Seyyed Hossein (2002). "Hādi Sabzavāri". In Yarshater, Ehsan (ed.). Encyclopædia Iranica (Online ed.). Encyclopædia Iranica Foundation. ISBN 978-0710090959.
- Noelle-Karimi, Christine (2014). The Pearl in its Midst: Herat and the Mapping of Khurasan (15th-19th Centuries). Austrian Academy of Sciences. ISBN 978-3700172024.
