= Galin Khanum (mother of Mohammad Shah Qajar) =

Queen mother of Mohammad Shah Qajar

Galin Khanum گلین خانم
- Mahd-e 'Oliā
- Died: 23 June 1857
- Burial: Fatima Masumeh Shrine, Qom
- Spouse: Abbas Mirza
- Issue: Mohammad Shah Qajar; Bahman Mirza; Qahraman Mirza; Begum Khanum
- House: Devellu, Qajar tribe
- Dynasty: Qajar
- Father: Mohammad Khan Qajar Devellu

Galin Khanum (Persian: گلین خانم; died 23 June 1857) was the consort of Abbas Mirza, the crown prince of Fath-Ali Shah, and the mother of Mohammad Shah Qajar. She was the third woman during the Qajar era to hold the title "Mahd-e Olia" (Queen Mother). Galin Khanum is remembered as one of the prominent and influential women of the Qajar dynasty.

== Background and family ==
Galin Khanum was the daughter of Mohammad Khan Qajar Devellu and the sister of Allahyar Khan Asef al-Dowleh, one of the key political figures of the Qajar era. Her sister, Gohar Khanum, was also one of Fath-Ali Shah's wives.Galin Khanum married Abbas Mirza in 1217 AH (1802 CE) in a strategic marriage aimed at resolving the longstanding rivalry between the powerful Dolu and Qovanlu branches of the Qajar family, a marriage encouraged by Agha Mohammad Khan Qajar.

== Marriage and children ==
The wedding of Galin Khanum and Abbas Mirza was celebrated with grand festivities, lasting seven nights across Iran. This marriage strengthened ties between the Devellu and Qovanlou families. They had several children, including Mohammad Mirza (later became Mohammad Shah), Bahman Mirza, Qahraman Mirza, and Bigum Khanum. Historical sources do not mention her given name, and she is often referred to by her titles such as "Galin Khanum" (lit. The Bride), "Mahd-e Olia", and "Mother of the Late King".

== Political and social role ==
Unlike the first Mahd-e Olia, Asiye Khanum (the mother of Fath-Ali Shah), who wielded personal power, Galin Khanum's authority stemmed largely from her familial connections. Her brother, Allahyar Khan Asef al-Dowleh, was a powerful political figure who frequently supported his sister in the political arena.

During the Russo-Iranian wars, when Tabriz was under threat, Galin Khanum, along with her children, was evacuated from Tabriz to Khamseh by the order of Fath-Ali Shah to ensure their safety.

After the death of Abbas Mirza in 1249 AH (1833 CE), Galin Khanum remained in Tabriz. When her son Mohammad Mirza ascended the throne as Mohammad Shah Qajar, her influence grew as the mother of the shah. She made efforts to secure power for her other sons, particularly Bahman Mirza and Qahraman Mirza, but Mohammad Shah, displaying political wisdom, appointed his own son, Naser al-Din Mirza, as the crown prince, in accordance with the will of Agha Mohammad Khan Qajar.

== Death ==
After Naser al-Din Shah ascended the Iranian throne, Galin Khanum gradually withdrew from political life and focused on her private affairs. She died in 1273 AH (1856 CE) and was buried in the shrine of Fatima Masumeh in Qom.

== Historical significance ==
Galin Khanum played a significant role in the political consolidation of the Qajar family, strengthening ties between powerful branches through her marriage. Though she is less well-known than other Qajar women such as Malek Jahan Khanum, the mother of Naser al-Din Shah, her influence on the politics and events of her time remains substantial.

== In media ==
In the 2010 Iranian TV drama Foggy Tabriz, Galin Khanum is portrayed by Kamand Amirsoleimani. In the drama, she is called Asieh Khanum.
