= Revolt of Hasan Khan Salar =

Unsuccessful revolt in Iran 1846–1850

Date	1846 – 23 March 1850
Location	Khorasan, Astarabad, and Shahrud-Bastam provinces, Qajar Iran
Result	State victory Khorasan is reincorporated into Iran

Belligerents
Sublime State of Iran	Forces Loyal to Hasan Khan Salar; Turkmen tribesmen Shadlu Kurdish tribesmen
- Herat (late 1848)

Commanders and leaders
Mohammad Shah Qajar (to 1848); Naser al-Din Shah Qajar (from 1848); Haji Mirza Aqasi; Amir Kabir; Hamzeh Mirza Heshmat od-Dowleh; Morad Mirza Hesam o-Saltaneh; Sam Khan Ilkhani Zafaranlu; Muhammad Ali Khan Maku'i; Muhammad Qoli Khan; Muhammad Vali Khan Qajaq Na'ib; Lotf 'Ali Khan Boghayri (POW); Emamverdi Khan Bayat; Asadollah Khan Khozeymeh; Navvab Mo'azzam Soleyman Khan Darah Khabri; Samson Makintsev; 'Abbas Qoli Khan bin Ebrahim Khan Badkubah; 'Ali Khan Qaragozlu; Hasan 'Ali Khan Sartip; Herat: Yar Muhammad Khan Alakozai; Jabbar Khan Alakozai	Hasan Khan Salar (executed); Amir Aslan Khan (executed); Mirza Mohammad Khan Beglerbegi (executed); Mohammad 'Ali Khan Qajar Develu (executed); Jafar Qoli Khan Shadlu (surrendered); Karimdad Khan Hazara (surrendered); Mohammad Baqer Khan Marvi †; Qara Ughlan An Baygi; Qushid Khan Sarakhsi; Uraz Khan Toqtamish Sarakhsi (surrendered); Bahadur Khan (surrendered); Abbas Qoli Khan Darragazi (surrendered)

Strength
Qajars: ≥6,000 (first phase); 8,000 (second phase); Herat: 19,000 infantry+cavalry 4 artillery pieces	37,000 (first phase); 2,000 (during the march on Mashhad) ≥10,000 (during the siege of Mashhad)

Casualties and losses
700+ (Regiment of Azerbaijan during the early revolt and Turkic Garrisons in Khorasan) † Several sold as captives to Khiva & Bukhara (from Regiments of Bayat, Maku and Azerbaijan) (POW) 1000+ Muskets lost (Regiment of Bayat) Several Thousands (Regiment of Arak and Azerbaijan in the whole Revolt)	2,000–3,000 (from the natives of Khorasan) †

The Revolt of Hasan Khan Salar (Persian: شورش حسن خان سالار) was a revolt that occurred in Khorasan from 1846 to 1850. It began as a result of the power struggle in the Qajar court. One of the factions manifested itself in Khorasan by Hasan Khan Salar. Salar's revolt sought to promote Bahman Mirza and his claim to power.

The first half of his revolt started in 1846 and was initially very successful, gaining the support of rebellious Turkmen tribes and the Shadlu Kurds who had long hated Qajar rule. However, Salar was defeated at Mayamey near Bistam in August 1847 and was forced to flee first to Akhal and then later to Serakhs. This ended the first part of the rebellion. However, with the death of Mohammad Shah Qajar on 4 September 1848, Salar was able to capture Mashhad with the support of the population and then extended his control over most of Khorasan. With the ascension of Naser al-Din Shah Qajar on 20 October, more attention was focused on crushing this revolt. After taking over several cities in the spring of 1849, government forces besieged Mashhad, resulting in its collapse in spring of 1850. Salar was executed shortly after.

== Background ==
=== Court Rivalry ===
After September 1845, Mohammad Shah Qajar was physically weakened, and rumors spread that he was dying. This resulted in the Qajar court dissolving into multiple factions that fought with each other. One faction was led by Allah Yar Khan Asef al-Dowleh, the uncle of Mohammad Shah and governor of Khorasan. He despised the Grand Vizier, Haji Mirza Aqasi, and wanted to take over his position. He failed and thus, he began to think of revolting. Asef al-Dowleh's son, Hasan Khan Salar, began to have ideas of his own and planned to seize Khorasan for himself. Mohammed Yusuf mentions that "Hasan Khan Salar, son of Asef al-Dowleh, whose mother was the great-great-grandchild of Khaqan, Fath 'Ali Shah, got the idea of revolting, and chanted this verse repeatedly:

I am ashamed of this kind of life; That I be Salar (leader), and act like a slave.-Hasan Khan Salar

=== Volatile Situation in Khorasan ===
Around this time the Tekke Turkmen began to raid around Mashhad with the support of the Jalayer tribe governing Kalat-e Naderi, which had remained independent since the beginning of Qajar rule over Khorasan. Jafar Qoli Khan Shadlu, the chieftain of the Shadlu Kurds, also assisted in raiding the vicinity of Mashhad. Asef al-Dowleh sent some retaliatory raids, but they were ineffective in discouraging the khan.

Kalat-e Naderi was finally conquered by Hasan Khan Salar in the first half of 1846. This benefited Asef al-Dowleh but not the shah, as he had become a threat to Qajar rule in Khorasan. Haji Mirza Aqasi planned to send troops to Khorasan to strengthen the Shah's authority there. Jafar Qoli Khan Shadlu, however, still refused to submit to the Shah and present himself at Tehran.

In the late summer of 1846 Asef al-Dowleh planned to invade Herat and depose Yar Muhammad Khan with the support of Mohammad Yusuf bin Malik Qasim Mirza and Shah Pasand Khan of Lash and Joveyn. However, Aqasi refused to authorise the plan, viewing it as an attempt for Asef al-Dowleh to gain more power.

=== Planning ===
Salar began to think of forming a tribal army to conquer Khorasan and expelling the Qajars, using Kalat as a base. He formed a marriage alliance with Jafar Qoli Khan Shadlu. Asef al-Dowleh initially supported his son but changed his mind in 1847 when Salar began to take money from Asef's treasury in order to pay for troops.

Asef al-Dowleh managed to convince the Shah to make Hasan Khan Salar the governor of Khorasan and appoint himself as guardian of Mashhad. However, once the Shah fulfilled these requests, Asef al-Dowleh began to crush those who gave their allegiance directly to the Shah and ordered the execution of the governor of the Nardin district, Mohammad Hasan Khan.

This was the last straw, and Asef was ordered to set out for Tehran, which he did, and took 400,000 tuman with him. Mirza Mohammad Khan Beglerbegi was sent to rule in Mashhad as a replacement. The governor of Bastam, Sulayman Khan, sent a 600-man force (composed of 500 riflemen, 100 cavalry, and two artillery pieces) with Mirza Mohammad Khan as an escort. Mirza Mohammad Khan then defected to Salar and joined him in rebelling against the Shah.

== War ==
=== First Phase of the Conflict ===
==== Initial Successes ====
Jafar Qoli Khan Shadlu and Hasan Khan Salar marched on Kalat and occupied it. When the news reached Asef al-Dowleh, he feared for his reputation and fled to go on pilgrimage in Mecca. He later went into exile in Karbala. Salar then marched to Sabzevar and captured the town. Ebrahim Khalil Khan was sent with 6,000 men from Tehran to Khorasan to suppress the rebellion. On 22 August 1847 he arrived at Bastam and consulted with the town's governor.

==== Defeat and Flight of Salar ====
Ebrahim Khalil Khan was to face Jafar Qoli Khan Shadlu and he would retreat to Bastam if he failed. Ebrahim ended up beating Jafar in several battles, forcing them to retreat. Shortly after Salar arrived at Mazinan with 24-25,000 men and sent 1,000 cavalry to aid Jafar Qoli Khan Shadlu. Muhammad Qoli Khan arrived at Damghan with 4 regiments and 10 artillery and marched to aid Ibrahim Khalil Khan. 12,000 Khorasani cavalry made a surprise attack on Muhammad Ali Khan's camp but they were routed and fled to Salar's camp at Meyami. At this point Salar knew he was defeated and when the Qajar soldiers tore his forces to shreds he and his supporters fled to Joveyn and intended to take sanctuary at Kalat, sending his son, Amir Aslan Khan, with his wealth there. However, the people of Kalat hated the Shadlu occupation of their territory so they rebelled and refused to let Amir Aslan Khan in. Hamzeh Mirza Heshmat od-Dowleh arrived in Buzanjird and appointed Muhammad Ali Khan Maku'i to govern the district. He then marched to Mashhad with Ibrahim Khalil Khan and arrived there in October. According to Hidayat, Qaen was reincorporated into government control shortly after this, but Noelle-Karimi suggests that it's more likely the Khozeimeh Amirdom managed to stay free from Salar until his resurgence in late 1848.

==== Renewed Attacks ====
Salar then fled to Buzanjird but although it was a Shadlu stronghold the people sided against Salar so he fled to Akhal with Jafar Qoli Khan Shadlu. The chief of the Toqtamish Turkmens there, Qara Ughlan An Baygi, agreed to support him since he had brought 40,000 toman with him and offered to give some to the Turkmens. They then marched on Buzanjird with 10,000 cavalry, as Mohammad Ali Khan Maku'i had committed atrocities on the populace and thus the people welcomed Salar. When Hamzeh Mirza heard of this, he made the Zafaranlu Ilkhani governor of Buzanjird and marched there along with Mohammad Vali Khan Qajaq Na'ib. Salar and his allies fled and Hamzeh Mirza hoped the snow would stop their escape so he could crush them. Hamzeh Mirza then went to Maneh and encamped there for 40 days. On 13 December 1847, Jafar Qoli Khan tried to raid Hamzeh Mirza's camp at Maneh, but the raid was unsuccessful. The only gain from the battle was the capture of Lotf 'Ali Khan Boghayri, the commander of Qaleh Khan. He was sent to Akhal after the raid.

==== Fleeing to Sarakhs ====
In the winter of 1847–1848 Salar left the Turkmens (supposedly due to internal conflicts between the Tuqutmash and Utmash) and fled to the ra'is of Sarakhs, Arad/Araz/Uraz Khan Toqtamish Sarakhsi. Jafar Qoli Khan then laid an ambush in Gorgan, causing Hamzeh Mirza to send an Afshar and Khorasani force led by 'Abd Allah Khan Afshar Sayin Qal'ah. This force routed Jafar Qoli Khan Shadlu, causing him to flee to Herat in the hopes of seeking protection under Yar Muhammad Khan Alakozai. Hamzeh Mirza then launched an expedition against the Turkmens of Akhal and Gorgan, reportedly advancing 17 farsangs every day and taking 300 Turkmen prisoners. They were resettled in Samalqan due to the urging of Mir Sa'd Allah Fendereski. Shortly thereafter, Hasan Khan Salar marched on Mashhad with 8,000 men, but was routed at Kal Yaquti, a suburb of Mashhad. Salar was then further defeated at Qarabaqa'ah (5 farsangs from Mashhad) and the Turkmen of Sarakhs defected.

=== Second Phase of the Conflict ===
==== Mashhad Rebellion and Death of Mohammad Shah ====
Hamzeh Mirza had gotten ill and a power vacuum ensued in Mashhad. Mirza Mohammad Khan used this to forge alliances with local leaders and incite the people of Mashhad into revolting against the Qajars. Simultaneously, Qajar troops in Mashhad (in particular the Turkic regiments as well as those of Hamadan) had harmed the local population and became increasingly unpopular within the city. The city finally exploded on 25 August 1848 with the support of the local ulema. The populace massacred government officials and soldiers (around 700 according to Mojtahed-Zadeh) and besieged Hamzeh Mirza in the citadel. When Hasan Khan Salar became aware of this, he marched on Mashhad with 2,000 Turkmen. Villages up to 10 farsangs away from Mashhad joined Salar and the population welcomed him and the recently returned Jafar Qoli Khan Shadlu. The death of Mohammad Shah Qajar on 4 September only made the situation worse. Hamzeh Mirza began to run out of supplies.

The Court Historian of Qajar Era, Mirza Mohammad Taqi Khan Sepehr (Lisan-al Mulk) in his Description of the rebellion:

The Beglarbegi gave order that the gates of the sacred court be sealed, and for several days they were left without bread and water, until perforce they consented to slaughter and captivity, and they came forth. Then he commanded that some of them be beheaded, others sold to the Turkmens, and a number imprisoned, hungry and thirsty, in the bathhouse of the lower Khiyaban. When he had finished these deeds, a messenger swifter than lightning and wind was sent to the Sālār, saying: "Why do you still sit idle? Arise and take the road to the city, for the affair has gone according to desire." The scholars of the city also wrote to him, saying: "From now on we shall not obey the people of Azerbaijan, for we deem them outside the law of the Imami [Twelver] sharīa, since their soldiers entered the women's bathhouse and fornicated with the women of the people.

==== Intervention of Yar Mohammad Khan Alakozai ====
Fortunately for Hamzeh Mirza, he was soon to be rescued from his predicament. The ruler of Herat, Yar Mohammad Khan Alakozai, seemed like a supporter of Hasan Khan Salar from the outside. He had even given Jafar Qoli Khan Shadlu protection. Both sides had asked for the support of Yar Mohammad. Eventually Yar Mohammad marched on Mashhad with 2,000 troops or 19,000 infantry and cavalry and 4 artillery pieces. The chief Mujtahid of Mashhad tried to discourage Hamzeh Mirza from asking for Afghan assistance because they were Sunnis, but Hamzeh Mirza refused his request.

There are two stories of the events in Mashhad. The first story is told by Mohamed Yusuf. Yusuf states that the Afghans entered the city and Salar's troops left. The Qajar forces still in the Arg of Mashhad arrayed their forces facing the Afghans. Yar Mohammad then asked the nobles of Herat which side to choose. One of them made a speech suggesting the Afghans side with the government and fire on Salar's troops. Yar Mohammad was convinced by this and began to jointly attack the Afghans with the help of Hamzeh Mirza's forces in the citadel.

The other story, told by Faiz Muhammad, says that Jafar Qoli Khan Shadlu convinced Yar Mohammad to march to Mashhad to aid Salar. However, he sent a letter to Hamzeh Mirza, saying he was there to aid him and would not join the side of Salar. A dispute arose over where the Afghan army would camp and when rumors spread of Hamzeh Mirza and Yar Mohammad's alliance Salar warned Yar Mohammad that if he tried to link up with the Qajars in the citadel they would use force to stop it. Yar Mohammad then manipulated Jafar Qoli Khan Shadlu, claiming "I must first go to the citadel and take possession of it. Only then can I enter the city with an easy mind.” Jafar Qoli Khan consented and although the people of Mashhad attempted to stop Hamzeh Mirza and Yar Mohammad from linking up they ultimately failed in this attempt. Yar Mohammad was able to take Jafar Qoli Khan prisoner.

However, the allies suffered a drawback a few days later with 700 killed and 300 wounded and it became clear their situation in the city was unmaintainable. Hamzeh Mirza and Yar Mohammad withdrew to Herat. Some surviving soldiers managed to escape to Tehran. Yar Mohammad Khan also occupied Jam and Khaf in an attempt to expel the rebels. Hamza would winter near Ghourian from middle-late December 1848 until late February 1849 or late March-early April 1849. On the way there, Jafar Qoli Khan proposed that they release him and in exchange he would help them withdraw. When Jafar Qoli Khan was released but didn't fulfill his promise, Hamzeh Mirza and Yar Mohammad Khan Alakozai destroyed the fortifications of Mashhad and disabled the artillery. When they reached Jam, they besieged Fariman fort because the commander, Bahadur Khan, had captured several of Yar Mohammad Khan's men on his march to Mashhad. On 15 November 1848 he surrendered and agreed to supply the retreating army.

==== Qajar Counterattack and Defections ====
With the departure of Hamza Mirzeh, Hasan Khan Salar was able to drastically extend his power. He conquered Sabzevar, Torshiz, Joveyn, Buzanjird, Qaen, Esfarayn, and Torbat-e Haidari. Amir Asadollah Khan of Qaen saw that his forces couldn't defend the region from Salar anymore. Instead of facing punishment by the Qajar forces, he fled to Herat. His son Alam Khan was captured for a brief period but later managed to escape to his father in Herat. The reign of Salar over Qaen was cruel and a mullah who was friendly towards Asadollah Khan was blown from a gun because he continued to preach Asadollah Khan during his sermons. Nishapur under Imamverdi Khan Bayat had resisted Salar even though he was applying substantial pressure on the city. With the crowning of Naser al-Din Shah Qajar on 20 October, Tehran was anxious to resolve the conflict. Morad Mirza was sent with a force of 7,000 and 4 artillery pieces to reconquer Khorasan. Yar Mohammad sent 1,000 troops under Jabbar Khan Alakozai to aid Morad Mirza. As a result he gained the favour of the shah and Naser al-Din gave the Heratis 4 cannons in recognition of their help. Yar Mohammad also received the title of Zahir al-Dowleh.

The royal forces were dependent on the Zafaranlu Kurds for aid, as it was the middle of winter. However, Jafar Qoli Khan Shadlu was afraid of the wrath of the state and submitted to the Qajars. He left Khorasan for Tehran on 25 January 1849. Many other khans defected as well. During February, Hasan Khan Salar lost control over Qaen, Torshiz, Torbat-e Haidari, and Joveyn. Salar attempted to stop the Qajar force at Joveyn, however he was routed and 200 of his men were killed in the battle. Shortly after this, Sabzevar, which was besieged shortly before the Battle of Joveyn, fell on 9 March. Mirza Mohammad Khan was taken prisoner. Qajar forces reportedly committed atrocities during the siege of Sabzevar, which would only further strengthen the resolve of the people of Mashhad to resist government forces. Morad Mirza then marched on Nishapur and reached the city on 21 March. Imamverdi Khan Bayat welcomed Morad Mirza into Nishapur.

==== Siege of Mashhad and Execution of Salar ====
===== Attempt at Negotiations =====
The royal court sent Cheragh-Ali Khan Zanganeh to Mashhad to negotiate with Hasan Khan Salar. Reportedly, Zanganeh offered Salar 95,000 tuman and the governorship of Hamadan, Zanjan, and Qazvin if he were to unconditionally surrender. However, Hasan Khan Salar refused unconditional surrender and made negotiation impossible. He also had the support of the regional Afshar, Turkmen, and Hazara tribes. As mentioned before, the people of Mashhad were extremely loyal to Salar due to their hatred of the government. Reportedly, even beggars would arm themselves during the siege to defend the city from government forces. Morad Mirza sent Nawab Mu'azzam Sulayman Khan Darah Khabri to capture Kalat while he marched toward Mashhad and besieged it in June. 10,000 of Salar's forces marched out to do battle with them but were heavily defeated and retreated back into the city.

===== Fall of Mashhad =====
Hasan Khan Salar's forces suffered defeat after defeat. His soldiers had no money and so he had an idea and decided to sack the Imam Reza Shrine to confiscate the ornaments to pay for his troops. So in October 1849 he did so, and 22,000 toman fell into his hands. This action made him increasingly unpopular within the city. He also put the ulema of Mashhad in prison because they had not issued a fatwa approving of his actions. Salar's forces also committed atrocities on the local population. They stole the property of locals, raped women, and sold citizens to the Turkmen slavers. Two more Qajar armies reached the walls at Mashhad and by this time the people were tired of Salar. On 13 March or 23 March 1850, Mashhad surrendered to the Qajars, ending Hasan Khan Salar's 4 year long revolt. Hasan Khan Salar, his son Amir Aslan Khan, and his brother Mohammad Ali Khan Qajar Develu were all executed on 29 April. Mirza Mohammad Khan was executed on 21 May. Morad Mirza was given the title Hesam o-Saltaneh for crushing the rebellion.

== Sources ==
- Yusuf, Mohamed. (1988) A History of Afghanistan, from 1793 A.D., to 1865 A.D. New York University, ISBN 1466222417 pp. 98–148
- Noelle-Karimi, Christine. (2014) The Pearl In Its Midst: Herat and the mapping of Khurasan (15th-19th centuries). Austrian Academy of Sciences ISBN 978-3-7001-7202-4 pg. 191 and pp. 227–230
- McChesney, Robert; Khorrami, Mohammad Mehdi. (2012) The History of Afghanistan (6 vol. set): Fayż Muḥammad Kātib Hazārah's Sirāj al-tawārīkh. BRILL ISBN 9004234985 pp. 207–209
- Mojtahed-Zadeh, Pirouz. (1993) Evolution of Eastern Iranian boundaries: Role of the Khozeimeh Amirdom of Qaenat and Sistan. PhD thesis. SOAS University of London.
- Amanat, Abbas (2005). The Pivot of the Universe: Nasir al-Din Shah and the Iranian Monarchy, 1831-1896. I.B.Tauris ISBN 1845110684 pp. 114–115
- Algar, Hamid (1989). AMĪR KABĪR, MĪRZĀ TAQĪ KHAN Encyclopædia Iranica.
