= Hamzeh Mirza Heshmat od-Dowleh =

Qajar prince and official (died 1880)

Hamzeh Mirza
- Heshmat od-Dowleh
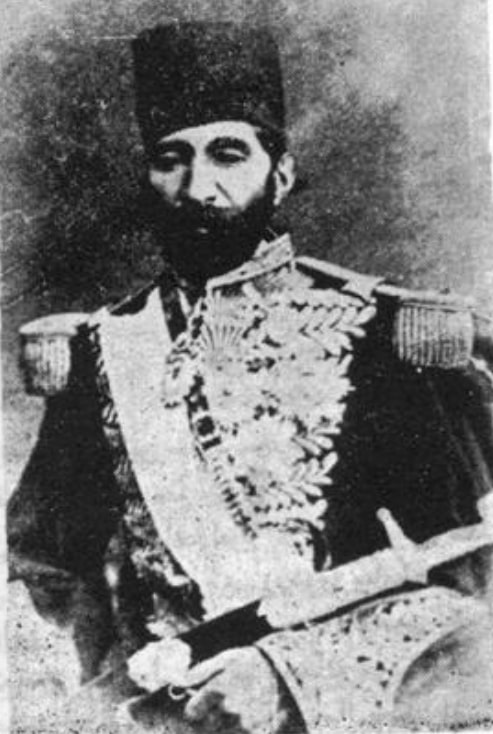
- Photograph of Hamzeh Mirza Heshmat od-Dowleh
- Died: 1880; Near Baneh, Iran
- Dynasty: Qajar
- Father: Abbas Mirza
- Religion: Twelver Shia Islam
- Military career
- Conflicts: First Herat War; Revolt of Hasan Khan Salar

Hamzeh Mirza Heshmat od-Dowleh (Persian: حمزه ‌میرزا حشمت‌الدوله; died 1880) was a Qajar prince, governor and military officer in 19th-century Iran. The 21st son of Crown Prince Abbas Mirza, Hamzeh Mirza held various governorships and led several military campaigns, notably against the Revolt of Hasan Khan Salar. He remained active in the country's military and administrative affairs until his death.

== Biography ==
=== Background and early career ===
A member of the ruling Qajar dynasty of Iran, Hamzeh Mirza was the 21st son of Abbas Mirza, who served as crown prince until his death from an illness in 1832. Hamzeh Mirza participated in the Herat war of 1837–1838, which had erupted due to the disobedience of the Iranian vassal Kamran Mirza Durrani, who ruled Herat. Due to his contributions, Hamzeh Mirza was later rewarded with the governorship of the western city of Qazvin in 1839 by his suzerain Mohammad Shah Qajar (r. 1834–1848), who was also his brother. However, he was dismissed shortly after for his misbehavior. Later that year, Mohammad Shah appointed him governor of another city in the west, Zanjan. In 1847, Hamzeh Mirza became the governor of the eastern Khorasan province, tasked with suppressing the Revolt of Hasan Khan Salar, a power struggle by the Davalu clan of the Qajars. The provincial capital of Khorasan was Mashhad, which was commonly governed by a Qajar prince. In August 1847, Hamzeh Mirza defeated Hasan Khan Salar near Bastam, leading to the latters withdrawal to the Turkmens in Akhal.

The misconduct of Hamzeh Mirza's army in Mashhad and its surroundings in the fall of 1848 led to unrest, which significantly increased Hasan Khan Salar's opportunities. While Hamzeh Mirza had briefly left Mashhad, Hasan Khan Salar's brother Mirza Mohammad Khan Beglerbegi made alliances with the local authorities. The latter openly rebelled on 25 August 1848, when he had the motavalli-bashi (custodian) Hajji Mirza Abdollah Khoi and darugha (prefect) Ebrahim Soltan killed. Pointing out the misconduct carried out by Hamzeh Mirza's army, some of the clergy in Mashhad declared jihad against him. After Hasan Khan Salar was informed of the situation in Mashhad, he marched towards the city with 2,000 Turkmen soldiers.

Hamzeh Mirza's position was made worse when word of Mohammad Shah's death (who was succeeded by his son Naser al-Din Shah) on 4 September 1848 spread throughout Khorasan. He was soon trapped in the Mashhad fortress and ran out of supplies. Yar Muhammad Khan Alakozai, the vizier of Herat, traveled to Mashhad where he helped Hamzeh Mirza, while feigning support for Hasan Khan Salar. After destroying all heavy weaponry and burning the defensive structures, Hamzeh Mirza accepted Yar Muhammad Khan's suggestion to stay in Ghuriyan during the winter due to the situation in Mashhad. This period marked the lowest point of Qajar rule over Khorasan. Hamzeh Mirza stayed there from the middle of December 1848 to late March 1849. Meanwhile, Hasan Khan Salar enlarged his domain in Khorasan, but was ultimately defeated and executed in the spring of 1850 by Morad Mirza, a full-brother of Hamzeh Mirza.

=== Governorship of Azerbaijan ===
Map of the northeastern part of the Azerbaijan province and its surroundings

After Hamzeh Mirza's return to Iran in 1849, he was given the title "Heshmat od-Dowleh" and appointed governor of Azerbaijan. He appointed Mirza Mohammad Qavam al-Dawla as his minister. While en route to Tabriz to start his new position, Hamzeh Mirza met the governor Abbasqoli Khan Mo'tamed od-Dowleh Javanshir at Zanjan. They were informed that a conflict had broken out between the Hajji-Khojalu and Damirchili tribes (both from the Shahsevan branch in Meshginshahr), which had resulted in multiple casualties. As a result, they moved toward the Ardabil region and wrote to several Shahsevan and Qaradaghi chiefs, commanding that they gather troops and subdue the Hajji-Khojalu, which seemingly ended in a success. Reaching Tabriz, Hamzeh Mirza and Abbasqoli Khan sent instructions to the nobles of Qaradagh to apprehend certain Shahsevan leaders, assigning 500 cavalry to ensure their transport to Tabriz. Hamzeh Mirza also dismissed Farzi Khan as the chieftain of Meshginshahr. As a result, the latter started extensive raiding operations.

In 1850, Hamzeh Mirza was ordered by the prime minister Amir Kabir to capture Báb at Chehriq and execute him at Tabriz due to the unrest caused by his followers across the country. Hamzeh Mirza was reluctant to execute Báb, as he believed it was wrong to kill a seyyed, and was unhappy that Amir Kabir had given him the task, as he expected assignments more aligned with war and conquest. In the summer of that year, Hamzeh Mirza had Báb executed.

In the summer of 1851, Hamzeh Mirza received orders to travel to Ardabil and Meshginshahr to stop the Shahsevan tribes from wintering on the Russian-ruled part of the Mughan plain, which served as their traditional winter quarters. While in Meshginshahr, Hamzeh Mirza invited the main leaders of the Shahsevan tribes, claiming he wanted to discuss matters for the well-being of the tribes. However, once they gathered in his camp, they were captured, shackled, and sent to the prison in Tabriz. It is uncertain which tribes were involved. The captured tribal leaders were Farzi Khan (likely the same Farzi Khan that Hamzeh Mirza had earlier dismissed), Eskandar Khan, Salim Khan, Roushan Khan, Qasem Khan of Shaki, Shah Palang, Shah Mar, and Mollah Mo'men.

Several Shahsevan prisoners petitioned to be pardoned by Naser al-Din Shah in November 1851. The British representative and consul-general in Tabriz, Richard Stevens, suggested that only Salim Khan and the brothers Shah Palang and Shah Mar were to be held in prison, whereas Hamzeh Mirza suggested that all of the Shahsevan leaders should be held in prison to maintain border security. Farzi Khan was ultimately freed and restored to his position as chieftain of Meshginshahr, while the fate of the other prisoners remains unknown.

=== Later career and death ===
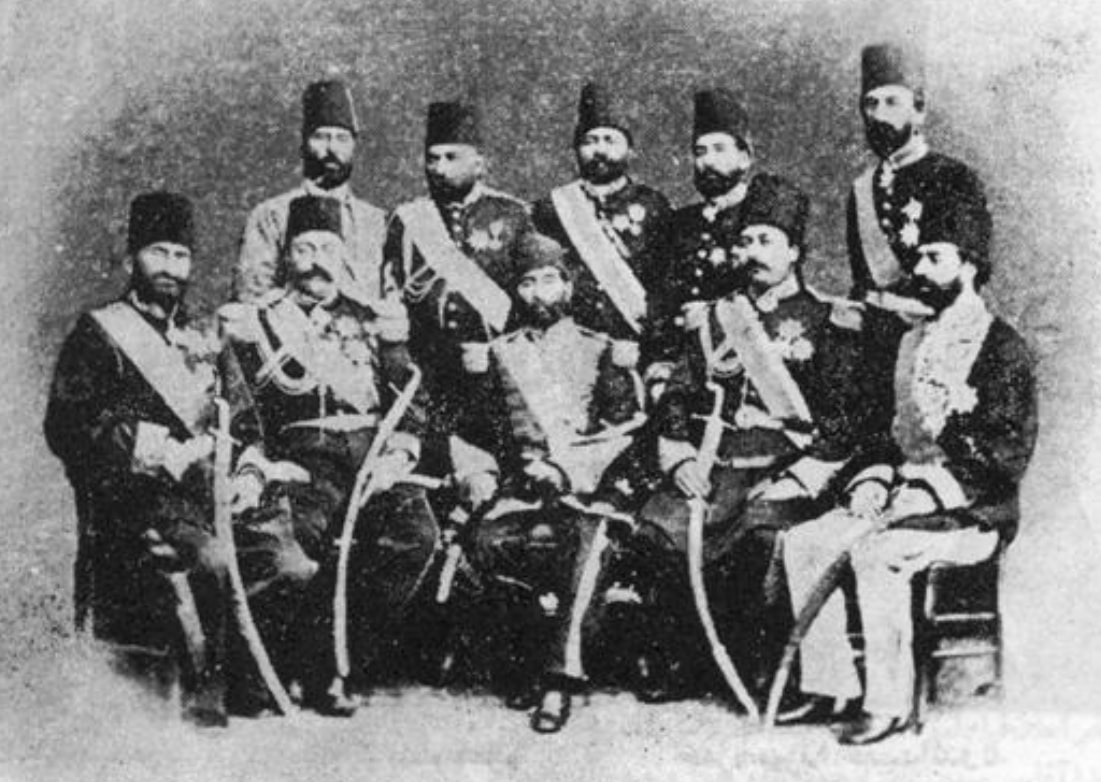
Photograph of Hamzeh Mirza Heshmat od-Dowleh (seated in the middle) along with several other high-ranking Iranian officers in Tbilisi, 1871/72

Hamzeh Mirza's governorship of Azerbaijan lasted until 1854, when he was summoned to Tehran. From 1855 to 1858, he served as the governor of Isfahan. He was then once again summoned to Tehran and later reinstated as the governor of Khorasan in 1859. In 1860, Hamzeh Mirza was ordered to deal with the rebellion by the Turkmens of Marv. He suffered heavy losses in the subsequent battle and had to withdraw due to a shortage of supplies. Following this defeat, the Russian Empire took control over Marv. Hamzeh Mirza was summoned to Tehran, where he was deprived of his titles, positions, and privileges by Naser al-Din Shah. However, in return for giving gifts to Naser al-Din Shah, Hamzeh Mirza was appointed as the governor of Yazd in 1862. From 1864 to 1866, he held occasional positions as governor of Khuzestan, Lorestan, and Khorasan. In 1868/69, he was appointed as the first minister of war, receiving the title of "Amir Jang".

In 1870, Hamzeh Mirza captured several forts controlled by Turkmens. In 1871, Naser al-Din Shah sent Hamzeh Mirza and several high-ranking officers to the city of Tbilisi to welcome the Russian emperor Alexander II (r. 1855–1881). In March/April 1872, they returned to Tehran. In 1872/73, Hamzeh Mirza was re-appointed as governor of Khorasan and Lorestan, serving until 1875/76, when his older brother Bahram Mirza succeeded him. In 1876, Hamzeh Mirza once again received the governorship of Khuzestan and Lorestan. He is thereafter not mentioned in sources until 1880, when he was ordered to suppress the rebellion of Sheikh Ubeydullah, a leader of the Kurdish branch of the Sufi order Naqshbandi. Before he could engage Sheikh Ubeydullah, Hamzeh Mirza died near Baneh.

== Sources ==
- Amanat, Abbas (1997). Pivot of the Universe: Nasir Al-Din Shah Qajar and the Iranian Monarchy, 1831–1896. I.B. Tauris. ISBN 978-1845118280.
- Amanat, Abbas (2003). "Herat vi. The Herat question". In Yarshater, Ehsan (ed.). Encyclopædia Iranica (Online ed.). Encyclopædia Iranica Foundation. ISBN 978-0710090959.
- Bamdad, Mehdi (1972). شرح حال رجال ایران در قرن ۱۲ و ۱۳ و ۱۴ هجری [Biographies of [notable] personages of Iran in the 12th, 13th, and 14th/18th, 19th, and 20th centuries, vol. 1].
- Beigi, Maryam Arjah (2014). "Hamzeh Mirza Heshmat od-Dowleh". Encyclopaedia of the World of Islam (in Persian). Vol. 14. Encyclopaedia Islamica Foundation. ISBN 9789644470127.
- Bosworth, Clifford Edmund (2007). Historic Cities of the Islamic World. Brill. ISBN 978-9004153882.
- Busse, H. (1982). "ʿAbbās Mīrzā Qajar". In Yarshater, Ehsan (ed.). Encyclopædia Iranica (Online ed.). Encyclopædia Iranica Foundation. ISBN 978-0710090959.
- Noelle-Karimi, Christine (2014). The Pearl in its Midst: Herat and the Mapping of Khurasan (15th-19th Centuries). Austrian Academy of Sciences. ISBN 978-3700172024.
- Mousavi, Mehdi (2018). "Nāṣir al-Dīn Shah Qajar". In Thomas, David Richard (ed.). Christian-Muslim Relations. A Bibliographical History Volume 20. Iran, Afghanistan and the Caucasus (1800–1914). Brill. doi:10.1163/2451-9537_cmrii_COM_33868. ISBN 978-9004471689.
- Tapper, Richard (1997). Frontier Nomads of Iran: A Political and Social History of the Shahsevan. Cambridge University Press. ISBN 978-0-52158-336-7.
- Tapper, Richard (2010). "Shahsevan". In Yarshater, Ehsan (ed.). Encyclopædia Iranica (Online ed.). Encyclopædia Iranica Foundation. ISBN 978-0710090959.
