= Mirza Mohammad Khan Beglerbegi =

Mirza Mohammad Khan Beglerbegi (Persian: میرزا محمد خان بیگلربیگی) was a 19th-century Iranian official from the Qajar tribe and the third of son of Asef al-Dowleh.

In 1847, his father appointed him as his deputy in the city of Mashhad in the Khorasan province. Soon afterwards, Mirza Mohammad Khan's elder brother Hasan Khan Salar started a large rebellion as part of a power struggle by the Davalu clan of the Qajars. After the Qajar prince Hamzeh Mirza Heshmat od-Dowleh forced Hasan Khan Salar to retreat and entered Mashhad, Mirza Mohamad Khan retreated to the Imam Reza shrine on 27 October 1847.

The misconduct of Hamzeh Mirza's army in Mashhad and its surroundings in the fall of 1848 led to unrest, which significantly increased Hasan Khan Salar's opportunities. While Hamzeh Mirza had briefly left Mashhad, Mirza Mohammad Khan made alliances with the local authorities. The latter openly rebelled on 25 August 1848, when he had the motavalli-bashi (custodian) Hajji Mirza Abdollah Kho'i and darugha (prefect) Ebrahim Soltan killed. Pointing out the misconduct carried out by Hamzeh Mirza's army, some of the clergy in Mashhad declared jihad against him. After Hasan Khan Salar was informed of the situation in Mashhad, he marched towards the city with 2,000 Turkmen soldiers. Hasan Khan Salar continued enlarging his domain in Khorasan, but was ultimately defeated and executed in the spring of 1850 by the Qajar prince Morad Mirza. Mirza Mohammad Khan was executed in Tehran on 21 May 1850.

== Sources ==
- Amanat, Abbas (1997). Pivot of the Universe: Nasir Al-Din Shah Qajar and the Iranian Monarchy, 1831–1896. I.B. Tauris. ISBN 978-1845118280.
- Noelle-Karimi, Christine (2014). The Pearl in its Midst: Herat and the Mapping of Khurasan (15th-19th Centuries). Austrian Academy of Sciences. ISBN 978-3700172024.
