= Darab Mirza Qajar =

Azerbaijani Russian military commander

- Azerbaijani: Darab mirzə Qovanlı-Qacar
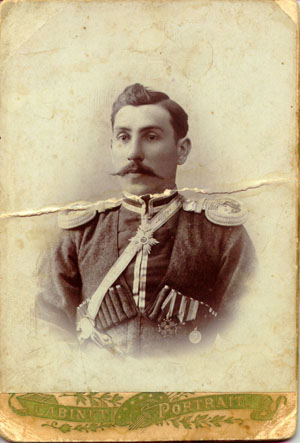
- Born: Shahrukh Darab Mirza; 15 December 1868 or 9 March 1869; Shusha, Russian Empire
- Died: 1930 (aged 61 or 62); Tehran, Imperial State of Iran
- Military career
- Rank: Colonel
- Conflicts: World War I
- Awards: Order of Saint Anna (3); Order of Saint Stanislaus; Order of Glory Ribbon Bar

Darab Mirza Qajar (15 December 1868 or 9 March 1869 – 1930) was a military commander in the Russian Imperial Army, colonel, grandson of the Qajar prince Bahman Mirza, and a participant in World War I.

== Life ==
Darab Mirza, son of Shah-Rukh Mirza, was born on 9 May 1869 in the city of Shusha. In some sources, the date of his birth is indicated as 15 December 1868 or 9 March 1869. He received his general education at home and in the Tiflis Cadet Corps.

== Military service ==
Darab Mirza began his service on 1 September 1889 as an ordinary cadet at the Pavlovsk Military School. On 5 May 1890, he was promoted to non-commissioned officer. After graduating from college in the 1st category on 5 August 1891, he was promoted to cornet (seniority from 10 August 1890) in the 1st Poltava cavalry regiment of the Kuban Cossack army. He began his service in the regiment on 12 September 1891. From February 1892 to October 1894 he served as a junior officer in various hundreds of the regiment.

On 1 June 1895, was promoted to centurion. On 15 October 1895, was enlisted in the 2nd Poltava cavalry regiment of the Kuban Cossack army. Arriving at the place of service, he began serving as a junior officer in the 6th hundred. On 13 September 1987, he was enlisted in the first hundred of the regiment as a junior officer. On 12 August 1898, he was sent to study at the Cossack department of the Officers' Rifle School. He completed the course on 28 August 1899.

On 23 September 1900, he was allowed to accept and wear the "Order of the Lion and the Sun". In addition, he was awarded the medal "In the memory of the reign of Tsar Alexander III" and the medal "For work in the first general population census". On 23 January 1901, he was awarded the Order of Saint Stanislaus of 3rd degree.

On 1 December 1901, he was appointed acting head of weapons in the regiment. On 10 May 1903, he was appointed commander of the 4th hundred regiment. On 1 June 1903, he was promoted to podyesaul. From 9 June to 11 September 1903, he served in the Julfa detachment on the border with Iran. From 29 May 1904 to 5 March 1905, he commanded the 2nd hundred of the 2nd Poltava cavalry regiment of the Kuban Cossack army. On 12 October 1905, he was seconded to the 1st Poltava cavalry regiment of the Kuban Cossack army.

On 6 May 1908, he was awarded the Order of Saint Anne of 3rd degree.

On 6 May 1909, he was promoted to yesaul for his long service. On 10 June 1909, he was transferred to the 1st Labinsk General Zass Regiment of the Kuban Cossack Host. On 15 May 1910, he was dismissed from service by the Highest Order.

Later, returning to service with the same rank of yesaul, on 4 March 1911, Darab Mirza was appointed commander of the 5th hundred of the 1st Line General Velyaminov Regiment of the Kuban Cossack Army.

=== During World War I ===
Mirza participated in the First World War as the commander of the 5th hundred of the 1st line Regiment of the Kuban Cossack Army. On 4 August 1914, he proved heroism in a battle near the village of Gorodok, personally commanding a hundred of 109 people, he made a horse attack on 3 squadrons of Austrians who were trying to surround them. Although the number of the opposing side was much larger and despite the strong shrapnel fire of their artillery, he led a hundred to the enemy's front. About 3 Austrian squadrons were destroyed and thus the course of the battle was changed. In this battle, Darab Mirza received a severe saber wound.

On 11 October 1914, the highest order approved the award of the Saint George weapon to the commander of the 8th Army. On 2 April 1915, he was promoted to military foreman for military distinction. On 7 July 1915, he was transferred to the 3rd Line Regiment of the Kuban Cossack Army which operated on the Caucasian front. "For distinction in cases against the enemy" by the order of the 8th Army No.435 he was awarded swords and a bow to the Order of Saint Stanislav of 3rd degree. The highest award was approved on 12 June 1916. On 19 November 1916 "for distinction in cases against the enemy" he was awarded the Order of Saint Anne of 2nd degree with swords. On 23 February 1917, by the highest order, he was enrolled in the Kuban Cossack Army at the disposal of the military authorities.

On 5 October 1917, by the order of the army and navy, he was promoted to the rank of colonel.

== Later years ==
Darab Mirza went to Iran at the invitation of Ahmad-Shah Qajar. Reza Shah Pahlavi, who came to power after the fall of the Qajar dynasty in 1925, arrested Darab Mirza since he saw him as a threat to his power. In 1930, he was imprisoned in Tehran and died due to harsh conditions. According to relatives, he was killed in prison.

== Awards ==
- Order of the Lion and the Sun of 3rd degree (23 September 1900).
- Order of Saint Stanislaus of 3rd degree (23 January 1901).
- Order of Saint Anne of 3rd degree (6 May 1908).
- Saint George's weapon (11 October 1914).
- Swords and a bow to the existing Order of Saint Anne of 3rd degree (17 January 1916)
- Swords and a bow to the existing Order of Saint Stanislaus of 3rd degree (12 June 1916)
- Order of Saint Anna of 2nd degree with swords (19 November 1916)

== Family ==
Mirza's father, Shahrukh-Mirza Qajar, was the son of Bahman Mirza Qajar, a Persian statesman, a field marshal of Iran and an heir to the throne of Azerbaijan.
