= Hossein Khan Shahsevan =

Iranian military commander and statesman (d. 1875)

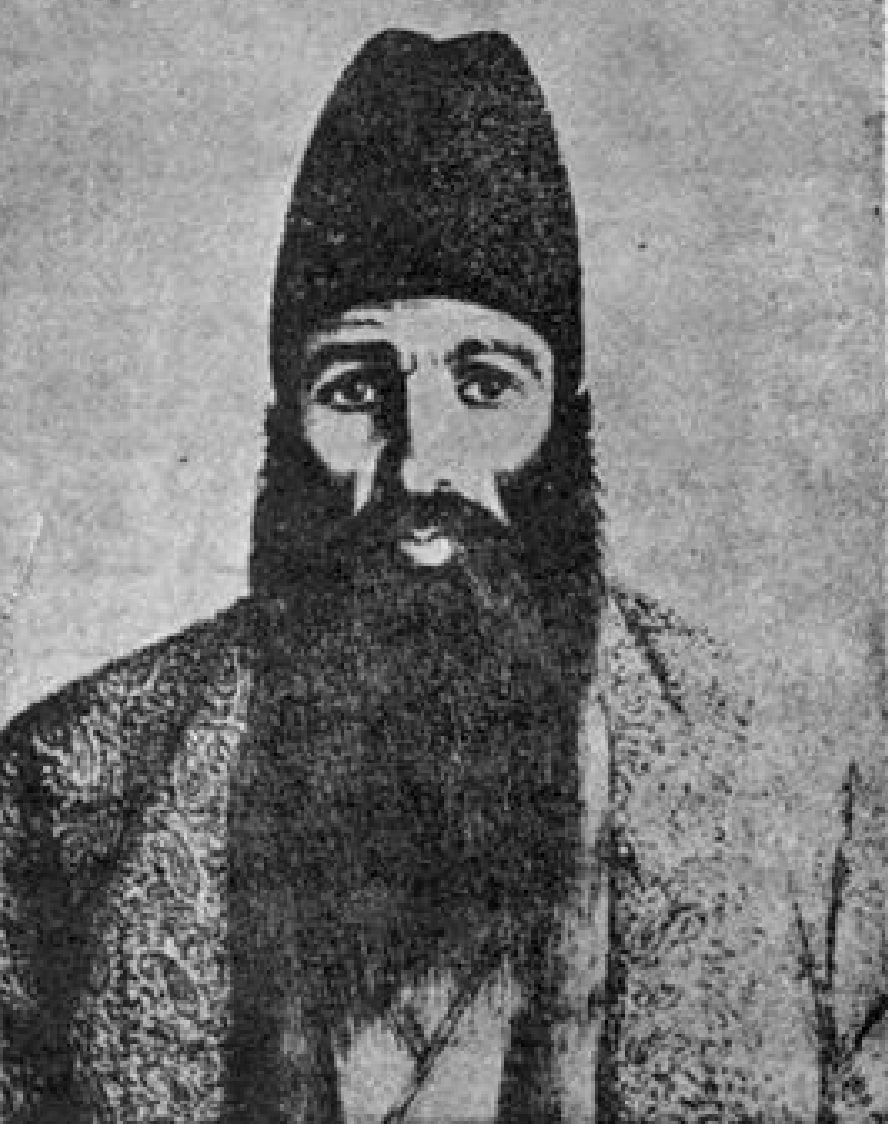
- Portrait of Hossein Khan Shahsevan
- Died: 14 February 1875; Mashhad, Qajar Iran
- Military career
- Allegiance: Qajar Iran
- Conflicts: Second Herat War

Hossein Khan Shahsevan (Persian: حسین‌خان شاهسون) was a military commander and statesman in Qajar Iran.

== Biography ==
He was one of the commanders of the Iranian army that conquered Herat in 1856. After this, he returned to Tehran and was commended by Naser al-Din Shah Qajar (r. 1848–1896), being promoted to the rank of sartipi (Brigadier General). In 1857–1858, he was appointed as the chaparchi (Head of the Postal Administration). In 1859/60, he was given the title Shahab ol‑Molk. In 1865/66, he was promoted to the rank of amir-e tuman, and the following year he was appointed commander of the Khorasan forces and went to war against the Turkmens, who frequently raided the northern borders of Khorasan. After the death of Mohammad Esmail Khan Nuri Vakil ol-Molk, Hossein Khan became the governor of Kerman province.

In 1871/72, Mirza Hosein Khan Sepahsalar, the prime minister of Naser al‑Din Shah, dismissed Morad Mirza Hesam o-Saltaneh from the governorship of Khorasan for disobeying orders. Hossein Khan was appointed governor of Khorasan in his place and was tasked with moving quickly to personally deliver the news of Morad Mirza's dismissal in Mashhad and send him to Tehran.

In 1874/75, Hossein Khan was given the title Nezam ol‑Dowleh, and on 14 February 1875, while still serving as governor of Khorasan, died in Mashhad. He was the father of the military officer Gholamreza Khan Inanlu.

== Sources ==
- Bamdad, Mehdi (1968). شرح حال رجال ایران در قرن ۱۲ و ۱۳ و ۱۴ هجری [Dictionary of National Biography of Iran, 1700-1960, vol. 1].
- Bamdad, Mehdi (1971). شرح حال رجال ایران در قرن ۱۲ و ۱۳ و ۱۴ هجری [Dictionary of National Biography of Iran, 1700-1960, vol. 3].
