= Kalat-e Naderi =

Coordinates: 37°00′05″N 59°45′27″E

Kalat-e Naderi (Persian: کلات نادری) is a massive natural fortress located about 44 miles north of Sousia, in Kalat County, Razavi Khorasan Province, Iran.

...I visited the extraordinary natural fortress of Kalat-i-nadiri and climbed its northern wall, which is one of the mountains in this range. From the crest I looked across the yellow plain, stretching northwards in level monotony, and was struck by its immensity....

— Percy Sykes, A History of Persia, 1921

It is essentially a massive plateau about four miles in circumference that has been used as a fortress since before the Achaemenid era. It is surrounded on three sides by high cliff walls ranging from 1500 feet on the south side to 2000 feet on the west side with lower eastern walls and a gently sloping plain leading up to the heights from the north.

It is famous as the only fortress ever to withstand a siege by Tamerlane.

Alexander the Great's army laid siege to it. While Alexander left to deal with a rebellious Persian chieftain, he ordered Craterus to command the majority of the army and take the fortress.

Some of the first European travellers to travel there include Sir John McNeill and Colonel Beake (brother of Charles Tilstone Beke). It was more fully described by William Gill, after his expedition with Valentine Baker in 1873:

Kila't is one of the most remarkable places in the world; it is a natural fortress, and if anything in the world can be impregnable it is certainly Kila't. The description of the Happy Valley in the romance of "Rasselas" might almost be taken for it. It is a large valley, surrounded on all sides by mountains absolutely inaccessible from the outside. [...] The inhabitants have their herds, and cultivate their corn, all in the valley, and consequently they could not be starved out.

== See also ==
- Kalat, Razavi Khorasan.
- Khanate of Kalat
