= Mohammad Taqi Sepehr =

Iranian court historian and littérateur (1801–1880)

Mirza Mohammad Taqi Sepehr
- میرزا محمدتقی سپهر
- Born: 1801; Kashan, Qajar Iran
- Died: March 1880 (aged 78–79)
- Relatives: Abbas-Qoli (son); Abd-ol-Hoseyn Malek ol-Movarrekhin (grandson)
- Writing career
- Pen name: Sepehr
- Notable work: Nasekh-ol-tavarikh-e salatin-e Qajariyeh

Mirza Mohammad Taqi Sepehr (Persian: میرزا محمدتقی سپهر), also known as Mirza Mohammad Taqi Kashani, or with the honorific Lesan ol-Molk (lit. 'The Tongue of the Kingdom/Country'; 1801–1880), was an Iranian court historian and littérateur of the Qajar era. He wrote with the pen name Sepehr ("celestial sphere"), and is known for authoring the lengthy Persian chronicle Nasekh ol-tavarikh-e salatin-e Qajariyeh ("The Abrogator of Histories: On Qajar Rulers"), also simply known as the Nasekh ol-tavarikh.

== Biography ==
Sepehr was born in 1801 in Kashan and enjoyed a studious youth. He eventually settled in the capital of Tehran in his younger years and became a protegé of the artist and writer Fath-Ali Khan Saba, who likewise originated from Kashan. When Qajar shah Mohammad Shah (r. 1834-1848) ascended the throne in 1834, Sepehr was appointed his private panegyrist, as well as secretary and accountant in the Iranian treasury (monshi va mostowfi-e divan). In 1853 Naser al-Din Shah gave him the honorary title "Lesan ol-Molk", which translates as "The Tongue of the Kingdom/Country".

Sepehr died in March 1880. He was the grandfather of the historian Abd-ol-Hoseyn Malek ol-Movarrekhin.

== Works and writing style ==
He wrote with the pen name (takhallos) "Sepehr", which translates as "celestial sphere".

Sepehr completed the Barahin ol-Ajam in 1835; the work deals with Persian prosody and is exemplified by examples from the medieval Persian poets. Several years later, in 1842, on the order of Mohammad Shah Qajar, Sepehr started writing the Persian chronicle Nasekh-ol-tavarikh-e salatin-e Qajariyeh ("The Abrogator of Histories: On Qajar Rulers"), also simply known as the Nasekh ol-tavarikh. The greatest part of his chronicle is dedicated to tracing Iran's national identity in the story of Shi'ism. The part covering early Islamic history was written by Sepehr's son Abbas-Qoli, while he himself authored the part concerning his patrons, i.e. the Qajars. This part on the Qajars is viewed as the only significant and noteworthy part of the chronicle, and covers up to 1857.

As part of his religious side, the work was patronized by Mohammad Shah Qajar's son and successor Naser al-Din Shah Qajar (r. 1848-1896), who consciously put efforts into nurturing a sense of national identity based on monarchical continuity, with himself being the political representative of the Twelfth Imam. This side was complemented by Naser al-Din Shah's cherishing of a literary Iranian historical consciousness.

Early writers on Bábi history, such as Arthur de Gobineau, Alexander Kasimovich Kazembek and Edward Granville Browne heavily relied on Sepehr's chronicle, with Browne applauding Sepehr's truthfulness and precision. However, Sepehr's chronicle generally depicts the Bábi's very negatively.

De Gobineau, who had met Sepehr during his stay in Iran, spoke of Sepehr's scholarly and administrative seriousness, in contrast to that of his compatriot Reza-Qoli Khan Hedayat, whose writings de Gobineau described as being composed in a light and laughing manner. Sepehr's verses can be found in anthologies, including the Majma al-fusaha of Hedayat. These verses of Sepehr display technical skill, however they lack freshness and taste.

== Sources ==
- Amanat, Abbas (1997). Pivot of the Universe: Nasir al-Din Shah Qajar and the Iranian Monarchy, 1831-1896. University of California Press.
- Amanat, Mehrdad (2018). "KASHAN iii. History to the Pahlavi Period". In Yarshater, Ehsan (ed.). Encyclopædia Iranica (Online ed.). Encyclopædia Iranica Foundation.
- Ghaemmaghami, Omid (2014). "To the Abode of the Hidden One: The Green Isle in Shīʽī, early Shaykhī, and Bābī-Bahā'ī Sacred Topography". In Mir-Kasimov, Orkhan (ed.). Unity in Diversity: Mysticism, Messianism and the Construction of Religious Authority in Islam. Brill.
- Gheissari, Ali (1998). Iranian Intellectuals in the Twentieth Century. University of Texas Press.
- Marcinkowski, M. Ismail (2003). Persian Historiography and Geography: Bertold Spuler on Major Works Produced in Iran, the Caucasus, Central Asia, India, and Early Ottoman Turkey. Pustaka Nasional Pte Ltd.
- Minorsky, V. (1997). "Sipihr". In Bosworth, C. E.; van Donzel, E.; Heinrichs, W. P. & Lecomte, G. (eds.). The Encyclopaedia of Islam, Second Edition. Volume IX: San–Sze. Leiden: E. J. Brill. ISBN 978-90-04-10422-8.
- Mirzai, Behnaz A. (2017). A History of Slavery and Emancipation in Iran, 1800-1929. University of Texas Press.
- Rypka, Jan (1968). History of Iranian Literature. D. Reidel Publishing Company.
- Vejdani, Farzin (2015). Making History in Iran: Education, Nationalism, and Print Culture. Stanford University Press.
