= Reza-Qoli Khan Hedayat =

Iranian politician 1800–1871

- رضاقلی‌خان هدایت
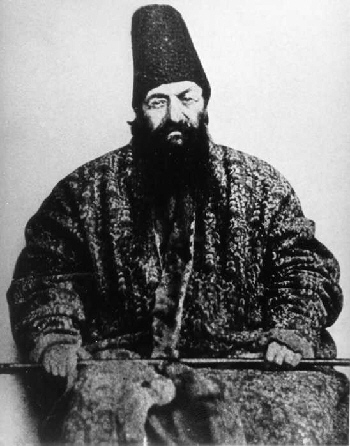
- Portrait of Reza-Qoli Khan Hedayat

Ambassador of Iran to Khiva
- In office 1851

Personal details
- Born: 8 June 1800 Tehran, Qajar Iran
- Died: 29 June 1871 (aged 71) Tehran, Qajar Iran
- Parent: Mohammad-Hadi Khan (father)
- Relatives: Sadegh Hedayat (great-great grandson)

Reza-Qoli Khan Hedayat (Persian: رضاقلی‌خان هدایت; 8 June 1800 – 29 June 1871) was a Qajar era Iranian literary historian, administrator, and poet.

== Biography ==
Hedayat was born in Tehran on 8 June 1800 to a renowned family which was descended from the prominent 14th-century lyric-poet Kamal Khujandi. In his autobiographical work, Hedayat sometimes referred to himself as "Hedayat Mazan-darani", "Tabari", or "Tabarestani" due to his father Mohammad-Hadi Khan having served the Qajar tribal leaders in Mazandaran. Mohamad-Hadi Khan oversaw the finances and employees of the Qajar household under Agha Mohammad Khan Qajar. Under Fath-Ali Shah Qajar, he served as a provincial administrator in Khorasan and later Shiraz. He died in 1803, While working for the Qajar prince Hossein Ali Mirza as a treasurer. Upon the completion of his education, Reza-Qoli Khan entered the service of Hossein Ali Mirza son of Fath Ali Shah and governor of Shiraz. He was given the title of Khan and of Amir-ol Sho'ara in 1830, when Fath Ali Shah visited Shiraz.

In 1838 he came back to Tehran. Mohammad Shah Qajar instructed him to remain at the court and in 1841 selected him as tutor to his son Prince Abbas Mirza Molk Ara. In 1847 he was appointed governor of Firuzkuh.

=== Mission to Khiva ===
In 1851, he was chosen by Naser al-Din Shah Qajar to lead the Embassy to Khiva. Relations between Iran and Khwarazm were at this time strained by mutual distrust, the Khan of Khiva having been accused of supporting the Salar Revolt and conducting raids on Northern Khorasan some years prior.

He was minister of education in 1852 and principal of the newly founded Dar-ol-fonoon College at Tehran.

In 1857, he was selected as tutor of Mozaffar ad-Din Shah Qajar.

He died from a severe illness in 1871. He had two sons, Ali Qoli Khan Mokhber ed-Dowleh and Ja'afar Qoli Khan Nayer-ol-Molk. Reza Qoli Khan was a great-grandfather of Sadegh Hedayat.

== Works ==
- Farhang-e anjomanārā-ye nāṣeri (a Persian dictionary)
- Madārej al-balāḡa dar ʿElm-e Badiʿ (on Persian rhetoric)
- Majmaʿ al-foṣaḥā ("The meeting place of the eloquent")
- Rawżat al-ṣafā-ye nāṣeri
- Riāż al-ʿārefin ("The gardens of the Mystics")
- Tārix-e Rawżat al-ṣafā-ye nāṣeri (on history)

He also wrote a Divan containing 50,000 distichs and six Mathnawis.

== Sources ==
- Losensky, Paul E. (2003). "Hedayat, Reżāqoli Khan". In Yarshater, Ehsan (ed.). Encyclopædia Iranica. Vol. XII/2: Hedāyat al-mota'allemin–Herat VII. London and New York: Routledge & Kegan Paul. pp. 119–121. ISBN 978-0-933273-75-7.
