= Asef al-Dowleh =

Prime Minister of Qajar Iran from 1824 to 1828

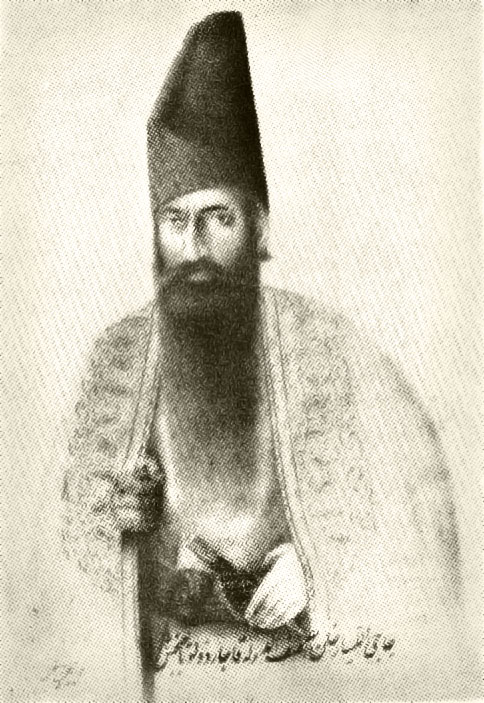
- Portrait of Asef al-Dowleh

Prime Minister of Qajar Iran
- In office 1824–1828
- Monarch: Fath-Ali Shah Qajar
- Preceded by: Abdollah Khan Amin ol-Dowleh
- Succeeded by: Abdollah Khan Amin ol-Dowleh

Personal details
- Relations: Galin Khanum (sister)
- Children: Hasan Khan Salar; Mirza Mohammad Khan Beglerbegi
- Parent: Mohammad Khan Devellu-Qajar (father)
- Tribe: Qajar
- Branch: Devellu

Allahyar Khan Devellu-Qajar Asef al-Dowleh (Persian: الله‌یارخان آصف‌الدوله) was the prime minister of Iran under Fath-Ali Shah Qajar (r. 1797–1834) from 1824 to 1828.

Asef al-Dowleh was a hardline proponent of intensifying the Russo-Iranian War of 1826–1828, performed ineffectively on the battlefield, and was among the first to evacuate to the city of Tabriz. When the Russians captured Tabriz without an opposition, he was in charge of the men in the city's fortress. He was as a result placed under detention in his own house, and after being freed, so deeply outraged was Fath-Ali Shah at Asef al-Dowleh's conduct that he ordered that Asef al-Dowleh be publicly flogged for his "cowardly behavior". Asef al-Dowleh played a key role in inciting the population to oppose the Russian diplomat Alexander Griboyedov, which led to the massacre at the Russian Embassy in Tehran in 1829.

== Background ==
Asef al-Dowleh was the eldest son of Mohammad Khan Devellu-Qajar (also known as Rokn al-Dowleh). He belonged to the Devellu branch of the Qajar tribe, which had established their rule over Iran under Agha Mohammad Khan Qajar (r. 1789–1797). After Agha Mohammad Khan's murder in 1797, Asef al-Dowleh's father was crucial in ensuring that the capital of Tehran was secure in time for the arrival of Fath-Ali Shah Qajar (r. 1797–1834).

== Term as prime minister ==
In 1824, Fath-Ali Shah appointed Asef al-Dowleh as his prime minister. In early 1825, the northern bank of Lake Gokcha, which the Iranians believed to be a part of their realm, was seized by the Russians under the orders of Aleksey Petrovich Yermolov, the governor of Georgia. The Russian army soon advanced further, capturing Balagh-lu as well. The Iranians knew that these locations might be used as a staging ground for an attack on Erivan, therefore the significance of this went far beyond the sites themselves. Although Yermolov conceded that this was Iranian territory, he defended his action by claiming that Iran was clinging to a large portion of Karabakh. The Russians also constructed a small fort on the frontier with Erivan, which the Qajar crown prince Abbas Mirza protested against.

In Fath-Ali Shah's court, two factions had developed during the course of building policy toward Russia. One faction advocated for peace with Russia, and the other for war. Both were heavily lobbying Fath-Ali Shah and Abbas Mirza. The first question at hand was what to do if Russia did not stop their occupation of Gokcha and Balagh-lu. The state of the Muslim minority under Russian authority and, lastly, whether and to what extent Russia had been weakened as a result of its internal crises, were secondary concerns.

Those who advocated for peace were the foreign minister Mirza Abolhassan Khan Ilchi; the chief scribe Neshat Esfahani; the head of the royal office Manuchehr Khan Gorji; and the court translator and envoy Mirza Saleh Shirazi. In general, the peace party feared the capability of the Russian Empire and wanted armed conflict to be avoided at all costs. They were more accustomed to dealing with people from other cultures and knew more about Russia.

Those who advocated for war were several prominent Islamic scholars led by Agha Sayyed Mohammad Esfahani; Asef al-Dowleh; Abbas Mirza's close advisor Abol-Qasem Qa'em-Maqam II; and some of the exiled khans of the Caucasus, who had either been driven away by the Treaty of Gulistan or had fled to Iran after the treaty. The main stance of the war party was that the Russians had clearly insulted the Iranians and been aggressive towards them. Agha Sayyed Mohammad, who was on his way to meet Fath-Ali Shah, mentioned Fath-Ali Shah's responsibilities "both as Sovereign of Persia, and as the head of the Mohamedian faith" in a letter to Fath-Ali Shah. Agha Sayyed Mohammad also brought up the Russian annexation of Iranian territory and the treatment of Muslims. Furthermore, the war party's interpretation of Russian events was more optimistic than realistic, arguing that Russia was weak overall, especially in the Caucasus due to Yermolov's recent defeats and the Decembrist revolt.

To advise Fath-Ali Shah and formulate a course of action in this matter, the Council of Soltaniyeh gathered. The peace party at Fath-Ali Shah's court was ultimately outmanoeuvred and the final decision was to launch full-scale warfare against the Russians. Asef al-Dowleh performed ineffectively on the battlefield, and was among the first to evacuate to the city of Tabriz. When the Russians captured Tabriz without an opposition, he was in charge of the men in the city's fortress. He was as a result placed under detention in his own house, and after being freed, Fath-Ali Shah ordered that he be publicly flogged for his "cowardly behavior".

== Later career ==
In 1829, the distinguished Russian poet and author Alexander Griboyedov led a sizable Russian embassy to Tehran. There Griboyedov showed the condescending behaviour of a conqueror toward the Iranians when enforcing the conditions of the Treaty of Turkmenchay. Griboyedov ordered that the Georgian concubines who were held in the harems of the Qajars (including Asef al-Dowleh's) be released into his care. He had done this at the urging of an Armenian eunuch who was himself a prisoner from earlier Iranian expeditions into the Caucasus. Griboyedov dispatched his Armenian and Georgian assistants to deliver the Georgian concubines to the Russian embassy, relying on a clause in the Treaty of Turkmenchay that called for the trading of prisoners of war.

Such a transgression of the law and Shia religious practices was viewed as having significant symbolic significance. Asef al-Dowleh asked for the help of the local Islamic scholar Mirza Masih Tehrani, who as a result urged the citizens of the capital to rise up, rescue the concubines, who had probably now converted to Islam, and bring them back to their Muslim homes. Three protesters lost their lives in the ensuing fights with the Russian security forces. Mirza Masih Tehrani then issued a fatwa, which led to the slaughter of Griboyedov and all but one of the seventy-person personnel of the Russian embassy by an enraged crowd.

== Sources ==
- Aktin, Muriel (2018). "The Early Stages of Russo–Iranian Relations". In Matthee, Rudi; Andreeva, Elena (eds.). Russians in Iran: Diplomacy and Power in the Qajar Era and Beyond. I.B. Tauris. pp. 11–23. ISBN 978-1-78673-336-8.
- Amanat, Abbas (1997). Pivot of the Universe: Nasir Al-Din Shah Qajar and the Iranian Monarchy, 1831-1896. I.B.Tauris. ISBN 978-1845118280.
- Amanat, Abbas (2017). Iran: A Modern History. Yale University Press. ISBN 978-0300112542.
- Behrooz, Maziar (2023). Iran at War: Interactions with the Modern World and the Struggle with Imperial Russia. I.B. Tauris. ISBN 978-0755637379.
- Perry, John R. (2012). "Āghā Muḥammad Qājār". In Fleet, Kate; Krämer, Gudrun; Matringe, Denis; Nawas, John; Rowson, Everett (eds.). Encyclopaedia of Islam (3rd ed.). Brill Online. ISSN 1873-9830.
- Pourjavady, Reza (2023). "Russo-Iranian wars 1804-13 and 1826-8". Christian-Muslim Relations. A Bibliographical History Volume 20. Iran, Afghanistan and the Caucasus (1800-1914). Brill.
