= Hasan Khan Salar =

Iranian prince (d. 1850)

- Governor of Khorasan
- Died: 1850
- Noble family: Qajar dynasty
- Father: Allahyar Khan Asef ad-Dowleh

Hasan Khan Salar (Persian: حسن خان سالار, died 1850) was a Qajar prince most notable for his rebellion and support for Bahman Mirza's claim to the Iranian throne. He was the fifth son of the Qajar chief minister Asef al-Dowleh and the oldest son of Maryam Khanom, the fifth daughter of Fath-Ali Shah Qajar. Therefore, he was a cousin of the incumbent Shah of his time, Mohammad Shah Qajar.

== Rise to power ==
Hasan Khan Salar rose to power after his father Asef ad-Dowleh, former governor of Khorasan province, was exiled for rebellion.

== Rebellion ==
During his time as the governor of Khorasan, Salar supported Bahman Mirza for the throne of Iran, and took up arms against Mohammad Shah Qajar and later his son, Naser al-Din Shah Qajar, starting a rebellion that would last from 1846 to 1850. His revolt was eventually defeated during the prime ministry of Amir Kabir. Salar, his son Amir Aslan Khan, and his brother were executed afterwards in an unusually harsh punishment that demonstrated Amir Kabir's determination to exert control over the region.
