= Hasan-Ali Khan Amir Nezam Garrusi =

Iranian officer, statesman, and writer (1820–1900)

Amir Nezam Hasan-Ali Khan Garrusi
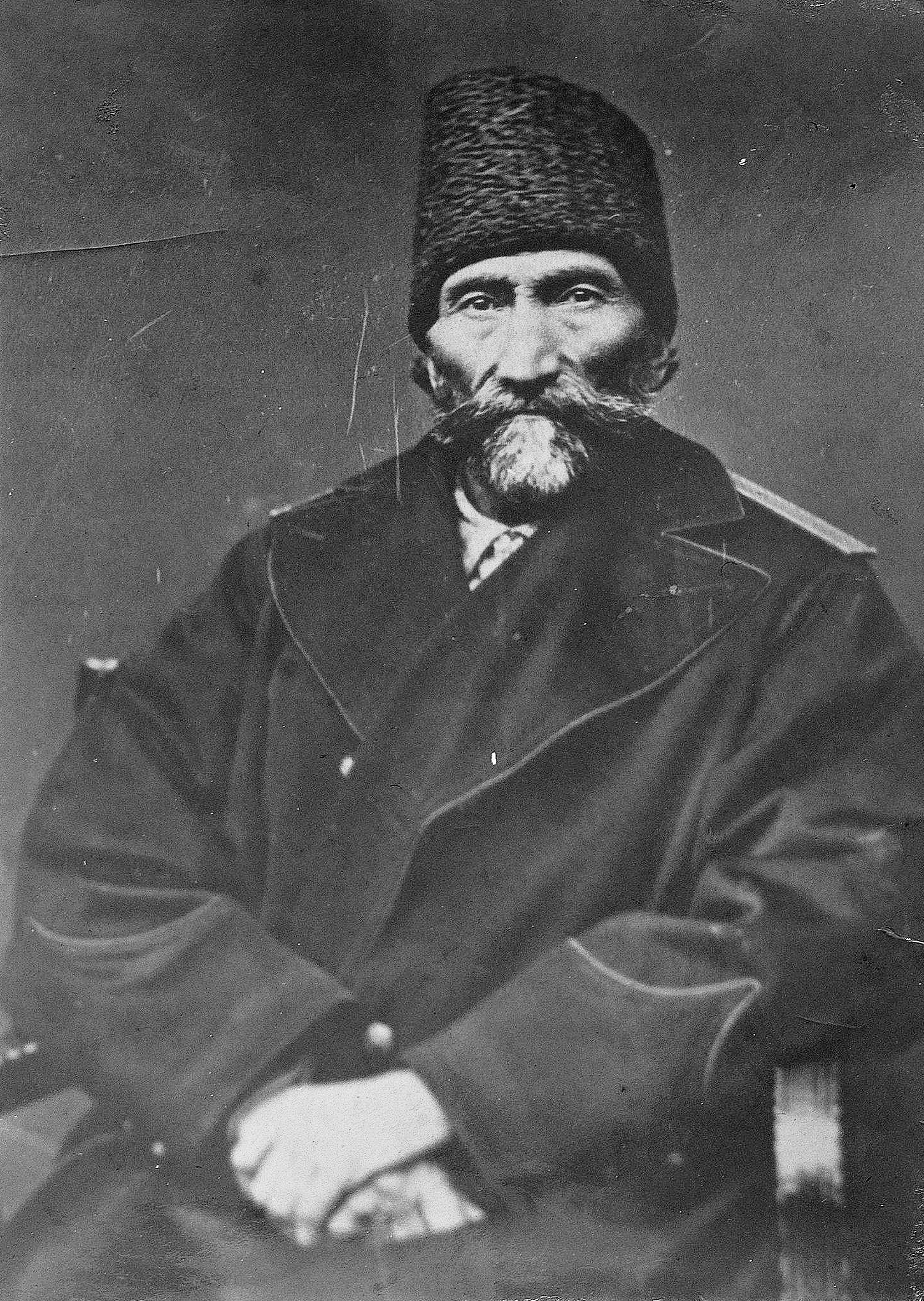
- Photograph of Hasan-Ali Khan Amir Nezam Garrusi, dated 1881
- Born: 1820; Garrus, Qajar Iran
- Died: January 1900 (aged 79–80)
- Burial place: Shah Nematollah Vali Shrine, Mahan
- Occupations: Officer, diplomat, statesman, and writer
- Relatives: Mohammad-Sadeq Khan (father)
- Military career
- Allegiance: Qajar Iran
- Branch: (Qajar Iran) Qajar Army
- Conflicts: First Herat War; Second Herat War; Siege of Ghurian

Hasan-Ali Khan Amir Nezam Garrusi (Persian: حسنعلی‌خان امیر‌نظام گروسی; 1820–1900), was an Iranian officer, diplomat, statesman, and writer of the Qajar period. A member of the Kurdish Kabudvand tribe, he came from a family with a long history of government service.

== Biography ==
A member of the Kurdish Kabudvand tribe, Hasan-Ali was born in 1820 in Garrus (present-day Bijar). For a long time, his family had occupied positions within the government. His father Mohammad-Sadeq Khan was the governor of Garrus. His mother was a former concubine given to his father by Fath-Ali Shah Qajar as a reward. His father and grandfather were part of the court of Crown Prince Abbas Mirza in Tabriz, which was influenced by the literary network of Abol-Qasem Qa'em-Maqam. This influence may have been the reason behind Hasan-Ali's education. His studies, which included Arabic and Persian literature, history, calligraphy, and possibly theology, were unusually extensive for a man of his origin.

As part of the Garrus regiment, Hasan Ali participated in the Herat campaign of 1837/38 and was later assigned to the Tabriz garrison and to pacify the Kermanshah region in 1841/42. He was then summoned to the capital and chose to leave Bijar for the Shah Abdol-Azim Shrine near Tehran following the suspicious death of his father. He was charged with patricide but the accession of Naser al-Din Shah Qajar to the throne opened new opportunities for Hasan Ali who was reinstated as commander of the Garrus regiment. He went on to become an important figure in quelling riots against the central government including the Salar revolt between 1847 and 1851.

He died in January 1900. He was buried in the Shah Nematollah Vali Shrine in Mahan.

== See also ==
- Amir Nezam House
