= Herat Question =

19th-century geopolitical dispute in Afghanistan

The Herat Question (Persian: مسئله هرات, Mas'ale-ye Herāt) was a major 19th-century geopolitical dispute concerning the sovereignty of the Emirate of Herat. The conflict was evoked by Qajar Iran, which sought to re-establish Iran's historical control over Greater Khorasan. The dispute comprised numerous successful invasions by Qajar Iran, under which the Siege of Herat (1833) and the First (1837–1838) and Second Herat War (1856) occurred. The British participated in the conflict in 1856 as a result of the Second Herat War, seeking to end the emirate's complete annexation by Iranian prince-governor Morad Mirza Hesam o-Saltaneh's. Following Iran's defeat in the Anglo-Persian War (1856-1857), Iranian hostilies ended and Herat gained its independence, paving the way for its final defeat against Dost Mohammad Khan in the Herat campaign of 1862–1863, thus becoming part of Afghanistan.

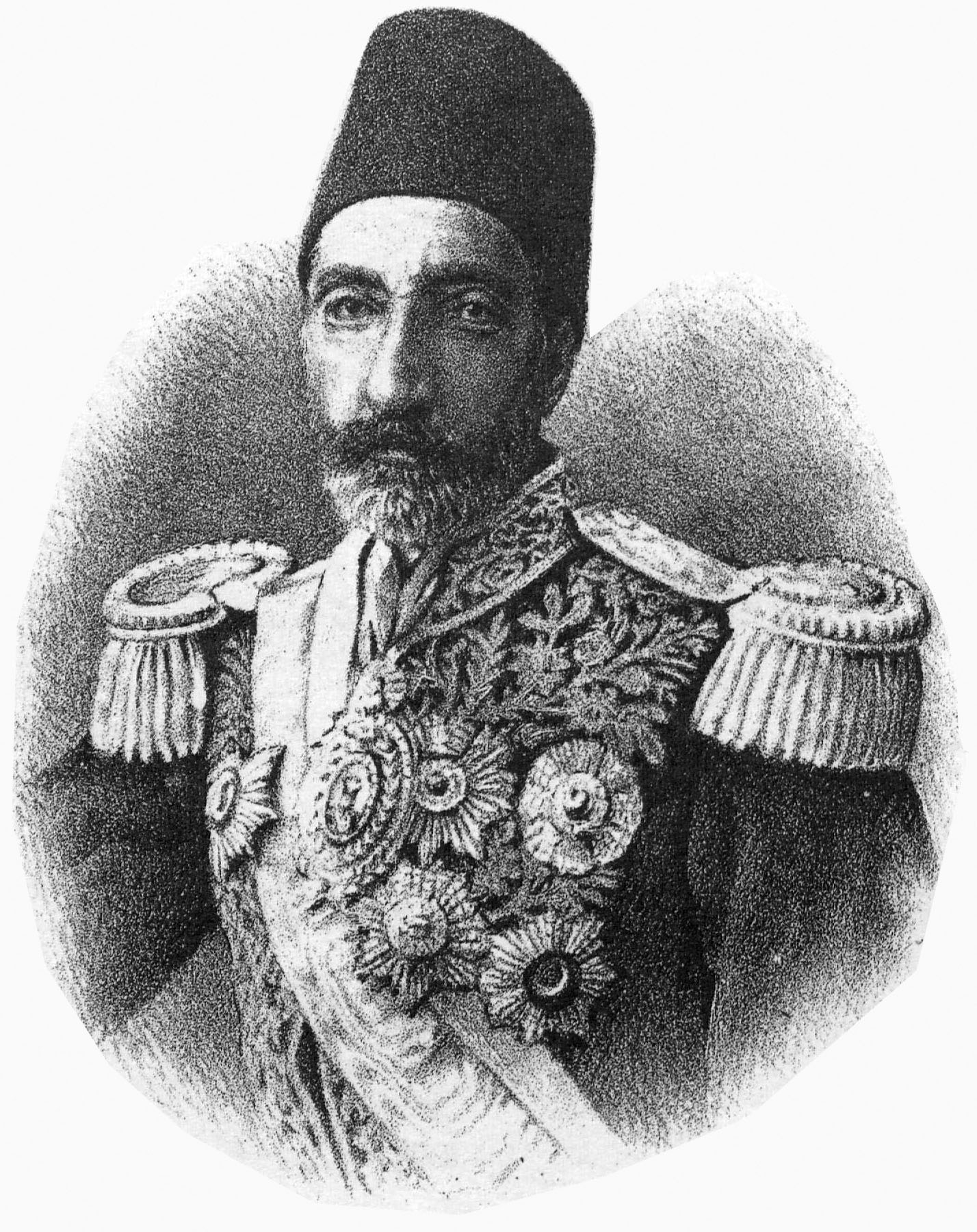
Prince-governor Morad Mirza Hesam o-Saltaneh introduced the term "The Herat Question".

The dispute developed in the middle of the 18th century, when, following Nader Shah’s assassination in 1747, Herat separated from Afsharid Iran and became part of the Afghan Durrani Empire. During the 18th century there was yet no conflict, since both Zand Iran as Afsharid Iran had no intentions in reconquering Herat, nor did they have the means to accomplish it. Only since the Qajar dynasty came to power in the 1790s, attempts were made to annex Herat.

The British were deeply concerned that Iran's control over Herat would serve as a springboard for Russian expansion. Iran's occupation of Herat would grant Russia significant influence or a direct military corridor toward the frontiers of the British Raj, potentially destabilizing British rule in the subcontinent. Iran's victory in the Second Herat War therefore triggered the British into a confrontation with Iran, resulting in the Anglo-Persian War (1856-1857).
