= Izydor Borowski =

Polish general of the Iranian army (c. 1770–1838)

- Born: c. 1770; Vilnius, Polish–Lithuanian Commonwealth
- Died: 24 June 1838 Herat, (present-day Afghanistan)
- Buried: New Julfa Armenian Cemetery, Isfahan
- Allegiance: Poland–Lithuania; French Empire; Venezuela; Qajar Iran
- Service years: 1794–1838
- Rank: General
- Conflicts: Kościuszko Uprising; Haitian Revolution; Spanish American wars of independence; Crossing of the Andes; Bolívar's campaign to New Granada; Battle of Boyacá; Battle of Carabobo; First Herat War; Siege of Herat (1837–1838) †

Izydor Borowski (c. 1770 – 24 June 1838; Persian: ایزیدر بروسکی, romanized: Ayzydr Brvsky), also spelled Isidor Borowski, was a general in Qajar Iran of Polish origin. He is noted for his instrumental role in the modernization of the army.

== Early life ==
Borowski was born in Vilnius (present-day Lithuania) in the Polish–Lithuanian Commonwealth, at the time a shadow of its former self. According to the Jewish Encyclopedia, Borowski gave varying accounts of his parentage, professing to be the illegitimate son of Prince Radziwill and a Jewish woman, or the son of a Jewish mother and a Polish nobleman. There is a possibility that his brother was the literary historian Leon Borowski (1784–1846). Sources on his early life are inconsistent. According to Encyclopædia Iranica, he had to flee to England either "presumably" during the Third Partition of Poland (1795), or that he departed from Poland in 1793, which however is inconsistent with Alma Mater, an academic publication produced by Jagiellonian University, which states that he participated in the Kościuszko Uprising of 1794, afterwards returning home.

== Military career ==
According to Encyclopædia Iranica, after arriving in England, he later served abroad in South Africa and British India. According to Alma Mater, which does not contain any reference to his travels to England, Africa or India, in 1797 he joined the Polish Legions in Italy, and was part of the Polish contingent sent to quell the Haitian Revolution in 1802. Like many Poles who disliked quelling an independence movement, he then deserted the French side, and he himself joined the buccaneer organization Brethren of the Coast.

Around 1805–1806 he joined a group of mercenaries freedom fighters recruited by Francisco de Miranda in a failed attempt to liberate Venezuela from Spanish rule. Around 1810 he became one of the trusted lieutenants and later an adjutant of Simón Bolívar. He was one of Bolivar's commanders during the campaign to liberate New Granada of 1819–1820, distinguishing himself in the Crossing of the Andes and the Battle of Boyacá, and in 1821, at the Battle of Carabobo. Following the establishment of Gran Colombia, he lived in Bogotá for at least two years, but political intrigues resulted in his decision to leave South America. He visited the United States and then traveled to the Middle East, where he worked for Muhammad Ali of Egypt and taught mathematics and English.

Encyclopædia Iranica states that at an unspecified time he moved to Iran on the request of crown prince Abbas Mirza, and entered Iranian service. According to Alma Mater he advocated Iranian intervention in the November Uprising (1830–1831). He quickly became on good terms with both Fath Ali Shah Qajar (r. 1797–1834), as well as the crown prince himself. He successfully climbed the ranks and played a pivotal role in the modernization of the Iranian army. Later on, he was promoted to the rank of general. According to Alma Mater he received positions, titles or functions of a Vizier and Emir.

Borowski was then assigned to Abbas Mirza's son, Mohammad Mirza (later known by his regal name of Mohammad Shah Qajar), who was the commander-in-chief of the Iranian forces besieging Herat in 1833. Upon Abbas Mirza's death in late 1833, and that of his father Fath Ali Shah a year after, Borowski remained loyal to Mohammad Mirza, and joined him in the ensuing war of succession. Some time after, Borowski, Qahreman Mirza (another son of Abbas Mirza) and Masoud Mirza managed to defeat the Uzbek incursions as well as the rebelling Turkmens, both in Khorasan.

== Death and legacy ==
Borowski then served in the First Herat War (1837/38). According to Alma Mater, he was the commander-in-chief of the Iranian forces. Since the Iranian commanders were quarrelling among themselves and the Iranian army had low morale, Borowski took the lead in the field himself. The siege of Herat would be his last, for he was mortally wounded by a bullet to the abdomen, while personally leading an assault on the enemy fortifications. He died not long afterwards.

He was buried in the Armenian cemetery in New Julfa (the Armenian quarter of Isfahan). The French inscription on his grave gives 24 June 1838 as his date of death. After his death, a friend of Borowski in the Iranian army, an Italian named Barthelemy Semino, married his widow (an Armenian woman from New Julfa), and he reportedly took care of his children as well. According to the sources, Borowski is said to have made a "considerable" amount of wealth in the years he served in Iran. However, most of it apparently had gone missing around the time his testament was to be invoked, that testament being in the possession of Aleksander Chodźko, a "compatriot" of Borowski and Russian consul in Rasht.

According to Encyclopædia Iranica, Borowski was survived by his two sons. The first one, Stanislaw, would become a teacher at the Dar ul-Fonun school. He died in Tehran in 1898. Borowski's second son would enter the service of the Iranian government as well, but he committed suicide not long after. Alma Mater, however, mentions only Antoni Radziwiłł-Borowski, who also became a general in the Iranian service, and took part in the Second Herat War.

== Sources ==
- Cronin, Stephanie, ed. (2013). Armies and State Building in the Modern Middle East: Politics, Nationalism and Military Reform. I.B.Tauris. ISBN 978-1780767406.
- Rosenthal, Herman; Wiernik, Peter (1906). "BOROWSKI, ISIDOR". Jewish Encyclopedia.
- Suziedelis, Saulius A. (2011). Historical Dictionary of Lithuania (2 ed.). Scarecrow Press. ISBN 978-0810875364.
- Utas, Bo (2002). "BOROWSKY, ISIDORE". In Yarshater, Ehsan (ed.). Encyclopædia Iranica. Encyclopaedia Iranica (Online ed.). Encyclopædia Iranica Foundation.
