= New Julfa Armenian Cemetery =

Historic cemetery in Iran

Coordinates: 32.6138°N 51.6531°E

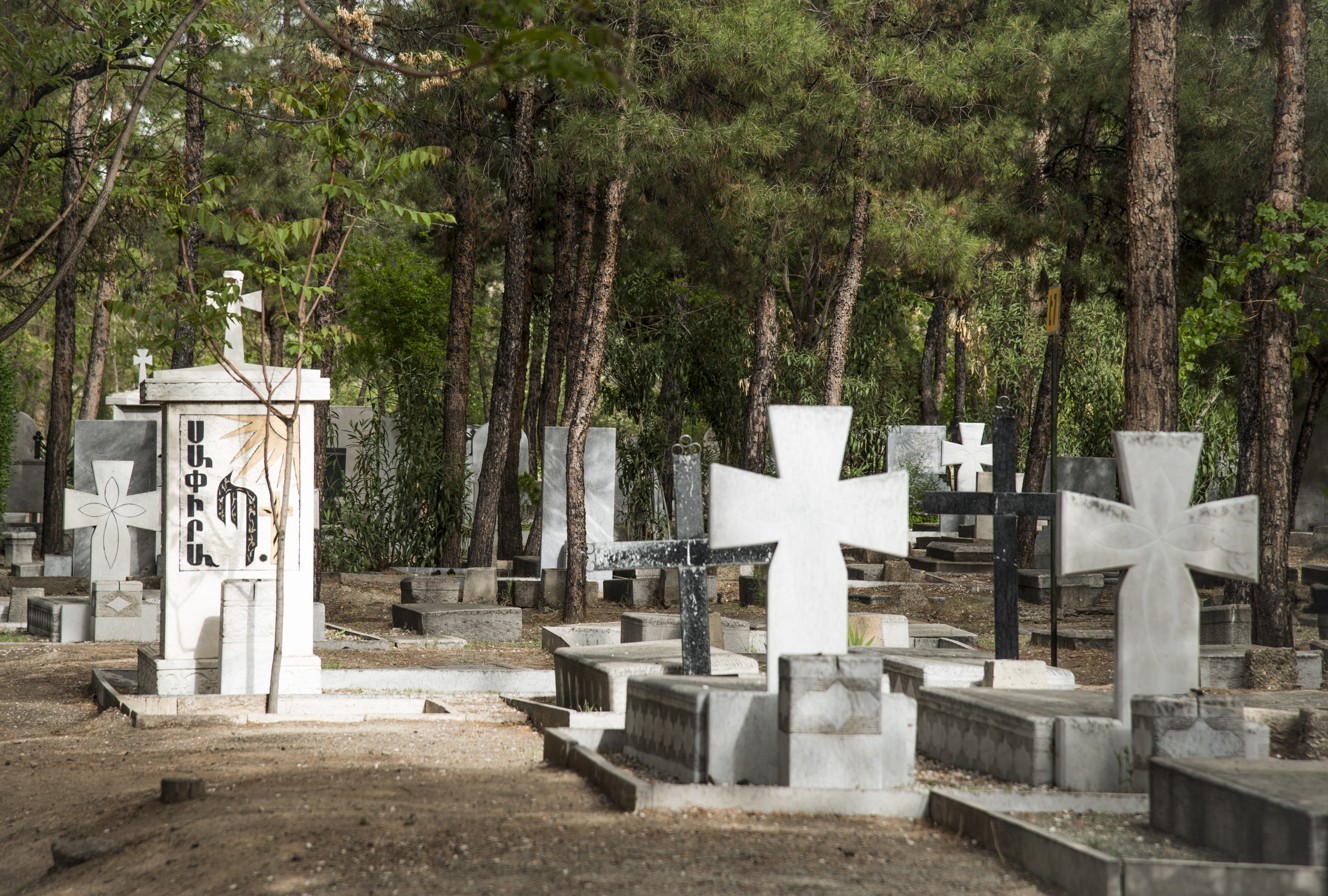
New graves at Cemetery

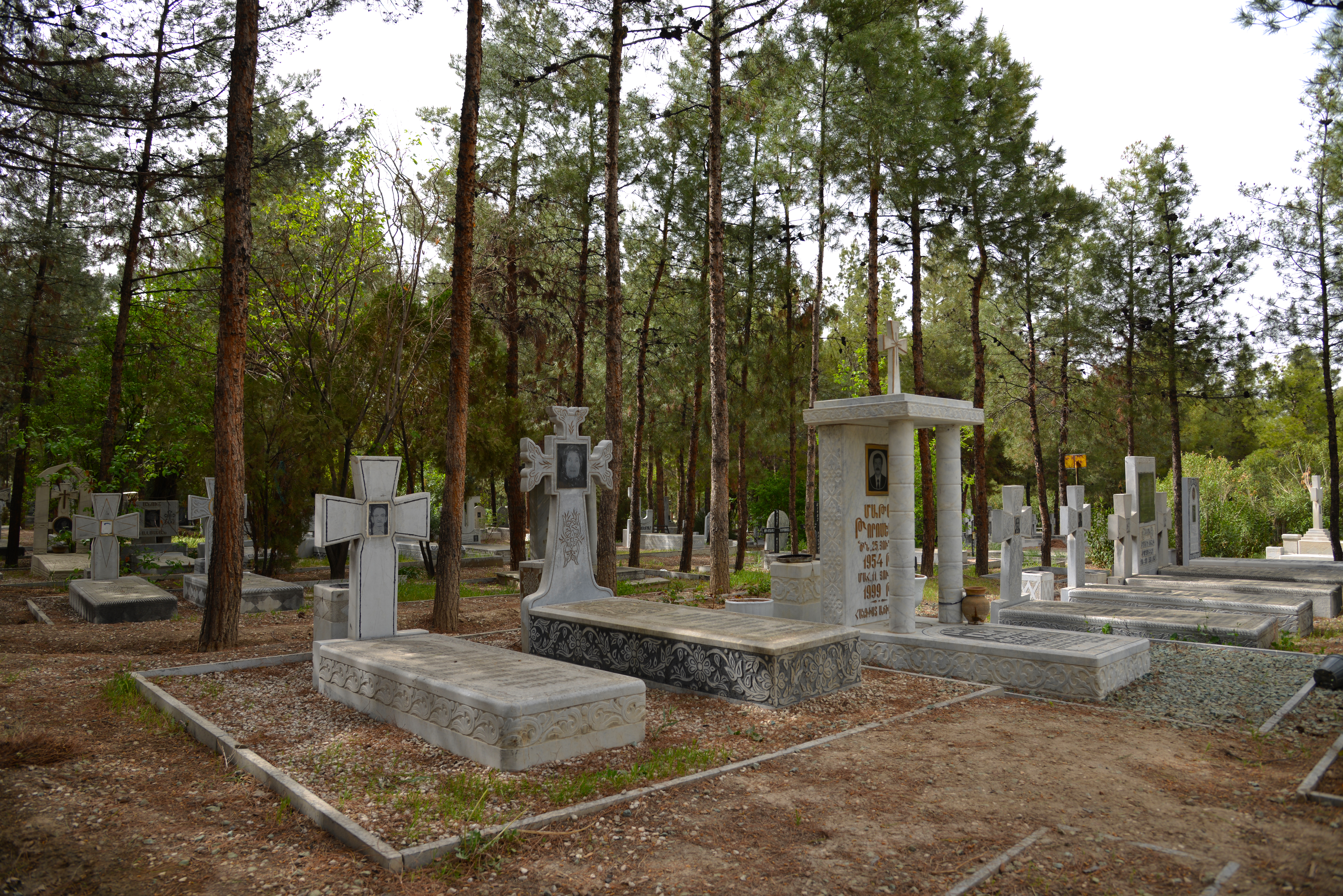
New graves at Cemetery

New Julfa Armenian Cemetery (Persian: آرامستان ارامنه اصفهان) is a historic cemetery near the New Julfa Armenian quarter of Isfahan, Iran.

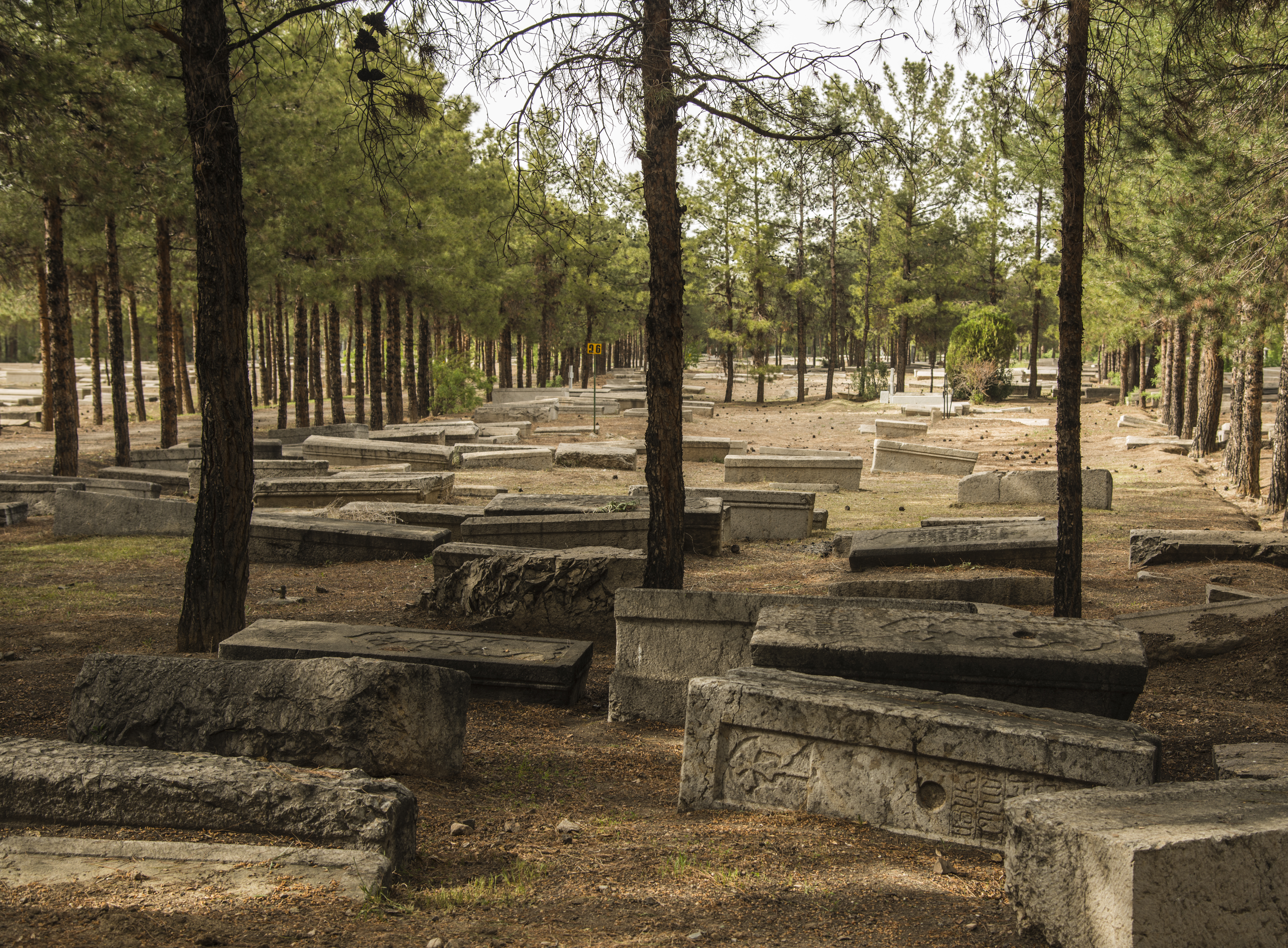
Old graves at Cemetery

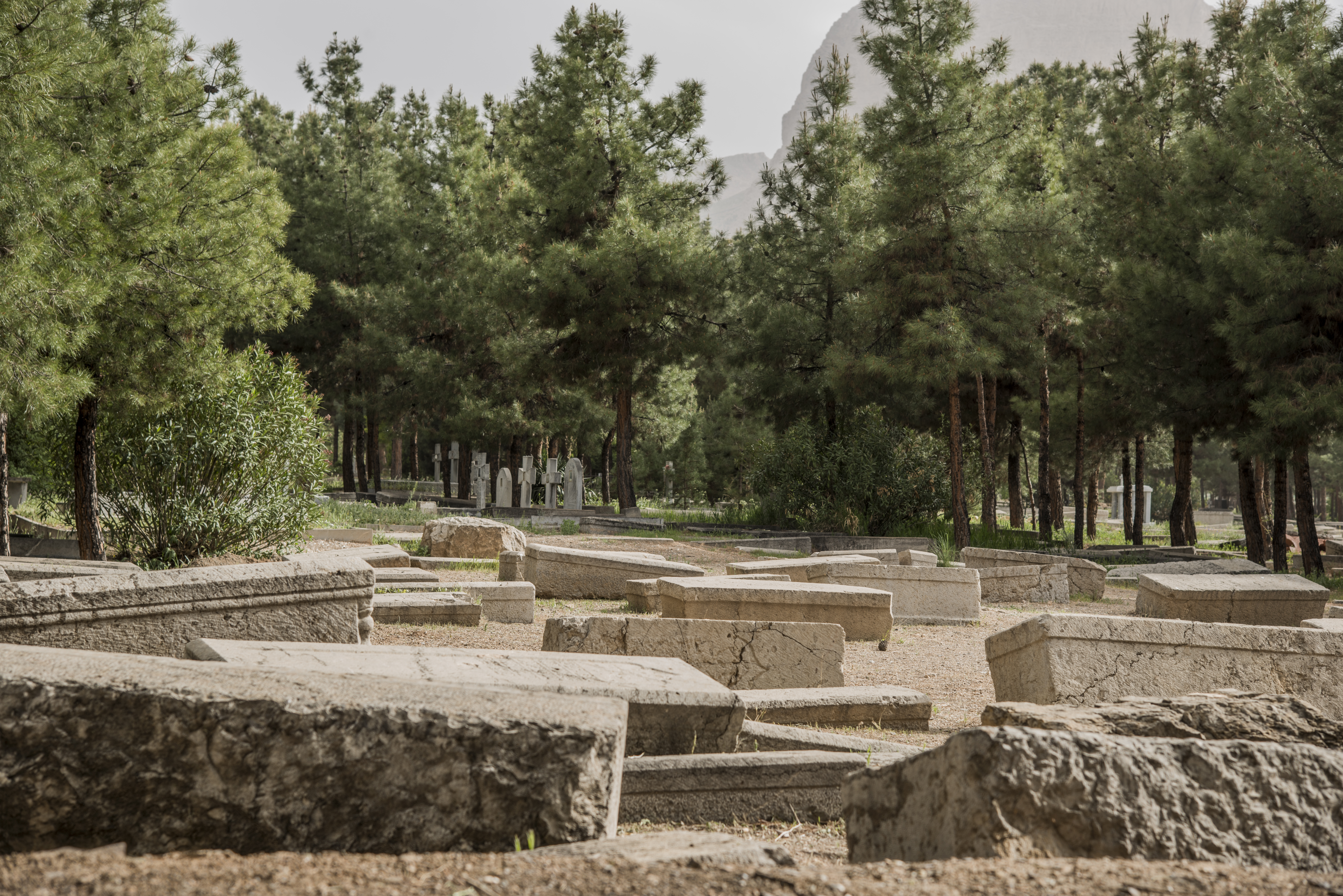
Old graves at Cemetery

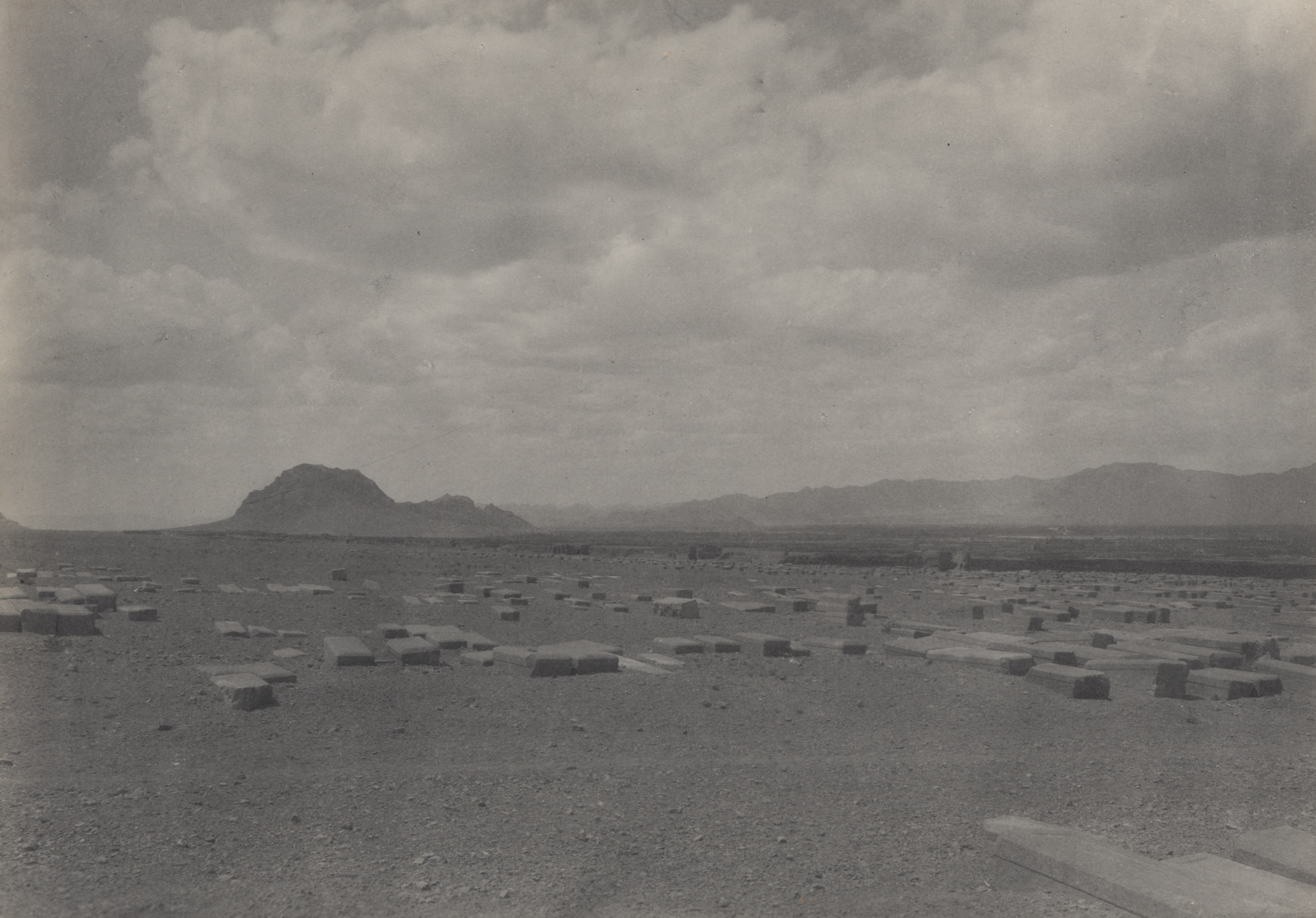
New Julfa Cemetery, 1891

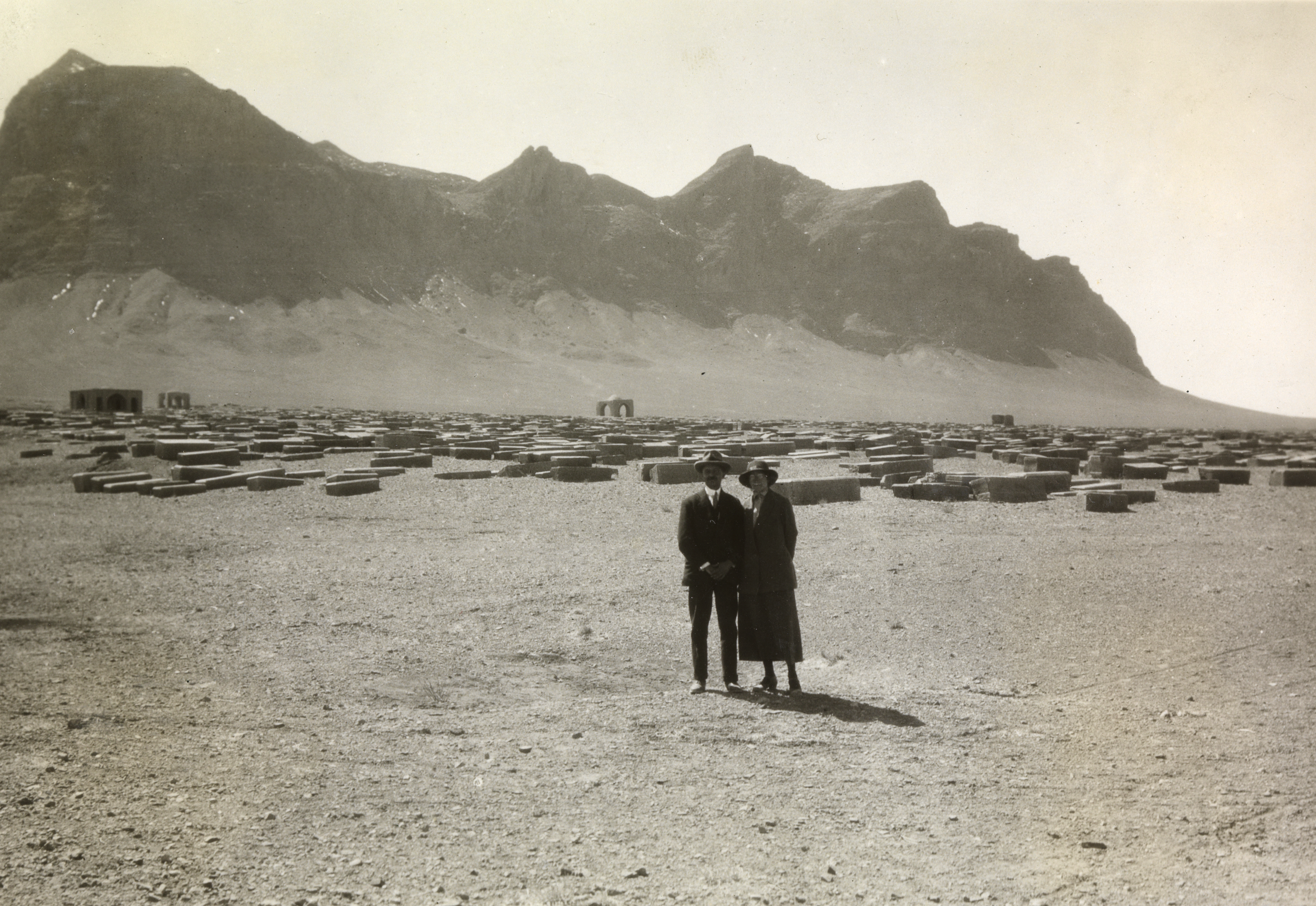
New Julfa Cemetery, 1924

== International interments ==
Among those interred here are:

- William Bell (1591–1624) – British factor of East India Company in Isfahan.
- Johann Rudolf Stadler (1605–1637) – Swiss watchmaker of Shah Safi who killed a man who had entered his house. He chose to be executed instead of conversion to Islam and died as a Christian martyr.
- Alexander de Rhodes (1591–1660) – French Jesuit missionary who had a lasting impact on Christianity in Viet Nam
- Francis Vernon (1637–1677) – English traveller
- Tadeusz Mironowicz (died 1686) – the legate of the King of Poland in Safavid court of Persia
- Members of De l'Estoile family
- Jacques Rousseau (1770–1838) – Genevan watchmaker and diplomat
- Isidore Borowsky (1770–1838) – general in Qajar Iran of Polish origin.
- Xavier Hommaire de Hell (1812–1848) – French geographer, engineer and traveller
- Edward Henry Philip Glover (1843–1898) – born in Lymington, Hampshire, England – Was founder of the Telegraph Office at Isfahan
- Ernst Hoeltzer (1835–1911) – German engineer and photographer
- Hovhannes Abkarian (یحیی تارساز/Հովհաննես Աբքարյան) (fa) (1875–1931) – musician
- Leslie Griffiths (1899–1942) – Australian missionary of Church Mission Society who was killed in Lorestan along with his 10-year-old son Ian and the British vice-consul in Isfahan, Robert Christopher Skipworth Harris (1907–1942) searching for the remains of a crashed military aircraft of Allied Forces in the mountains of Lorestan
- Ernst Jakob Christoffel (de) (1876–1955) – German Evangelical pastor who founded Christian Blind Mission and built homes for blind children, orphans, physically disabled, and deaf persons in Turkey (Sivas and Malatia) and Iran (Tabriz and New Julfa).
- Mateos Karakhanian (Մաթեոս Կարախանյան) (fa) (1860–1947) – photographer
- Yesayi Shahijanian (fa) (1939–1987) – painter
- Hrand Ghoukasian (fa) (1927–1996) – physician and translator
- Yervand Nahapetian (fa) (1916–2006) – painter
- Levon Minassian (Լեւոն Մինասեան) (hy) (1920–2012) – scholar
- Zaven Ghoukasian (Զաւէն Ղուկասյան) (fa) (1950–2015) – film director and critic

== Polish Section ==
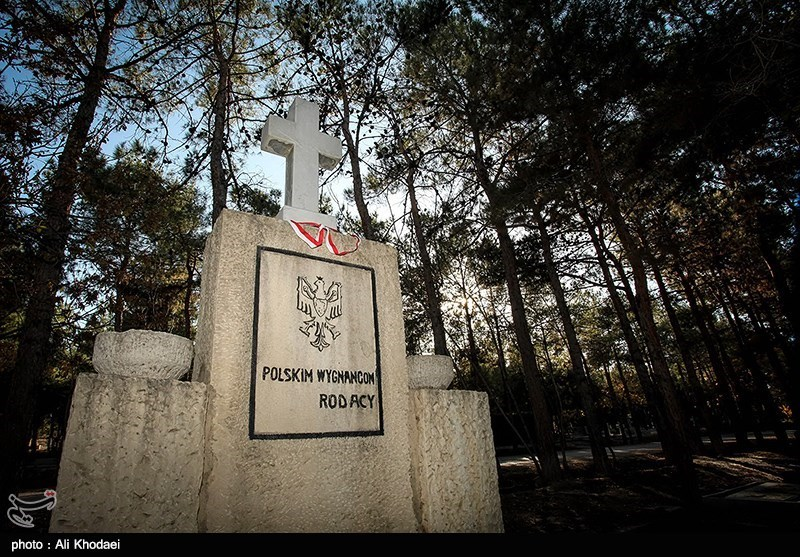
Polish Section

During World War II (1942–1945), hundreds of Polish orphans passed through Isfahan from Soviet Union en route to the Persian Gulf ports for departure to Africa or to New Zealand. Some of them lived in Isfahan from the beginning until the end of the war, other stayed there shortly.

The graves of the Polish refugees who did not succeed in returnig home is situated on a separate section at the eastern border of the cemetery, at the main alley dividing the cemetery and is surrounded by a rather low wall. At its right border, there are two rows of individual graves. The section includes 18 graves (1 military and 17 civilians) altogether. The principal element of the Polish plot is a central granite monument with Piast Eagle, engraved on it. The eagle is crowned and it has an image of Czestochowa Holy Mother on its chest. It is located near the grave of Tadeusz Mironowicz.

== See also ==
- New Julfa
- Iranian Armenians
- Armenian cemetery in Old Julfa

== Sources ==
- Utas, Bo (2002). "Borowsky, Isidore". Encyclopaedia Iranica.
