= William Bell (East India Company) =

William Bell (1591–24 February 1624) was an East India Company (EIC) factor in the city of Isfahan, the royal capital of Safavid Iran, during the reign of Safavid Shah Abbas the Great (r. 1688-1629). He came to Iran in 1616 during the reign of English King James I on board the barge James, carrying the EIC's first trial shipment of goods to Iran, and he was the first to disembark when the ship anchored at Jask. He served as the EIC's chief of trade in Iran from 1616 until his death. He was preceded by Edward Monox and was succeeded by Thomas Barker (younger).

The records of the EIC note that he died "after a seven nights sore visitation with a burning fever", despite the aid of Shah Abbas's best physicians. Bell's funeral, according to the same records, was attended by "Hollanders and such Franks as were resident, but likewise with Cogiah Nazer and other the principal of the Armenians, with all their churchmen... and at least 5000 Julfalines and other Xpians". Bell's grave, located at the New Julfa Armenian Cemetery, is the oldest known British grave in Iran. The headstone is inscribed in Latin.
