= Second Herat War =

Qajar Iran siege on Herat (March–October 1856)

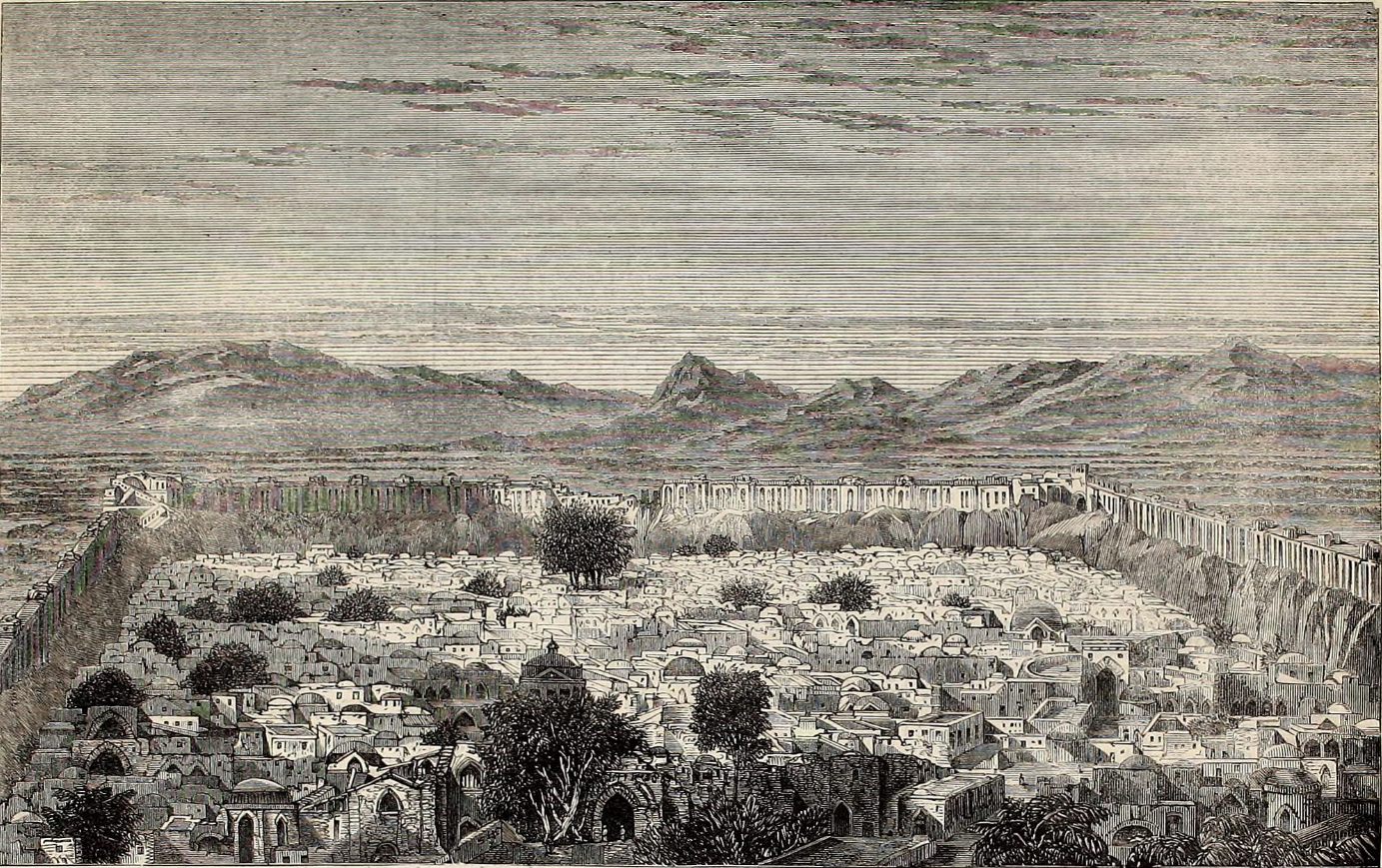
- View of Herat from the Citadel (1863) by the Illustrated London News.
Date	Late March 1856 – 26 October 1856 (7 months)
Location	Herat, Afghanistan
Result	Persian victory

Belligerents
Emirate of Herat Supported by: British Empire	Sublime State of Iran

Commanders and leaders
Mohammad-Yusuf Mirza Durrani (POW); 'Isa Khan Bardurrani; Sardar Majid Khan	Naser al-Din Shah; Mirza Aqa Khan Nuri; Morad Mirza Hesam o-Saltaneh

Strength
Unknown	20,000 total troops: 16 Infantry Regiments; Artillery Units; Regular and Irregular Cavalry

Casualties and losses
1,500	1,500

The Second Herat War (Persian: جنگ دوم هرات, romanized: Jang-e Dovom-e Herāt; late March 1856–26 October 1856) was the invasion of the surrounding realm of Herat and the successful siege of its citadel by the Qajar army led by Morad Mirza Hesam o-Saltaneh. The 1856 siege was part of the concerted Qajar effort to conquer western Afghanistan, known as the Herat Question. The conflict was also a part of the broader Great Game between the British Empire and the Russian Empire.

The Persian expedition into Herat was contrary to an agreement with the United Kingdom signed by Naser al-Din Shah in January 1853. According to this agreement, the Persian Government would refrain from sending troops to or interfering in the internal affairs of Herat. The siege was a major point of contention in the breakdown of Anglo-Persian relations and eventually became the catalyst for the Anglo-Persian War. After successfully capturing Herat, British agents were either expelled from Persia or left on their own accord. Despite dispatching Farrokh Khan Ghaffari to negotiate a diplomatic solution, the British were already preparing military action against Persia by July 1856. The British would inevitably issue a declaration of war on Persia from Calcutta on 1 November 1856. The Persian army would continue to occupy Herat and would only leave in compliance with the Treaty of Paris that ended the Anglo-Persian War. However, the Persian government managed to install Sultan Ahmad Khan as the puppet ruler of Herat prior to the ratification of the peace treaty with Britain.

== Background ==
In 1818, the Sadozai tribe ruled Herat semi-independently, while Kabul and Qandahar were ruled by the Barakzais and Mohammadzais, respectively. Herat had effectively been Independent since 1801. Persia had made several previous attempts to reconquer Herat with limited success. In 1807, 1811, 1814, and 1817 various attempts were made to conquer Herat, as it supported a rebellion in Khorasan at the time. The British ministers in Tehran had been vocal against the persistent efforts to conquer Herat in 1833, 1837, and 1852. Growing discontent was visible with the rise of Sa'id Mohammad Khan to the seat of power in Herat. In response, the Khanate of Qandahar led a renewed campaign against Herat. In early 1851, the Qandahari armies had occupied Farah, Lash wa Juwayn, and Sabzawar, closing within 100 kilometres of Herat. At the behest of Sayed Mohammad Khan, Persia intervened and occupied the city in late 1851, forcing Kohandel Khan of Qandahar to retreat. Faced with mounting British threats to break diplomatic relations and occupy Kharg island as they did during the 1837 campaign, the Persian army withdrew from Herat in January 1852. The subsequent Sheil-Nuri agreement of 1853 was aimed at curtailing Persia's influence over Herat.

Following the agreement, Sayed Mohammad Khan tilted his foreign policy away from Tehran in favor of the British. But with the backing of Persia, Mohammad-Yusuf Mirza Durrani replaced and later executed Sayed Mohammad in September 1855. With the death of Kohandel Khan in the same year, his brother and Emir of Kabul, Dost Mohammad Khan mobilized to seize Qandahar, capturing the city on 14 November 1855. Dost Mohammad Khan had made Tehran increasingly nervous about his intentions. In a treaty with Dost Mohammad in March 1855, the East India Company had considered him as the Emir of all of Afghanistan. With British backing, Dost Mohammad now declared his intention to march on Herat with the pretext of avenging the murder of his son-in-law, Sayed Mohammad. Given the political dynamic in Afghanistan, Naser al-Din Shah issued a royal order to begin troop mobilization across five provinces in December 1855. Mirza Malkam Khan's unequivocal call for the conquest of Herat was central to reaffirming the Shah's ambitions. Iran's strategic approach for Herat was also shaped by foreign minister Mirza Sai'd Khan, Farrokh Khan Ghaffari, and Nicolas Bourre, the French envoy in Tehran.

=== Hesam o-Saltaneh ===
Soltan Morad Mirza was an ideal candidate to lead the Qajar army. One of Abbas Mirza's 26 sons, Morad Mirza was a notably proud Qajar Prince. Of note among his characteristics, Soltan Morad Mirza's anti-British sentiments supported his candidacy given Tehran's diplomatic fallout with London at the time. He was a seasoned commander in the aftermath of the Revolt of Hasan Khan Salar. Amid the scramble to retake Mashhad, Soltan Morad Mirza was declared the new Governor-General of Khorasan. He was dispatched at the head of one of two armies with a force of 7,000 and four artillery pieces. The war with Salar, who was Morad Mirza's cousin, would soon turn into one of attrition and the commander would remain behind Mashhad's walls until March 1850. Following the revolt, Naser al-Din Shah bestowed the title of Hesam o-Saltaneh (Sword of the Kingdom) upon his uncle. Thus, the Qajar Imperial Court decided that an army under Morad Mirza Hesam o-Saltaneh was to push forward with all speed to secure Herat and avoid its potential capture by Dost Mohammad Khan. The Persian government tried to justify this action with a manifesto published through the Tehran Gazette. The manifesto proclaimed that Dost Mohammad would march on Herat and later invade Khorasan. With this narrative, Tehran claimed that its actions were only in defense of its own institutions and the maintenance of its territorial integrity and that the army dispatched to Herat was to "rescue that Kingdom from the grasp of Dost Mohammad."

== Order of Battle ==
In Fātiḥ-i Harāt: Sulṭān Murād Mīrzā Ḥusām al-Salṭanah, Najmi listed the regiments (Persian: افواج) raised in the initial deployment of the Persian expeditionary force to Herat, and those units mentioned in the siege of its citadel. Standish cites the total size of the Persian army at 20,000 strong during the siege. Amanat references an irate letter from Chancellor (Sadr-e A'zam) Mirza Aqa Khan Nuri to Hesam o-Saltaneh, in which he berates the siege's slow progress despite an army of 15,000 at the general's disposal. According to this letter, the Persian army set out with 10,000 troops and 10,000 tomans, to which Nuri sent an additional 80,000 tomans and dispatched 5,000 reinforcements. David Charles Champagne cites the Persian army as 24,000 strong, with 14,000 infantry and the rest being matchlockmen and irregular cavalry. He also cites Morad Mirza's forces as being in possession of 26 cannons. Mohammad Yusuf cites the Persian army as 25,000 strong with 30 cannons. The Persian cannons had little effect on the siege however, since they got stuck in Herat's mud walls.

Persian Army

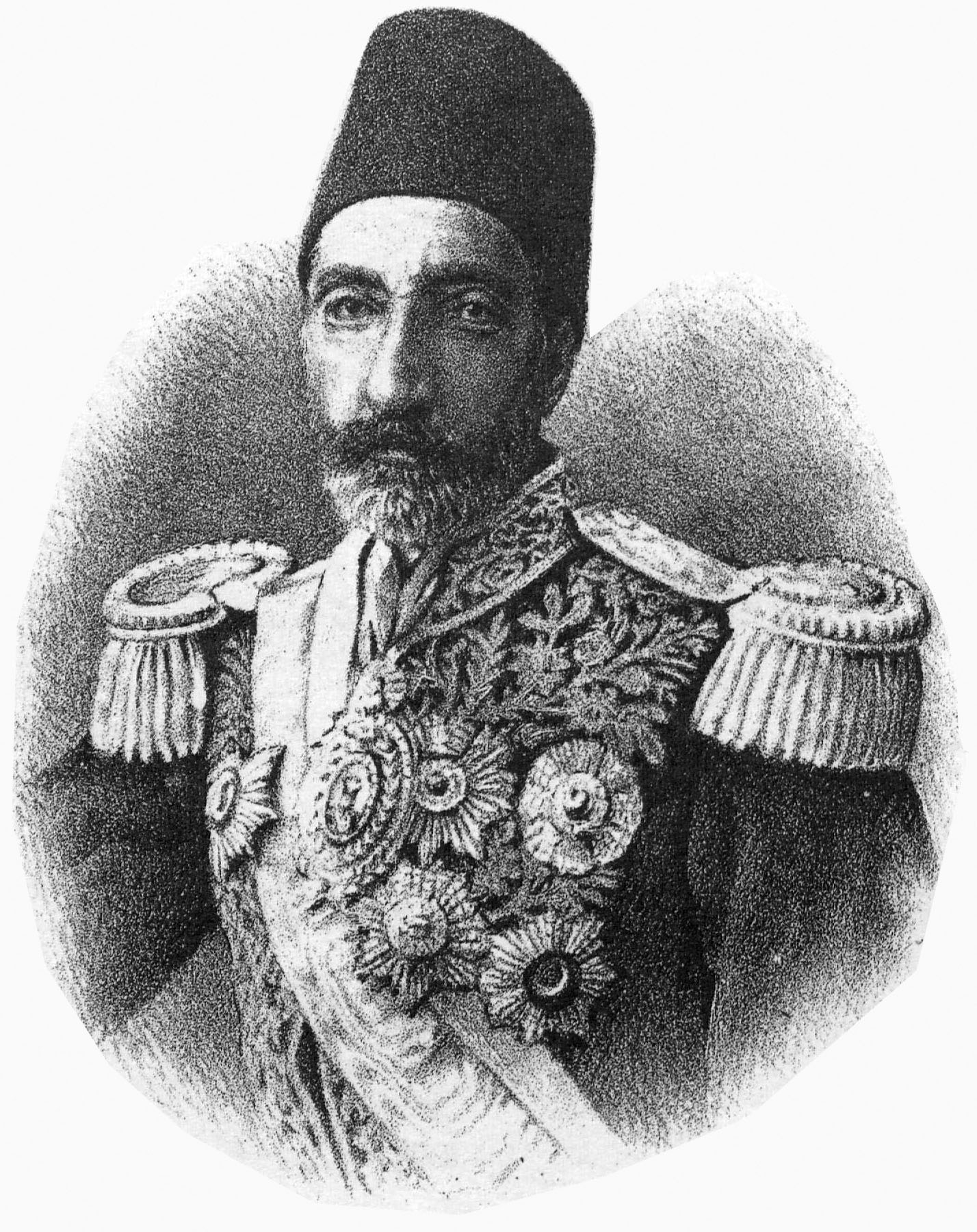
Prince Soltan Morad Mirza, Hesam o-Saltaneh by Aboutorab Ghaffari (13 March 1883).

General Hesam o-Saltaneh, Soltan Morad Mirza

Regiment or Unit	Commander
Shaqāqi Informants Regiment	Qāsem Khān
Regiment of Khoy	Col. (Sarhang) Bāgher Āghā
Regiment of Gerrus	Col. Hassan Ali Khan Garroosy
New Regiment of Marāgheh	Col. Eskandar Khān
Regiment of Semnān	Pāshā Khān Mokri
Regiment of Dāmghān	Pāshā Khān Mokri
Shaqāqi Regiment of Khorāsān	Rahmatollāh Khān
Afshār Regiment of Urmia	Brig. Gen. (Sartip) Yousef Khān
New Regiment of Tehrān	Mohammadreza Khān Kerkeri
Old Regiment of Qazvin	Abbasqoli Khān Seif ol-Molk
New Regiment of Qazvin	Col. Khān Baba Khān
Old Khamseh Regiment	Brig. Gen. Mirza Ibrahim Khān
6th Regiment of Tabriz	Col. Mohammad Bāgher Khān
Regiment of Khodābandelu	Col. Jafargholi Khān
Ajam Regiment of Bastām	Brig. Gen. Navab Jahansuz Aghā Mirpanjeh
Arab Regiment of Bastām	Brig. Gen. Amir Ali Khān
Khorāsan Cavalry	Amir Hossein Khān
Cavalry Regiment of Khorāsān	Sam Khān Ilkhāni
Cavalry of Hazāra Afghans	Sam Khān Ilkhāni
Shahsavan Cavalry	Sofrali Khān
Cavalry Regiment of Torshiz	Sofrali Khān
Gholam-Pishkhedmatān Horse of Khorāsān	Brig. Gen. Abolqāsem Khān

== Capture of Ghurian ==
=== Battle of Zendeh Jan ===
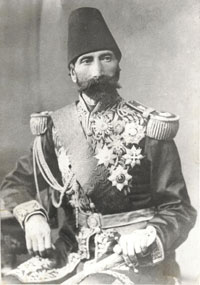
Hassan Ali Khan Garroosy would receive the title of Generalissimo (Amir Nezam) in 1884.

Amid the organization of the Persian expeditionary force, Hesam o-Saltaneh dispatched Col. Allahverdi Khan to lead an artillery detachment with 70 rounds of ordnance towards Ghurian to commence the bombardment of its fort. Mohammad Yusuf ordered the commander of the fort at Ghurian, Ahmad Khan Qale-Kahi to avoid the bombardment and sortie to meet Hesam o-Saltaneh's incoming army at its encampment. Commander Ahmad Khan marched towards the Persian army with 2,000 Afghan cavalry. Hesam o-Saltaneh ordered Sam Khan Ilkhani Zafaranlu to lead the Cavalry of Khorasan and Cavalry of Hazara Afghans and Sofrali Khan at the head of the Shahsavan Cavalry and Cavalry Regiment of Torshiz with two artillery pieces to form against the encroaching enemy. The next day, the Afghan riders under Ahmad Khan engaged Sam Khan Ilkhani's cavalry at Zendeh Jan. The Cavalry Regiment of Torshiz and the Zaferanlu cavalry similarly charged the Afghan riders, while the Persian cannons fired to break the enemy's formation. Under artillery fire and pressure from the Persian cavalry, the remaining forces under Ahmad Khan eventually fled eastward.

=== Siege of Ghurian ===
Simultaneously on the 20th of Rajab (27 March 1856), Hassan Ali Khan Garroosy led his veteran Regiment of Gerrus to the Persian camp. That same day, Hesam o-Saltaneh ordered a four-pronged assault on Ghurian's fort to commence at dawn. The Persian army mobilized and commenced the siege, which proceeded quickly. Commander Majid Khan, the ruler of Ghurian, interceded on behalf of the Afghan defenders. Carrying a copy of the Quran, he surrendered at the Persian camp. The news of the capture of Ghurian had an impact on the already-fractured resolve of the administration in Herat. Ataullah Khan, the leader of the Timuri sub-tribe, decided to abandon Herat with 4,000 tribesmen and 400 Timuri guards. The Afghan commander surrendered to Hesam o-Saltaneh who allowed them to settle at the Persian encampment.

=== March to Sang-e Sefid ===
The Persian army mobilized a detachment of its most veteran regiments from Ghurian towards Herat. Khorasan's elite cavalry of 500 riders with two artillery pieces and another contingent of 1,200 riders and one gun from Arak marched eastward. Amir Hossein Khan, Sam Khan Ilkhani's brother, led these regiments to within one farsang of Mosalla, where the troops were to await orders for an assault. Sam Khan was ordered to lead 500 Khorasani and Kurdish carabiniers. Pasha Khan Mokri commanded the Regiment of Semnan, Regiment of Damghan, a veteran Turco-Kurdish cavalry unit, and four pieces of siege artillery. These detachments were instructed to create a perimeter around the field of Sang-e Sefid, which left Herat's citadel within firing distance of the Persian cannons.

== Siege of Herat ==
=== Beginning of the siege ===
Once the Persian detachments reached Sang-e Sefid, an Afghan infantry contingent sortied from Herat's keep. Armed with rifles and arquebuses, they fired on the Qajar troops from elevated ground. Once the Persian force was within range, the Afghan artillery bombarded their positions from Herat's towers. The Persian detachment responded with their own volleys and engaged the Afghan infantry in melee combat. The remainder of the Persian force had also reached the field and Hesam o-Saltaneh orchestrated the Persian regiments to advance on the left and right flanks. Once the scrimmage at the front line turned critical for the Qajar troops, Hesam o-Saltaneh ordered Hassan Ali Khan Garroosy to group with Abolfath Khan leading the Shaqaqi Regiment and Regiment of Nishapur. A veteran cavalry squadron followed this division. This detachment launched a multi-pronged attack on the Afghan front, managing to break their lines. The Persian general then ordered his artillery to relocate on a hillside overlooking the field and fire on the Herati defenders. After an arduous hour, the Afghan infantry finally wavered, retreating back to Herat's citadel. Despite the Persian victory, the standard of the Regiment of Nishapur was lost to the Afghans, and the standard-bearer who had been injured in the onslaught was expelled from the army. With the successful diversion of the Afghan assault, the Persian army closed in and surrounded Herat's walls.

=== Breakdown of negotiations ===
In a letter to Hesam o-Saltaneh, Mohammad Yusuf Khan petitioned that he had been a long-time servant under the Qajar government and that his hesitation at welcoming the Persian army was due to the opposition of Herat's elders and clergy. Mohammad Yusuf offered his younger brother, Mohammadreza as a hostage, along with two of the city's cannons. In return, the ruler of Herat requested that the Persian army fall back sufficiently from the city's walls so that the prince could safely visit the Iranian general in person. Contingent on Mohammad Yusuf's timely abdication, Hesam o-Saltaneh agreed to these terms and withdrew his forces seven farsangs from Herat. However, the government of Herat was vying for time and increasingly delaying negotiations. In response, the Iranian general arrested Majid Khan, a Herati official previously loyal to the Qajar government. Majid Khan was eventually transferred to Tehran. Likewise, the Mufti of Herat was arrested in Mashhad while on a peacemaking mission to the Shah. The back-and-forth petitions clarified that Mohmmad Yusuf had no intentions of surrendering Herat, and so Hesam o-Saltaneh ordered his troops to besiege the citadel once again. The Persian army began developing earthworks around Herat's walls, entrenching their position and chipping its defenses. With the threat of Dost Mohammad Khan mobilizing against Herat earlier in the campaign, the Shah had reached out to Dost Mohammad with proposals of a coalition against the British government. The British consul in Tehran, Richard Stevens, deduced that this proposal was a little more than an attempt to delay the Afghan Emir from marching on Herat himself.

=== Capture of Mohammad Yusuf Khan ===
In a desperate attempt to alleviate mounting pressures from both east and west, Mohammad Yusuf Khan declared Herat a vassal of the United Kingdom and hoisted the British flag. Charles Canning, the new Governor-General of British India promptly clarified that Mohammad Yusuf's actions were without authority. With the political situation in Herat deteriorating, Isa Khan Bardurrani, the vizier of Herat arrested Mohammad Yusuf in a swift coup. Isa Khan promptly handed the Herati prince to the Persian camp on 28 April 1856. Noelle-Karimi seemingly hints that Mohammad Yusuf was promptly executed by the Persian army. However, Najmi's account states that the ruler of Herat was imprisoned by Hesam o-Saltaneh, who transferred Mohammad Yusuf to Tehran for sentencing. Under this narrative, Mohammad Yusuf was coerced into confession before the Shah, who promptly ordered his beheading, but Nuri interceded and managed to reduce the sentence to imprisonment. Amanat corroborates Najmi's narrative by stating that Mohammad Yusuf would be executed one day before the ratification of the Treaty of Paris on 3 March 1857. The coup in Herat created a power vacuum with Gholam Khan Qufazai revolting in the grey tower region of Herat, while one of Sayed Mohammad Khan's sons bid control over Qutub-e Chaq. Abbas Khan Rayhan established a republican emirate around Khwaja Abdullah Misri. Despite the ongoing siege, Isa Khan managed to overcome the internal rivalries and consolidate his control within Herat's walls.

=== Stagnation of the siege ===
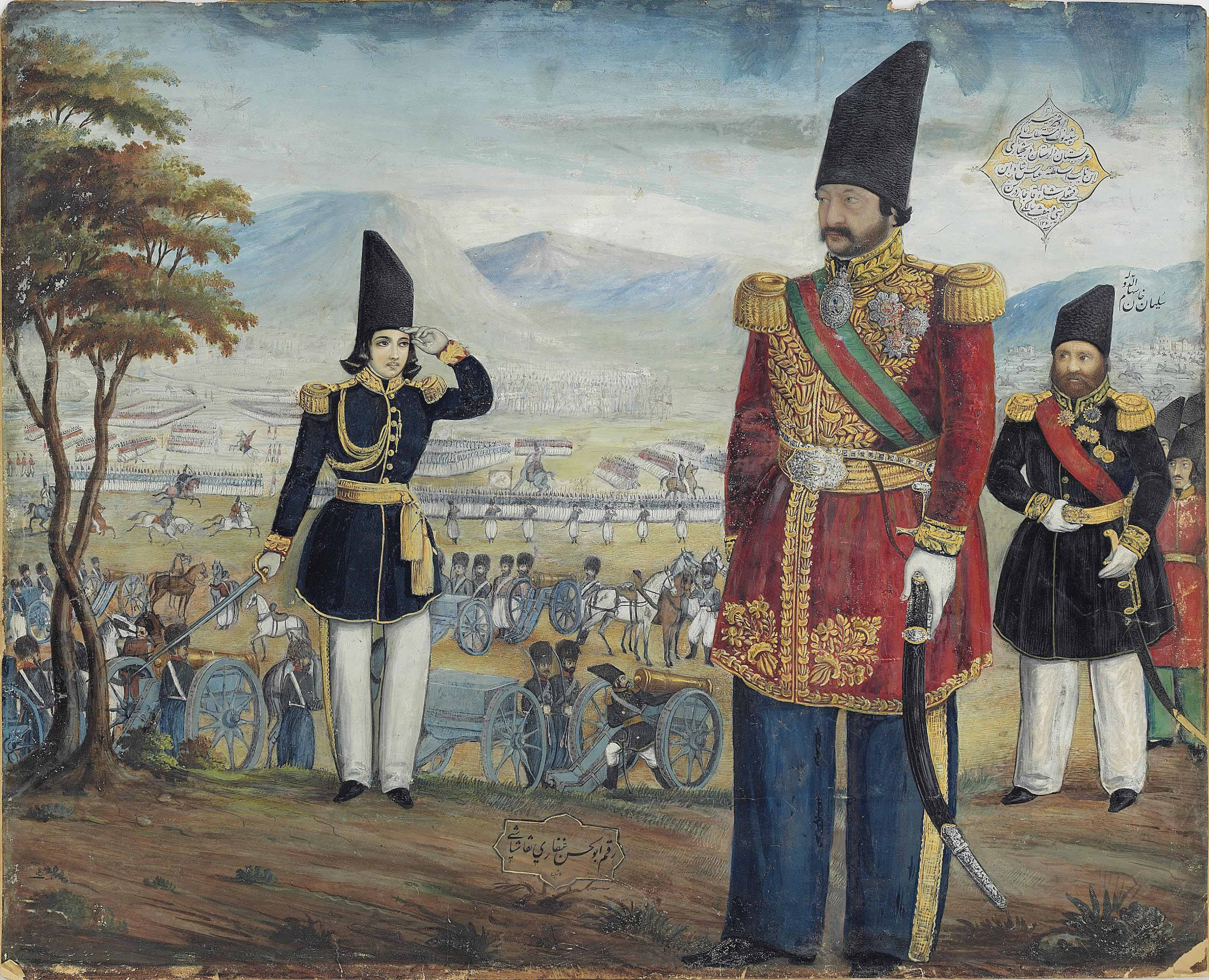
Ardeshir Mirza and Solayman Khan Saham al-Dowleh review the reformed Persian troops by Abu'l Hassan Ghaffari (1851).

A major problem faced by the Persian army was the lack of discipline and an illiteracy of military operations by the Qajar troops. Rampant corruption was infamous among the ranks of Persia's military at the time and despite countless reforms, the dynasty was not able to produce a dependable rank and file. Najmi states that during the campaign, various regiments would compete with one another, often disobeying commands for the glory of breaking through Herat's defenses. These inefficiencies slowed the siege's progress. Standish lists other factors that contributed to the stagnation, including an accidental explosion of the Qajar army's ammunition depots. Given these shortcomings, Hesam o-Saltaneh made little headway against Isa Khan in Herat. After several months, the siege on Herat remained stagnant. The Shah was growing increasingly restless, but Chancellor Nuri convinced his highness of the arduous conditions Hesam o-Saltaneh dealt with on the front lines. Herat was famed for its resistance to Persian rule and capturing the city was considered a significant feat. The Chancellor agreed to dispatch Monsieur Boehler, with a contingent of reinforcements, to lead the squadron of army engineers in the siege. Alexandre Boehler was a French army engineer hired as a mathematics instructor at the Dar ul-Funun Polytechnic. Najmi states that the contingent of reinforcements reached the Prince's camp outside of Herat in six days. To motivate a breakthrough, the Shah threatened Hesam o-Saltaneh with a criminal charge and the personal reimbursement of the expeditionary budget if Herat did not fall within a certain number of days. The Persians also had to deal with bands of Turkmen and Jamshidi tribesmen seizing supplies. In May 1856 the main supply of the Persian ammunition accidentally blew up, killing over 300 men. Between the start of the siege and the final breakthrough into the citadel of Herat, the Qajar administration in Tehran dispatched several divisions of reinforcements to join Hesam ol-Saltaneh's expeditionary force. Most of these reinforcements were composed of reformed Nezam Infantry regiments from Iran's north. Of note, the 7th Savadkuh Regiment was dispatched to Herat under Brigadier General Ali Khan Savadkuhi. Abbas Ali Khan, Reza Shah's father, had served as a Major and First Lieutenant of this regiment in the 1856 siege of Herat. Morad Ali Khan, Reza Shah's grandfather had served and died as part of the same regiment in the failed siege of Herat in 1848.

=== First breach ===
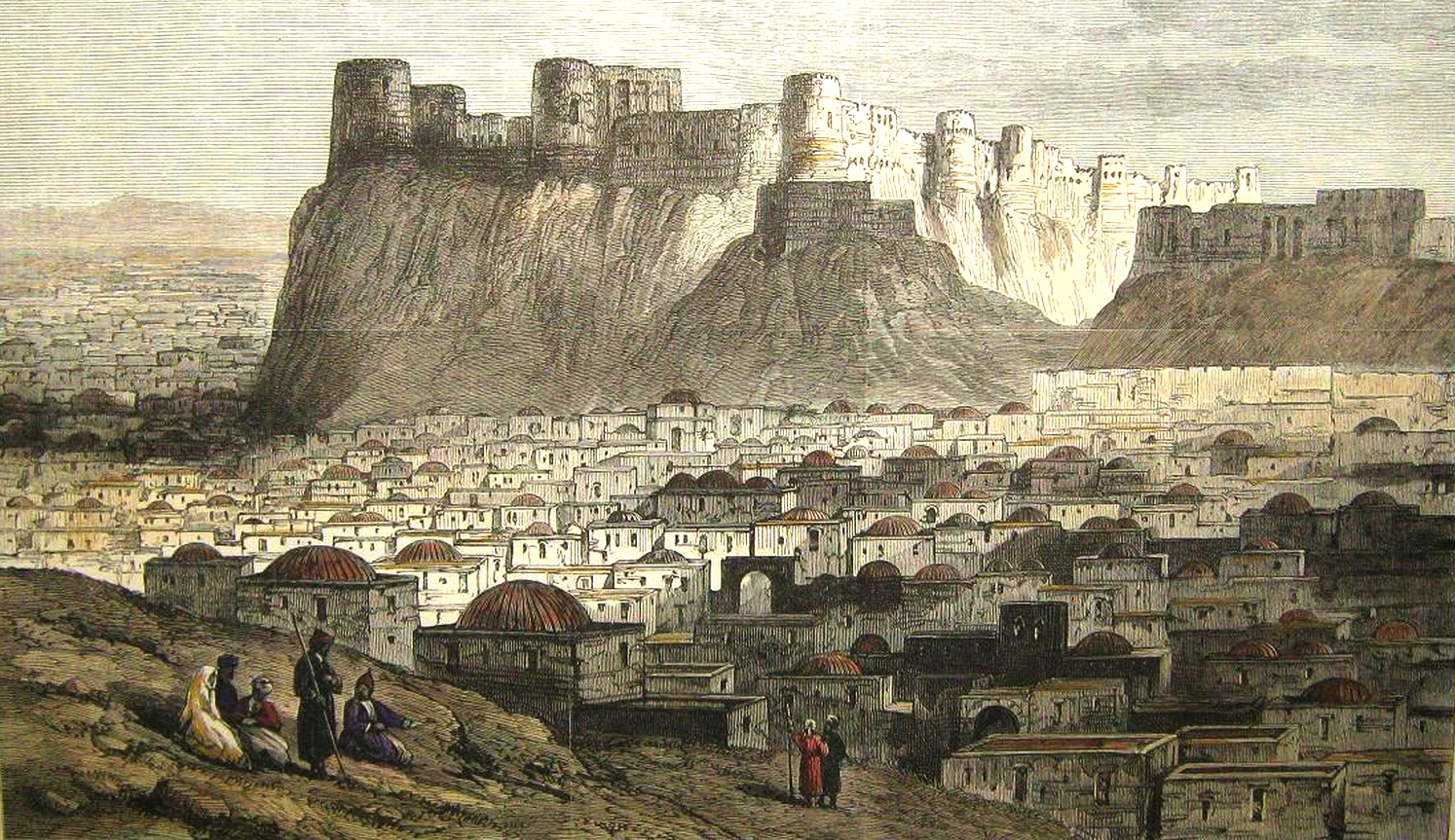
The Citadel of Herat in 1879.

Inside the city, Amir Abbas Herati, a prominent courtier whose loyalties lay with the Qajar government, made a covert visit to the Persian camp. Under the orders of Sartip Heidar Qoli Khan and Mirza Hossein, the Mostofi of Herat, Amir Abbas was to deliver news that a coalition of the city's Shia and Farsi-speaking population planned to realize the Qajar army's entry. At the opportune moment, the coalition's leadership would inform the Persian officers of the location for a suitable breach. Upon receiving the news, Hesam o-Saltaneh briefed Sam Khan Ilkhani and Hossein Khan Yuz-Bashi on his plans for an assault. The night of the coalition's information, Hossein Khan enforced the general's strict command that no regiment was to mobilize and that all soldiers should remain at their posts. Hossein Khan then visited the trenches of the Gerrus regiment managed by Hassan Ali Khan and Col. Mohammadreza Khan. Hossein Khan instructed those commanders to mobilize their troops at dawn with the broadcast of a secret catchphrase.

In the early hours of 28 August, Sam Khan Ilkhani and Abbas Khan Heravi stationed their regiments in the Aliakbar Khan garden, awaiting a signal from inside the city. Heidar Qoli Khan and Mirza Hossein led pro-Persian coalition forces against the Abdullah Misri tower. The conspirators fired the seven cannon towards the Afghan defenders manning the defenses around the tower and signaled the Persian troops. Sam Khan Ilkhani and Abbas Khan initiated the assault from the exterior. 6,000 Afghan troops and 3,00 Herati citizens prepared to defend the city. Hassan Ali Khan Garroosy advanced with his regiment towards the Abdullah Misri tower. However, Mohammadreza Khan and Qasem Khan disregarded their orders to wait and mobilized the dismounted Cavalry Regiment of Torshiz and Qara'i soldiers. The Shia inhabitants of Herat, surrounding the tower from the inside, lowered ropes for the Persian troops. Mirza Najaf Khan and Amir Abbas Khan first climbed the tower with 200 soldiers. Sam Khan, Hassan Ali Khan, Mohammadreza Khan, and Qasem Khan could lead another contingent of 200 to the top of the tower. In total, 740 Iranian troops were brought up towards the towers. This detachment managed to push back the remaining Afghan defenders from the tower and advance to surrounding keeps. The Persian troops first occupied the seven towers facing Qandahar's direction before capturing seven other towers near the Khoosh gate.

The Persian infantry seized an 18-pounder gun atop Abdullah Misri tower, turning it on the city. When the cannon ran out of ammunition, Hossein Khan Yuz-Bashi was dispatched to fetch ordnance. Despite having his mount shot from under him, Hossein Khan headed back to the camp on foot. After reaching Col. Abdol Ali Khan, commander of the artillery, Hossein returned to the tower with ammunition and a Toopchi squadron of five.

As the assault progressed, Pasha Khan Mokri, who had been oblivious to the secretive assault, led the Regiment of Semnan and Regiment of Damghan into Herat through the Khoosh gate. The commander was under the impression that Herat was on the verge of collapse and was eager to earn his regiments’ share of the glory. Simultaneously, a group of servicemen made their way into Herat from the Persian camp to pillage the city. The sight of looting hindered the progress of the assault as the Persian troops soon joined the raiders, leaving their posts atop the towers. Hesam o-Saltaneh was compelled to make a personal appearance to deter the Qajar infantry from looting, shouting "You sons of...soldiers! Why are you returning, and giving me a bad name? I have still summoned some other regiments from the camp to enter the city. Go back! Aid the people who aided you, lest the Afghans finish them [off]." to no avail. It was impossible to tell the difference between the Shi'as and Sunnis, as their clothes were virtually identical. The breakdown in discipline allowed the wavering Afghan defenders to retake their defensive positions with relative ease. Hesam o-Saltaneh narrowly escaped death when his horse was shot under him, resuming his command with another mount. The Persian forces were soon forced to retreat outside of Herat's walls. During the turmoil, Mirza Najaf Khan and Mirza Razi Khan were shot and decapitated at the hands of the Afghan defenders. The Persian army recorded a total of 50 casualties in the assault. According to Champagne, the number was closer to 250. Mohammad Yusuf reports 74 Iranian troops, 120 Qizilbash/Shi'i, and 125 Afghans were killed. Nobody attempted to bury the Shi'i casualties for three days, and the Afghans began to pillage their homes. Aqa Sayyid Mohammad, a Shi'a chaplain, was cut to pieces and his body was thrown into a cast metal pot and eaten. Shi'is who had marriage relations with Sunnis were spared.

The Afghan forces, believing they could route the entire Persian army, organized a formidable force and charged out towards the Persian camp. While panic swept through some in the Qajar rank and file, Col. Abdol Ali Khan ordered his artillery to fire close-range shots at the charging Afghan infantry. Causing many casualties, the Persian cannons stopped the Afghan charge and forced the remaining defenders to retreat towards the gate.

=== Continued siege and prospect of negotiation ===
Following the failed breach of Herat, the Persian general commissioned Alexandre Boehler to lead the army's engineers in digging a network of tunnels and fracturing the city's walls. Boehler ordered the creation of several explosive mortar shells, which the Persian artillery fired at strategic Afghan defensive positions. The bombardment had a severe impact on the morale of Herat's population, giving rise to protests against the continued siege and resistance. A council of Herat's citizens dispatched Akhundzadeh Mohammad Aslam Khan to Hesam o-Saltaneh's camp. The envoy stated that he negotiated on Isa Khan's behalf and that he was willing to renegotiate the city's surrender. Hesam o-Saltaneh dispatched Hossein Khan Yuz-Bashi to Herat's citadel to hear Isa Khan's terms. Isa Khan exhibited his preparedness to surrender the citadel if the Persian army would retreat to Ghurian for the Herati officials to safely attend a meeting with the Persian leadership. To avoid further bloodshed and raise the prospects of a peaceful occupation, Hesam o-Saltaneh agreed to the terms and prepared to withdraw his army back to Ghurian. Amid this decision, Persian troops intercepted a letter to Qandahar from Isa Khan in which he requested troops and supplies from Dost Mohammad Khan. Hesam o-Saltaneh ordered the Afghan messenger's hands and ears to be severed and sent back to Herat. The Persian army returned to its positions and revitalized the effort to breach Herat.

== Capture of Herat ==
=== Final assault ===
Once preparations for a final breach of Herat ended, Hesam o-Saltaneh ordered a two-pronged assault. First, the Shaqaqi Informants and Torshiz regiments charged and captured the Abdullah Misri tower. Simultaneously, the general ordered the Bozchalo Regiment to attack the Iraq gate and the Gray Tower. Najmi states that the Persian army also initiated a frontal assault on the Afghan positions outside the citadel. On the ninth day of the initiative, all remaining Afghan defenders manning the exterior defenses retreated into the fort. Amid the battle, waves of refugees deserted the city for the Persian camp. Once the battle within Herat's walls drew to a close, Hesam o-Saltaneh dispatched infantry squads to climb above the city's towers and broadcast the message: “nasr men Allah va fath qarib “(victory from God and the conquest is nigh). This news signaled the defeat to the remaining Afghan defenders across the city's districts, prompting their surrender.

=== Capture and occupation ===
The Persian army finally conquered Herat on 11 Safar 1273 (11 October 1856). Barricaded in the citadel, Isa Khan feared the prospect of Hesam o-Saltaneh having him executed. The ruler of Herat sent Haj Abolkheir, who was a revered Sayyed, to persuade the Persian general to pardon Isa Khan. Hesam o-Saltaneh assured Haj Abolkheir of Isa Khan's diplomatic immunity. Abdollah Khan Jamshidi Beyglarbeygi and Fathollah Khan Firouzkoohi escorted Isa Khan to Hesam o-Saltaneh's camp. Sam Khan Ilkhani was responsible for occupying Herat's interior with the Zaferanlu Regiment. The Persian commander granted passage to Isa Khan upon his exit from Herat. Hesam o-Saltaneh held an audience at the Persian camp with Isa Khan, who surrendered to the general and expressed his loyalty by providing him with archived letters that Dost Mohammad Khan had sent him during the siege.

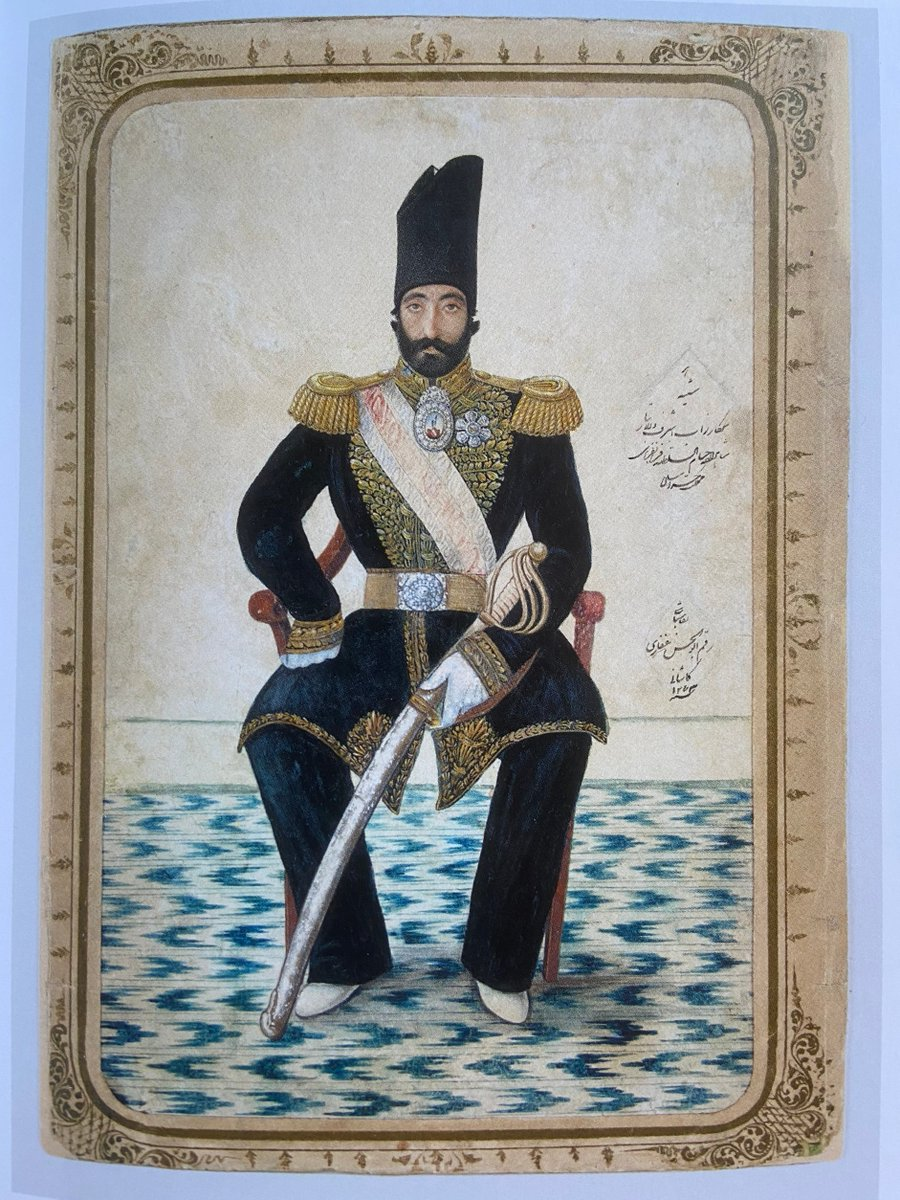
Portrait of Hesam o-Saltaneh by Sani ol-Molk, dated 1856.

Following Herat's conquest (12 October 1856), the city's prominent nobles honored Hesam o-Saltaneh. Mohammad Khan, Aman Niyaz Turkaman, and Khan Mohammad Khan were among the Afghan nobles that expressed their loyalty to the Qajar Shah. The Persian general dispatched Hasan Ali Khan Garroosy to lead his regiment in forming a defensive perimeter around the city. In the main square of the Bazaar, Hasan Ali Khan established a sheriff's office and dispatched guards to all of the city's gates. The Gerrus regiment controlled the defensive towers. To ensure the city's safety and prevent looting, Hesam o-Saltaneh ordered all other Persian troops to remain in the camp. The army forbade soldiers from entering Herat without prior permission. The Persian general ordered Isa Khan back to the city to aid in the transfer of power under the supervision of Sam Khan Ilkhani. The Persian troops restored order in the streets of Herat in anticipation of the victory parade. With the old government removed, the Iranian diaspora of Herat and the Shia Hazara population regathered in the city. On Friday, on 1 Rabi al-Awwal, 1273 (30 October 1856), Hesam o-Saltaneh entered the city just before sunset, along with the commanding officers of the Persian regiments. The commanders were escorted on either side by four regiments, including the Afshar Regiment of Urmia, the New Regiment of Maragheh, the Regiment of Qazvin, and the Regiment of Khoy. At the parade's vanguard, 600 cavalry guards carried the standards of the regiments and battle flags into the city.

Reza Qoli Khan Hedayat, the author of the Rozat ol-Safay-e Naseri, chronicled the parade. Hedayat highlights that Hesam o-Saltaneh entered the city through the Qanadahr gate. He was accompanied by Sam Khan Ilkhani, Agha Khan Mirpanj, Isa Khan, Abdollah Jamshidi, Majid Khan (Isa Khan's son-in-law), Janu Khan, and other Persian commanders and Herati nobles. The parade then made its way to the citadel, and Hesam o-Saltaneh's entourage entered the gathering hall. A ceremonial procession was held there, and the Herati nobles loyal to the Qajar dynasty paid respects to Hesam o-Saltaneh, who assured them of the Shah's praises. A Persian force led by Sam Khan Ilkhani and Hossein Khan Yuz-Bashi controlled the crowds gathering around the citadel. As part of the ceremony, a well-spoken orator gave sermons in the name of the Sultan of Sultans, Naser al-din Shah. Finally, the nobles of Herat were granted gifts, and the Persians appeased the crowds with pastries and sharbat.

== Aftermath ==
When Herat fell on the 11th of Safar, prior to receiving the Chronicles of the Conquest (Fathnameh), false rumors of Hesam o-Saltaneh's death spread across Tehran from an uncertain source. The rumors were troublesome and created much confusion in the Iranian government concerning the situation in Herat. However, the rumors were soon put to rest and the general's letters confirmed that he had indeed survived the battle. Gholam Hossein Khan Yuz-Bashi Shahsavan, the official news writer of the campaign was dispatched to deliver the news to Tehran. Najmi states that Hasan Beig, the official treasurer of the Persian army, was dispatched to deliver the Chronicles of the Conquest to the Qajar Court. On 2 November 1856, at four in the afternoon, the Shah was sitting in the Mirror Hall of the outer court of the Golestan Palace, next to the Crystal Fountain. His servant in waiting, Yadullah Khan, brought news of the successful conquest in Herat, for which he was gifted with a thousand tomans. In the margin of a Persian translation of Louis de Bourrienne's Memoirs of Napoleon Bonaparte, the Shah wrote:

Thanks to Murtaza 'Ali's blessings, peace be upon him, this was a praiseworthy victory and the eyes of the enemy, particularly the British, turned blind [with jealousy]. Hundred and ten gun salutes were fired in honor of his holiness 'Ali.

— Naser al-Din Shah

The Qajar court announced a public levee in honor of the occasion, during which the court chronicler recited the official records of the conquest as ascribed to Hesam o-Saltaneh. The document lists the administrative decisions taken in the aftermath of Herat's capture. In a symbolic move, the Shah's name was mentioned in the Friday sermon and the Shia adhan became the call to prayer. Similarly, the mint struck coins in Naser al-din's name. A public holiday was soon declared and a national booklet outlining the conquest was disseminated.

In the leadup to the conquest of Herat, the Persian government had become more resolute in its position against Britain. The Chancellor, carried away by the prospect of victory, instructed Farrokh Khan that “the affair should not precipitate a war with Britain. If however, the British are dragging their feet, trust in God, we too are ready.” Following the capture of Herat, Nuri's tone became even more confident. He instructed Farrokh Khan not to succumb to excessive British demands and assured him that the Qajar army can successively capture Qandahar, Kabul, and push into Punjab with “no grave hassle.” Despite the rambunctious reaction to Herat's conquest from the Persian court, Tehran's strategy remained the same as before. Nuri was adamant that the Persian embassy should find a diplomatic solution and maintain friendship between Iran and Britain.

Britain was overtly concerned with the Persian campaign against Herat. Lord Palmerston issued his first warning to the Shah on 24 May 1856. Naser al-din Shah did not interpret the message as London intended and was rather inclined that Britain would concede more favorable concessions should the Persian army appear unwavering at Herat. In anticipation of Herat's fall, Chancellor Nuri delayed his response to the first warning until September. Clarendon issued a second warning to Iran on 10 October, two weeks before Herat's fall. This ultimatum reached Tehran by 19 November, bringing much anxiety to the Qajar court as it outlined that an expedition had been dispatched to the Persian Gulf to await orders for an invasion should Iran provoke further retaliation. The Persian victory at Herat went against all of Britain's regional plans, but it also set into motion a range of dangerous prospects that were previously unforeseen. Hesam o-Saltaneh's success rekindled the Shah's youthful ambitions of eastward expansion into India reminiscent of Nader Shah's campaigns. Muhammad Najaf Mirza, a claimed cousin of Bahadur Shah, provided further encouragement to the Shah as he had taken refuge in the Qajar court. He voiced the anti-British rhetoric in India to Naser al-Din and assured him of a looming rebellion against British rule. Muhammad Najaf had predicted the Indian Mutiny, and while the Shah found his suggestion compelling, the British declaration of war constrained his capacity to test such a prospect. The arrival of the British declaration of war in Iran coincided with the second public levee held on 25 November 1856, in commemoration of Herat's capture.

== See also ==
- Anglo-Persian War
- First Herat War
