= Islamofascism =

Concept relating Islamism and fascism

Islamofascism is a portmanteau of the words fascism and Islamism or Islamic fundamentalism, which advocate authoritarianism and violent extremism to establish an Islamic state, in addition to promoting offensive Jihad. For example, Qutbism has been characterized as an Islamic terrorist ideology.

Interactions between Muslim figures and fascism began as early as 1933, and some used the term fascism to describe as diverse phenomenon as the Pakistan independence movement, Gamal Abdel Nasser's Arab nationalism in Egypt, religious appeals used by Arab dictatorships to stay in power, and the Young Egypt Party (a fascist era-group inspired by Italian fascism). The invention of the term has been variously attributed to Khalid Duran, Lulu Schwartz, and Christopher Hitchens. Beginning in the 1990s, some scholars have described fascist influences to refer to violent Islamist movements such as those of Ruhollah Khomeini and Osama bin Laden, and "reached its apogee" following the September 11 attacks, but by 2018 it had "largely" disappeared from use among policymakers and academics.

The term Islamofascism to refer to the varying distinctions between Islam and fascism has been criticized for allegedly besmirching the Islamic religion by associating it with a violent ideology (i.e. being used as a name for Islam), and defended as a way of distinguishing traditional Islam from Islamic extremist violence (i.e. being used as a name for Islamism, a variety of Islam). In April 2008, the Extremist Messaging Branch of the U.S. National Counterterrorism Center under the Bush Administration issued an advisory to branches of the U.S. federal government to avoid using the term, among other terms, in part because it was "considered offensive by many Muslims" that the U.S. government was trying to reach.

== Concepts and overview ==
=== Background and origins ===
==== Meaning and history of the term ====
The term "Islamofascism" is defined in the New Oxford American Dictionary as "a term equating some modern Islamic movements with the European fascist movements of the early twentieth century". Author and journalist Stephen Schwartz defines it as the "use of the faith of Islam as a cover for a totalitarian ideology". Historian Robert Paxton has countered the use of the term entirely, considering it as an inappropriate use of the word fascism to describe Islamic extremists.

The earliest example of the term "Islamofascism", according to William Safire, occurs in a 1990 article by Malise Ruthven to refer to the way in which traditional Arab dictatorships used religious appeals in order to stay in power.

"Nevertheless there is what might be called a political problem affecting the Muslim world. In contrast to the heirs of some other non-Western traditions, including Hinduism, Shintoism and Buddhism, Islamic societies seem to have found it particularly hard to institutionalise divergences politically: authoritarian government, not to say Islamo-fascism, is the rule rather than the exception from Morocco to Pakistan."

Ruthven doubts that he himself coined the term, stating that the attribution to him is probably due to the fact that internet search engines do not go back beyond 1990.

==== Uses ====
The earliest known use of the contiguous term Islamic Fascism dates to 1933 when Akhtar Husain, in an attack on Muhammad Iqbal, defined attempts to secure the independence of Pakistan as a form of Islamic fascism. Some analysts consider Manfred Halpern's use of the phrase 'neo-Islamic totalitarianism' in his 1963 book The Politics of Social Change in the Middle East and North Africa, as a precursor to the concept of Islamofascism, in that he discusses Islamism as a new kind of fascism. Halpern's work, written in the midst of the Cold War and commissioned by the United States Air Force from the RAND Corporation, gives an analysis of the Muslim Brotherhood in Egypt, and argues that such Islamic movements were an obstacle to the military regimes who were in his view representatives of a new middle class capable of modernizing the Middle East.

==== Young Egypt Party ====
A more direct combination of a pro-Islamic and nationalist agenda, inspired by Benito Mussolini's Italian fascist movement and government, was the Young Egypt Party, a political party that operated between 1933 and 1953 within Egypt.

==== Post World War II ====
After nationalizing the Suez Canal in 1956, pan-Arab nationalist Egyptian president Gamal Abdel Nasser incensed United Kingdom's Prime Minister Anthony Eden, who reportedly told American President Dwight D. Eisenhower that Nasser was a ‘Hitler’ or ‘Muslim Mussolini’.

=== Advent of Islamism ===
In 1978, as Ruhollah Khomeini's Islamic revolution in Iran was gaining momentum, and intellectuals in France and elsewhere in the west were displaying enthusiasm for it, Maxime Rodinson, a Marxist scholar of Islam, pushed back, arguing that political Islamization in Iran and other places in the Islamic world was encouraging "a type of archaic fascism" where the state would enforce totalitarian moral policing and where Western-imported nationalism and socialism was recast in religious terms, eliminating their progressive side. Historically, foreign assaults on the core Islamic world—by Crusaders, Mongols, and Western imperialists—had led to impoverished masses reacting against their Westernized elites for their lack of traditional piety.

=== Popularisation after the September 2001 attacks ===
==== Origins of the popularization ====
The term used much more broadly in the wake of the September 11 attacks. Khalid Duran is often credited with first using the term "Islamofascism" to characterize Islamism, generally, as a doctrine that would compel both a state and its citizens to adopt the religion of Islam. Neo-conservative journalist Lulu Schwartz is regarded as the first Westerner to adopt the term and popularise it in the aftermath of the attack on the World Trade Center. In an article in The Spectator, Schwartz used it to describe the ideology of Osama Bin Laden. She defines it as the "use of the faith of Islam as a cover for totalitarian ideology" and alleges that various Islamist movements shares fundamental ideological features of fascism.

Accounts differ as to who popularized the linkage. President George Bush used the term Islamofascism briefly in 2005 during his presidency, and clarified that it was distinct from the religion of Islam. According to Safire, author Christopher Hitchens was responsible for its diffusion, while Valerie Scatamburlo d'Annibale argues that its popularization is due to the work of Eliot Cohen, former counselor to Condoleezza Rice, an influential neoconservative at the time. It circulated in neoconservative circles for some years after 2001 and the war on terror. After the arrest of Islamic terrorists suspected of preparing to blow up aircraft, Bush once more alluded to "Islamic Fascists".

==== Criticism ====
Use of the term has met with criticism. According to Fred Halliday, it was used to intimate that either all Muslims, or those Muslims who spoke of their social or political goals in terms of Islam, were fascists. In 2002, cultural historian Richard Webster stated that British interference in the early 20th century engendered a virulent antisemitism generally unknown to Islam, and Western writers such as Andrew Sullivan mischaracterized the "response of militant Islam to the continued interference by the West in Muslim affairs" as Islamofascism. Katha Pollitt, stating the principle that, "if you control the language, you control the debate", remarked that while the term looked "analytic", it was emotional and "intended to get us to think less and fear" more. David Gergen, former speechwriter for Richard Nixon, commented that the phrase "confuses more than it clarifies", for "Islamic fascism has no meaning" in the Arab world. Writers, critics and scholars such as Robert Wistrich, however, responded that the Muslim religion itself is fascistic. In 2007, Christopher Hitchens said that identifying certain Islamic sects, such as Salafism, with political fascism was not unique to Islam, e.g. Judeo-Nazi coined in the 1970s by Yeshayahu Leibowitz, editor of the Encyclopedia Hebraica, to characterize Jews settling in the West Bank and the linkage between fascism and Roman Catholicism in Spain and Croatia. Hitchens also stated that it was another form of what left-wing analysts considered clerical fascism, and applicable to certain extremist believers of multiple religions.

Usage of Islamofascism and the related term Islamic fascism increased for about a month during the run-up to the U.S. 2006 midterm elections, after then President George W. Bush talked about being at war with "Islamic fascists" in an August 2005 speech. The phrase was dropped from the president's vocabulary almost as quickly, according to Sheryl Gay Stolberg, after provoking a storm of protest from Muslims.

Critics call Islamofascism a conservative "buzzword." The term has also been seen to have been popularized by the counter-jihad movement. A number of Republicans, such as Rick Santorum, used it as shorthand for terrorists, and Donald Rumsfeld dismissed critics of the invasion of Iraq as appeasers of a "new type of fascism". In 2007, American writer Norman Podhoretz, while arguing that the United States was in the midst of World War III, identified Iran as the main center of the Islamofascist ideology, calling on the United States to bomb the country as "soon as logistically possible".

Ismael Hossein-zadeh criticized Bush's use of the term, calling it "offensive and inflammatory and, therefore, detrimental to international understanding and stability". He insists on a definition of fascism as "interventionist policies on behalf of corporate interests" during economic crisis, which require a "corresponding package of political fascism" that cracks down on civil liberties and democratic controls to manage unrest. He writes, "Radical movements and individuals of the Muslim world maybe called fundamentalist, populist, nationalist, or terrorist; but they cannot be called fascist", believing that the label itself served fascist corporate interests in the US who stood to benefit from "wars of aggression."

==== 2008 Homeland Security memo ====
In April 2008, the Associated Press reported that US federal agencies, including the State Department and the Department of Homeland Security, were advised to stop using the term Islamo-fascism in a fourteen-point memo issued by the Extremist Messaging Branch of the National Counterterrorism Center. The memo states: "We are communicating with, not confronting, our audiences. Don't insult or confuse them with pejorative terms such as 'Islamo-fascism,' which are considered offensive by many Muslims."

From 2014 to 2017, "journalists, bloggers and some academics" used the term to "equate" radical Islamism (particularly ISIS) with fascism, but by 2018 the term Islamofascism had "largely disappeared" from use in the world of policymakers in the US and other Western countries, according to Tamir Bar-on.

== Perspectives of Islamists on fascism ==
Islamist thinkers themselves have often denounced the idea that Islam does or should have any connection to Western ideologies like fascism. Since Islamists seek to unify the religion of Islam (for example, the establishment of a pan-Islamic state such as ISIS) rather than the unification of people based on their ethnicity or nationality, Islamists such as Hassan al-Banna have problems with nationalism.

In his manifesto Milestones, the Islamist theoretician Sayyid Qutb emphasized his belief that Islamists should never "propose similarities" between the Islamic and non-Islamic "system or manners" (including political systems):

to please them [non-Muslims] as some do today when they present Islam to the people under the names of `Islamic Democracy` or `Islamic Socialism,` or sometimes by saying that the current economic or political or legal systems in the world need not be changed except a little to be acceptable Islamically.

Qutb was mainly interested in the ideologies of democracy, nationalism and socialism that dominated his country and much of the Muslim world at the time since by the time his manifesto was written (1964), World War II was over and fascism was a defeated ideology.

He was adamant that there is no compromise to be made:

Islam ... is the only Divine way of life ... those who deviate from this system and want some other system, whether it be based on nationalism ... class struggle, or similar corrupt theories are truly enemies of mankind!

=== Hassan al-Banna on nationalism ===
The anti-Islamic writer Hamed Abdel-Samad stated in his book Islamic Fascism that Al-Banna's organization, the Muslim Brotherhood "had always eulogized the principles of Adolf Hitler and Benito Mussolini". Al-Banna compared pan-Germanism with pan-Islamism, but clarified that "it is not permissible to allow the racist factor to overpower the belief factor". The Muslim Brotherhood received a £5,000 payment from Nazi Germany in August 1939 to spread anti-British messaging, but any further relationship was terminated by the beginning of the war.

=== Ayatollah Khomeini on fascism ===
Writing during World War II, Ayatollah Ruhollah Khomeini criticized Adolf Hitler and the Nazi takeover of Poland, calling it "unjust and evil," and writing that "This Hitlerite mentality ... is one of the most poisonous and heinous products of the human mind."

After the Iranian Revolution, in an interview with Oriana Fallaci in the New York Times, Fallaci asked him about the "fanaticism" of some of his followers, the totality of the control which he had over the country, and the fact that "many people call you a dictator". Khomeini rejected the claim that his movement was fascist, saying that it was "unjust and unhuman to call me a dictator" and saying that "Fascism and Islamism are absolutely incompatible".

=== Impact of Julius Evola on Islamism ===
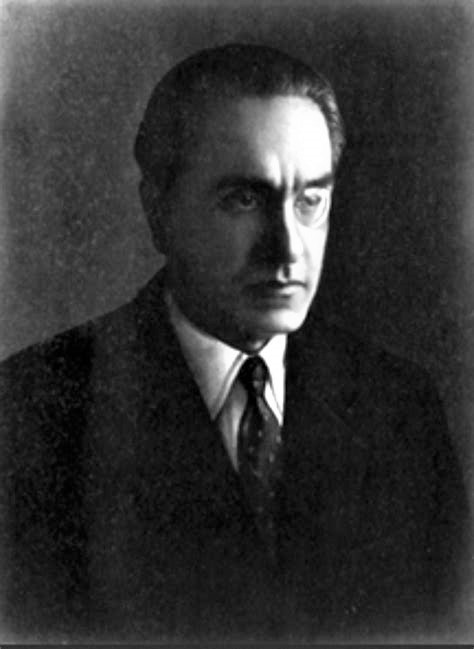
Italian fascist Julius Evola

Julius Evola (1898–1974) was an Italian philosopher and fascist writer who also had a high opinion of Islam and its future as a world power. He wrote many books and articles on tradition and modernity, supporting reactionary and traditionalist ideas. In Metaphysics of War, Evola comments on the philosophy of war in the Hindu, Islamic and Western traditions, describing the idea of jihad in Islam. In Evola's description of Islam, he praises its traditional morality and clear social roles. Evola characterized Islam as "a tradition at a higher level both Judaism and the religious beliefs that conquered the West." Evola's esotericist beliefs and praise of Islam have led Frank Gelli to accuse him of being a crypto-Sufi. Evola has been cited as an influence of the Russian Islamic activist Geydar Dzhemal.

In Revolt Against the Modern World, Evola writes

As in the case of priestly Judaism, the center in Islam also consisted of the Law and Tradition, regarded as a formative force, to which the Arab stocks of the origins provided a purer and nobler human material that was shaped by a warrior spirit.

Evola predicted a resurgence in Islam following the 1967 Arab–Israeli war, saying:

The Arabs are a great people, too, of course. Now they are in the dumps. Arab socialism does not suit them. It has sapped their energies. You can't mix atheism, Marxism and the Qur'an. The Arabs already have their own prophet in Muhammad. They'll never exchange Muhammad for Marx. ... Besides, Nasser has shown himself to be a dud. He deserved defeat. Arab socialism will die with him. There will soon be a resurgence of Islam. That is certain. Islam's worldwide advance has not stopped yet. ... When the time comes – I am sure it will be soon – they can restore the Caliphate. When the Islamic awakening comes, the Arabs will bounce back but not before.

Tunisian Hezbollah militant Fouad Saleh cited Evola during his trial, reading passages from Revolt Against the Modern World.

== Journalistic perspectives ==
The American journalist and former Nixon speechwriter William Safire wrote that the term fulfilled a need for a term to distinguish traditional Islam from terrorists: "Islamofascism may have legs: the compound defines those terrorists who profess a religious mission while embracing totalitarian methods and helps separate them from devout Muslims who want no part of terrorist means." Eric Margolis denied any resemblance between anything in the Muslim world, with its local loyalties and consensus decision-making and the historic, corporative-industrial states of the West. "The Muslim World", he argued, "is replete with brutal dictatorships, feudal monarchies, and corrupt military-run states, but none of these regimes, however deplorable, fits the standard definition of fascism. Most, in fact, are America's allies."

Malise Ruthven opposed redefining Islamism as "Islamofascism," a term whose usage has been "much abused". The Islamic label can be used for legitimizing and labeling a movement, but ideology must be distinguished from the brand name associated with it. The difference between Islamic movements and fascism are more "compelling" than the analogies. Islam defies doctrinal unification. No particular order of government can be deduced from Islamic texts, any more than from Christianity. Spanish fascists drew support from traditional Catholic doctrines, but by the same token, other Catholic thinkers have defended democracy in terms of the same theological traditions.

== Scholarly perspective ==
The widespread use in mass media of the term "Islamofascism" has been challenged as confusing because of its conceptual fuzziness. A number of scholars and thinkers, such as Michel Onfray, Michael Howard, Jeffrey Herf, Walter Laqueur, and Robert Wistrich have argued that the link between fascism and Islam/Islamic radicalism is sound. Aslan 2010, pp. 25–6:"It has more in common with the Bolsheviks and the French revolutionaries than it does with militant Muslim nationalist groups such as Hamas and Hizballah. To talk about Jihadism as Islamofascism is to misunderstand both Jihadism and fascism. Historians like Niall Ferguson dismiss the word as an "extraordinary neologism" positing a conceptual analogy when there is "virtually no overlap between the ideology of al Qaeda and fascism". Some scholars have compared the tactics, conspiratorial thinking, and recruitment styles of white supremacists and radical Islamic terrorists, asserting that while they have different ideologies, they have "structurally very similar modes of thought".

Walter Laqueur, after reviewing this and related terms, concluded that "Islamic fascism, Islamophobia and antisemitism, each in its way, are imprecise terms we could well do without but it is doubtful whether they can be removed from our political lexicon."

=== Support ===
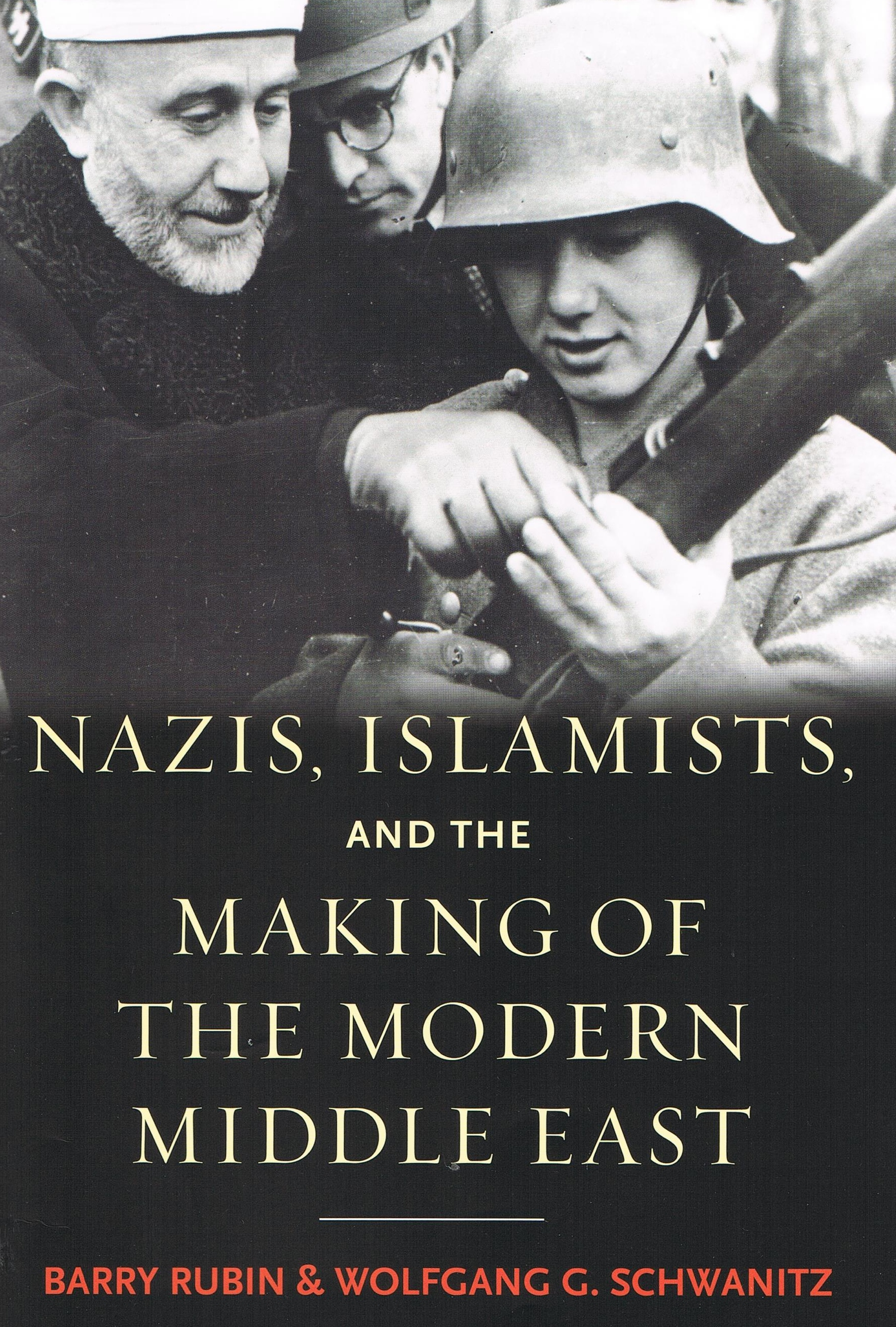
Cover of the book of Barry Rubin and Wolfgang G. Schwanitz, Nazis, Islamists, and the Making of the Modern Middle East (2014). According to the authors, there is a nexus between Nazism and Islamism and the vector would have been Amin al-Husseini (left).

Some of the liberal public intellectuals accused (by Tony Judt) of being supporters of the concept following the 9/11 attacks are Adam Michnik, Oriana Fallaci; Václav Havel; André Glucksmann, Michael Ignatieff, Leon Wieseltier, David Remnick, Thomas Friedman and Michael Walzer.

Manfred Halpern, the first major thinker to characterize politicized Islam as a fascist movement, called it "Neo-Islamic Totalitarianism" in his classic 1963 study The Politics of Social Change in the Middle East and North Africa.

The French Marxist Maxime Rodinson described Islamic movements such as the Muslim Brotherhood as a "type of archaic fascism" whose goal was the establishment of a "totalitarian state whose political police would brutally enforce the moral and social order." He accused the French left of celebrating in Islamism a religious form of fascism.

Professor David Meir-Levi wrote in his book History Upside Down that Islamofascism was "a guarantor of the movement of the destruction of Israel," and that the Palestinian cause had become "part of the Islamofascist jihad against the West."

The sociologist Saïd Amir Arjomand has argued that since 1984 (at least in Iran) Islamism and fascism share essential features, an argument he made at some length in his 1989 book The Turban for the Crown: The Islamic Revolution in Iran.

Tamir Bar-On writes that "while Islamism and fascism are different political ideologies with differing visions of human nature, the ideal state, and historical processes, both ideologies share the quest for totalitarianism. Both Islamism and fascism mobilize the masses, ignoring class distinctions, in order to combat internal or external threats. As Michael Whine explains, both replace the practice of religion with their own monopolistic ideology, relying on mass communication and suppression of dissent in order to construct a single party regime, a new state with the vision of a 'new man', and the aim of conquering existing society, which it believes has deviated from its ideal."

=== Criticism ===
The use of the term "Islamofascism" has been criticized by several scholars and journalists for being "ahistorical and simplistic" (Tony Judt): incriminating an entire religion (Alan Colmes); lacking in scholarly precision (Robert Paxton); "politically biased and polemical" (Stefan Wild); and for being used in "right-wing circles ... to help spread the alarming notion that all Islamists—ranging from the Sunni insurgents and Shiite militias of Iraq to Osama bin Laden to the mullahs of Iran to angry Palestinians—are part of a single, terrifying threat on the order of Nazi Germany" (by The Week);

While Islamic Fascism has been discussed as a category of serious analysis by the scholars mentioned above, the term "Islamofascism" circulated mainly as a propaganda, rather than as an analytic term after the September 11 attacks on the United States in September 2001. It also gained a foothold in more sober political discourse, both academic and pseudo-academic. Many critics are dismissive, variously branding it as "meaningless" (Daniel Benjamin); a "figment of the neocon imagination" (Paul Krugman); and as betraying an ignorance of both Islam and Fascism (Angelo Codevilla).

Judt, in an analysis of liberal acquiescence in President George W. Bush's foreign policy initiatives, particularly the war on terror and the invasion of Iraq, argued that this policy was premised on the notion there was such a thing as Islamofascism, a notion Judt considered catastrophic. In his diagnosis of this shift, he detected a decline in the old liberal consensus of American politics, and what he called the "deliquescence of the Democratic Party". According to Judt, many former left-liberal pundits, like Paul Berman and Peter Beinart, had no knowledge of the Middle East or cultures like those of Wahhabism and Sufism on which they descant authoritatively. They latched onto the war on terror as a new version of the old liberal fight against fascism, in the form of Islamofascism. In their approach, there is a cozy acceptance of a binary division of the world into ideological antitheses, and the "familiar juxtaposition that eliminates exotic complexity and confusion: Democracy v. Totalitarianism, Freedom v. Fascism, Them v. Us" has been revived. Christopher Hitchens was also criticized by Judt as making unhistoric simplifications to justify use of the term. Niall Ferguson similarly characterized the term as a "caricatured World War II idiom" which frames opponents as appeasers of fascists.

== See also ==
- Arab fascism
- Clerical fascism
- Christian fascism
- Islam and violence
- Neo-orientalism
- Orientalism
- Oriental despotism
- Red–green–brown alliance
- White jihad
