= Lee So-yeon =

Lee So-yeon or Soyeon Lee, also romanized as Yi So-yeon, may refer to:

- Lee So-yeon (defector) (born c. 1976), North Korean defector to South Korea
- Lee So-yeon (actress) (born 1982), South Korean actress
- Lee So-yeon (judoka) (born 1981), South Korean judoka
- Lee So-yeon (short track speed skater) (born 1993), South Korean short track speed skater, active since 2012
- Lee So-yeon (speed skater) (born 1985), South Korean long track speed skater, active between 2001 and 2010
- Soyeon Kate Lee (born 1979), Korean-American pianist
- Yi So-Yeon (born 1978), South Korean astronaut

== See also ==
- Soo Yeon Lee (born 1984), South Korean table tennis player
- Y:SY (born Lee Seo-yeon, 2000), South Korean singer
