= Ian Boyd =

Ian Boyd may refer to:

- Ian Boyd (athlete) (born 1933), British middle-distance runner
- Ian L. Boyd (born 1957), Scottish zoologist and Chief Scientific Adviser at Defra
- Ian Boyd (academic) (1935–2024), Canadian scholar of literature and religion
