= Middle East Studies Association =

Learned society

- Abbreviation: MESA
- Formation: 1966
- Type: Learned society
- Location: Tucson, Arizona
- President: Aslı Ü. Bâli
- Website: mesana.org

Middle East Studies Association (often referred to as MESA) is a learned society, and according to its website, "a non-profit association that fosters the study of the Middle East, promotes high standards of scholarship and teaching, and encourages public understanding of the region and its peoples through programs, publications and services that enhance education, further intellectual exchange, recognize professional distinction, and defend academic freedom".

Some critics have accused MESA of politicization and being dominated by academics critical of Israel and the United States. In 2007, the Association for the Study of the Middle East and Africa was founded as an ideological counterweight to MESA.

== History ==
MESA was founded in 1966 with 51 original members. Its current membership exceeds 2,700 and it "serves as an umbrella organization for more than fifty institutional members and thirty-six affiliated organizations". It is a constituent society of the American Council of Learned Societies and the National Council of Area Studies Associations, and a member of the National Humanities Alliance.

In 2007, Bernard Lewis and Fouad Ajami started Association for the Study of the Middle East and Africa (ASMEA) as a rival to MESA, as they saw MESA as "dominated by academics who have been critical of Israel and of America's role in the Middle East."

In mid-March 2022, MESA voted by a margin of 787 to 167 to join the Boycott, Divestment and Sanctions (BDS) movement to hold Israel to account for alleged human rights abuses against the Palestinians. MESA's decision was criticised by the Academic Engagement Network, the AMCHA Initiative, and ASMEA.

From 2019 to 2023, MESA was headquartered at George Mason University. It is now based in an office in Tucson, Arizona.

== Publications ==
The International Journal of Middle East Studies (IJMES) is a quarterly journal published by Cambridge University Press under the auspices of MESA. The editor is Joel Gordon of University of Arkansas.

The Review of Middle East Studies (RoMES) is MESA's journal of review. MESA policy has established the focus of RoMES as the state of the craft in all fields of Middle East studies. The Editor is Heather Ferguson and the journal is based at Claremont McKenna College.

MESA has a very active Committee on Academic Freedom (CAF) that has two wings: CAFMENA (Middle East and North Africa, established in 1990) and CAFNA (North America, established in 2005). Through CAF, MESA monitors infringements on academic freedom on the Middle East and North Africa worldwide.

== Awards ==
Since 1991, MESA has awarded the Albert Hourani Book Award to recognize "the very best in Middle East studies scholarship". The prize is named after Albert Hourani, "to recognize his long and distinguished career as teacher and mentor". The Albert Hourani Book Award is an award honoring scholarly non-fiction books, given by the Middle East Studies Association of North America (MESA) to "recognize outstanding publishing in Middle East studies" and to honor work "that exemplifies scholarly excellence and clarity of presentation in the tradition of Albert Hourani", the distinguished scholar of Arab and Islamic history. On occasion two authors have shared the year's award; in some years, the society has given honorable mention distinctions. MESA first gave the award in 1991.

The Roger Owen Book Award, first given in 2011, recognizes the very best in economics, economic history, or the political economy of the Middle East and North Africa scholarship. The award honors Roger Owen for his long and distinguished career and scholarly contributions. The biennial award is given in odd-numbered years

The Fatema Mernissi Book Award was established in 2017 to recognize outstanding scholarship in studies of gender, sexuality, and women’s lived experience. The annual award was named for Fatema Mernissi to recognize her long and distinguished career as a scholar and as a public intellectual.

The Nikki Keddie Book Award was established in 2017 to recognize outstanding scholarly work in the area of religion, revolution, and/or society. The annual award was named for Nikki Keddie to recognize her long and distinguished career as a scholar and teacher.

The MESA Dissertation Awards were established in 1982 to recognize exceptional achievement in research and writing for/of dissertations in Middle East studies. In 1984 the award was named for Malcolm H. Kerr to honor his significant contributions to Middle East studies. Awards are given in two categories: Social Sciences and Humanities.

Since 1997, Jere L. Bacharach Service Award has recognized the contributions of individuals through their outstanding service to MESA or the profession. Service is defined broadly to include work in diverse areas, including but not limited to outreach, librarianship, and film.

== Former presidents ==
The following persons have been presidents of the association:

- 2024–25 Aslı Ü. Bâli
- 2022–23 Eve M. Troutt Powell
- 2020–21 Dina Rizk Khoury
- 2018–19 Judith E. Tucker
- 2016–17 Beth Baron
- 2014–15 Nathan Brown
- 2013 Peter Sluglett
- 2012 Fred Donner
- 2011 Suad Joseph
- 2010 Roger M.A. Allen
- 2009 Virginia Aksan
- 2008 Mervat Hatem
- 2007 Zachary Lockman
- 2006 Juan Cole
- 2005 Ali Banuazizi
- 2004 Laurie Brand
- 2003 Lisa Anderson
- 2002 Joel Beinin
- 2001 R. Stephen Humphreys
- 2000 Jere L. Bacharach
- 1999 Barbara Stowasser
- 1998 Philip S. Khoury
- 1997 Leila Fawaz
- 1996 Farhad Kazemi
- 1995 Ann M. Lesch
- 1994 Rashid I. Khalidi
- 1993 John O. Voll
- 1992 Barbara Aswad
- 1991 Dale F. Eickelman
- 1990 Yvonne Y. Haddad
- 1989 John L. Esposito
- 1988 William B. Quandt
- 1987 Michael C. Hudson
- 1986 Elizabeth W. Fernea
- 1985 Kemal Karpat
- 1984 Ira M. Lapidus
- 1983 Richard T. Antoun
- 1982 I. William Zartman
- 1981 Nikki R. Keddie
- 1980 Farhat Ziadeh
- 1979 Afaf Lutfi al‐Sayyid Marsot
- 1978 Wilfred Cantwell Smith
- 1977 George Makdisi
- 1976 L. Carl Brown
- 1975 Roderic H. Davison
- 1974 Leonard Binder
- 1973 Charles Issawi
- 1972 Malcolm H. Kerr
- 1971 John S. Badeau
- 1970 William M. Brinner
- 1969 R. Bayly Winder
- 1968 George Hourani
- 1967 Morroe Berger
- 1966 G.E. von Grunebaum (Honorary)
