= Lee Hyeon-seo =

North Korean defector (born 1980)

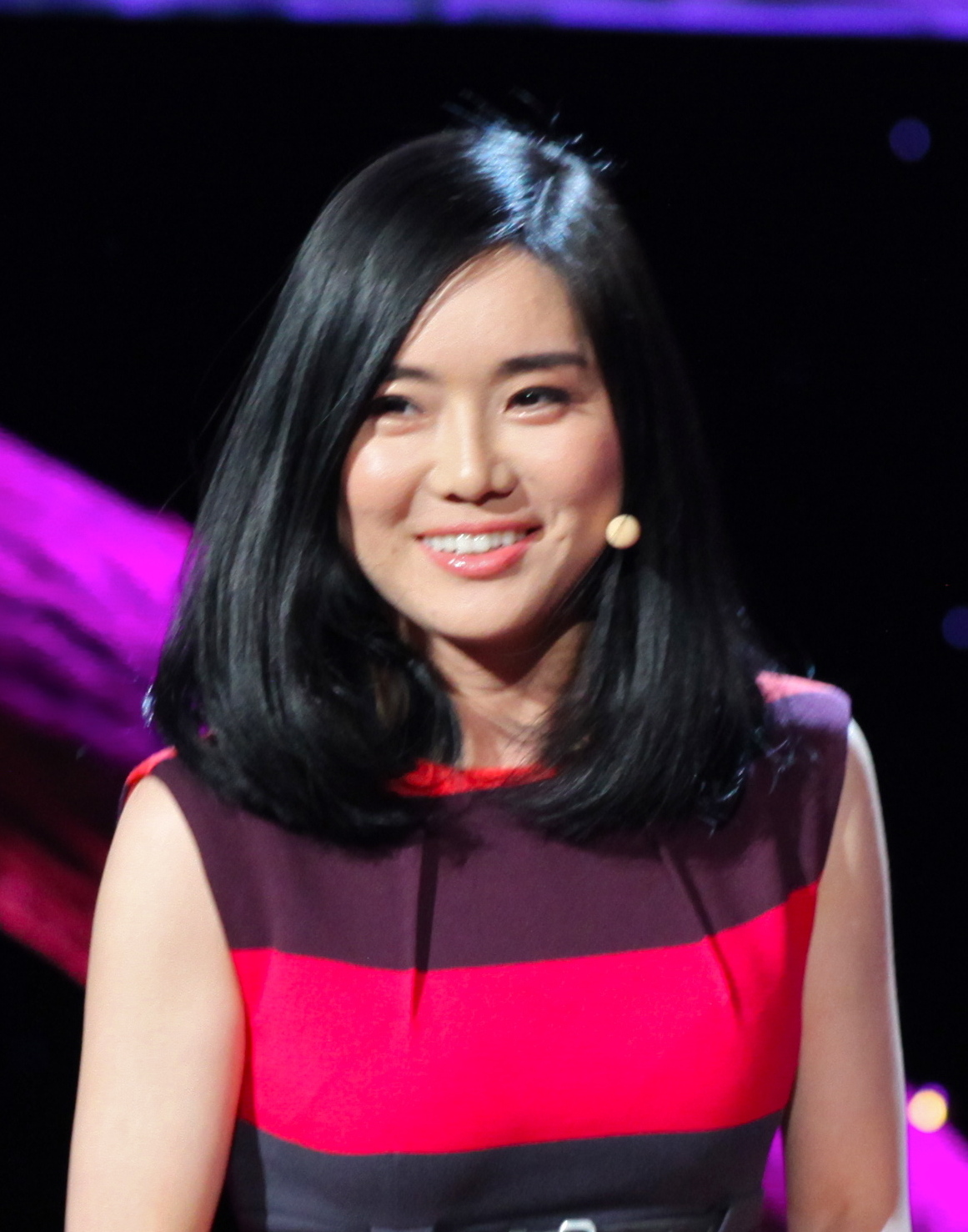
- Hyeonseo Lee at the TED2013 conference
- Born: Kim Ji-hae; January 1980 (age 46); Hyesan, Ryanggang Province, North Korea
- Citizenship: South Korea
- Education: Hankuk University of Foreign Studies
- Occupations: Author; Human Rights Activist
- Known for: Defection from North Korea

Lee Hyeon-seo (Korean: 이현서, born January 1980), best known for her book, The Girl with Seven Names, is a North Korean defector and activist who lives in Seoul, South Korea. She escaped from North Korea and later guided her family out of North Korea through China and Laos.

== Early life in North Korea ==
Lee Hyeon-seo grew up in Hyesan, North Korea. Lee explained in her TED talk in February 2013 that "When I was young, I thought my country was the best on the planet ... I grew up singing a song called 'Nothing to Envy'. I felt very proud. I thought my life in North Korea was normal, even though when I was seven years old, I saw my first public execution." Her family was not poor, but after the North Korean famine struck in the 1990s, she witnessed much suffering and death.

== Escape ==
=== China ===
In 1997, Lee crossed the frozen Yalu River alone in collusion with a friendly border guard to fulfill a dream she had, only planning to stay a short while before returning. However, due to complications with the North Korean security police, she had to live with relatives in China as an illegal immigrant. She managed to buy the identity of a mentally challenged girl from Heilongjiang, and with it, obtained a passport and driver's license. At one point, after being accused of being North Korean, she was interrogated by police and tested on her Chinese and her knowledge of China. Because of her father's insistence from her childhood days that she learn Chinese, she passed the test.

=== South Korea ===
After 10 years of being a fugitive in China, Lee managed to escape to South Korea. Arriving at Incheon International Airport in January 2008, she entered the immigration office and declared her identity as a North Korean asylum-seeker. She "was quickly ushered into another room", where officials inspected her papers, asked her if she was actually Chinese, and informed her that she would be incarcerated for an unspecified period of time and then deported back to China if she violated Korean law, and that if the Chinese government learned that she was not actually a Chinese citizen, she would be jailed, heavily fined, and then deported again back to North Korea.

She asked them to call the National Intelligence Service, which three hours later drove her into downtown Seoul.

She was put through an orientation course for life in South Korea, and then given a house to live in. She "started out with mixed feelings of fear and excitement, but settling down turned out to be far more challenging than I had expected. I realized there was a wide gap between North and South, ranging from educational background to cultural and linguistic differences. We are a racially homogeneous people on the outside, but inside we have become very different as a result of the 67 years of division."

She endured anti-North Korean prejudice and sometimes thought it would be much easier to return to China. After "a year of confusion and disorder", she "finally managed to find meaning in [her] new life".

== Family escape ==
Lee received word that North Korean police had intercepted money she had sent to her family through a broker and that her mother and brother were going to be forcibly removed to a desolate location in the countryside. Lee agonized for a while and decided to go back for them, knowing that neither could speak or understand Chinese. She returned to China and met her family in Changbai as her brother helped her mother over the border into China.

She then guided them on a 2000-mile trip through China, during which they were almost caught several times. At one point, when they were stopped and interrogated by a police officer, Lee told him that her family, who could not understand Chinese, were deaf and mute people that she was chaperoning. The police officer accepted the story and let them pass. At the Lao border, Lee met a broker and paid him to take her mother and brother across and to the South Korean Embassy in Vientiane. On her way to an airport in China to fly back to South Korea, however, she was informed that her mother and brother had been caught as they crossed the border.

She then traveled to Luang Namtha, Laos, where she paid a bribe and fine. After a month of ordeals, her family members were released. She traveled with them to Vientiane, where her family members were arrested and jailed again, a short distance from the South Korean embassy. Lee went back and forth between the immigration office and the National Police Agency for almost 50 days, "desperately trying to get my family out ... but I didn't have enough money to pay the bribes. I lost all hope."

To her luck, an English-speaking stranger – who was identified in her autobiography as an affable Australian named Dick Stolp – asked her "What's wrong?" She explained with the use of a dictionary that the man went to the ATM and paid the rest of the money for her family and two other North Koreans to get out of jail. When she asked, "Why are you helping me?" he replied, "I'm not helping you ... I'm helping the North Korean people." Lee described this as a symbolic moment in her life, with the man serving as a symbol of "new hope for me and other North Koreans ... He showed me that the kindness of strangers and the support of the international community are truly the rays of hope that the North Korean people need."

She later said that this encounter marked the moment "when my view of the world changed and I realized there were many good people on this planet. I also realized how precious life is." Soon she and her family were living in South Korea.

== Current life ==
In 2011, Lee wrote that she was learning English "to boost [her] prospects", noting that North Koreans' "lack of English is a handicap" on the job market. In China, she had devoted a great deal of time to learn Chinese, but "never thought I would be under this much stress about language in South Korea". She worked part-time and took accounting classes at different institutes and obtained the certifications needed for work. In 2011, she was "admitted to the Chinese language department of the Hankuk University of Foreign Studies (by special admission). [She] chose the language as [her] major hoping that [she] would be able to take part in ever increasing trade with China."

She noted that she was "working at South Korea's Ministry of Unification as a student journalist alongside South Korean college students. [She wrote] articles about the relationship between North and South Korea as well as the possibility for reunification." In addition, she was one of "50 college students who had escaped from North Korea for the 'English for the Future' program sponsored by the British Embassy in Seoul, which helps [her] keep up [her] English studies."

She was doing volunteer work "out of gratitude for all the aid [she has] received since [she] came here and of hope to return the favor to other people in need." As of May 2014, Lee was still studying at the Hankuk University of Foreign Studies and working as a student journalist with the Ministry of Unification.

In 2022, the parents of Otto Warmbier awarded a scholarship named after their son to Lee.

=== Activist work ===
Lee spoke about her experiences at a TED conference in Long Beach, California, in February 2013. The YouTube video of her talk has received over 21 million views.

In May 2013, Lee appeared on an Australian TV program on which she was reunited with the stranger who had helped her in Vientiane in 2009, Australian Dick Stolp. "I was really happy", said Lee. "He says, 'I'm not a hero', but I say he is a modern hero." Stolp said: "You help a small hand and it reaches to other hands and you think, 'That's great, that's good stuff.' ... I'm meeting someone who is now doing good things, and inside I can't help but feel 'Hey! I helped this lady to go out and change her life.'" She has been interviewed by the BBC, CNN, CBS News, and many other TV and radio outlets around the world.

She spoke at the Oslo Freedom Forum in May 2014.

Lee was an executive producer on the documentary Beyond Utopia about South Korean pastor Kim Sungeun, who helps North Koreans defect. It aired on PBS January 9, 2024.
