= Richard T. Antoun =

Professor of Anthropology

- Born: March 31, 1932; Worcester, Massachusetts
- Died: December 4, 2009 (aged 77); Vestal, New York
- Cause of death: Stabbing
- Other name: Dick
- Education: Williams College (BA; 1953); Johns Hopkins University (MA; 1955); Harvard University (Ph.D.; 1963)
- Occupations: Professor Emeritus of Anthropology
- Employer: Binghamton University
- Spouse: Rosalyn "Roz" Antoun; employee of the Jewish Federation
- Children: Nicholas Antoun

Richard T. "Dick" Antoun (March 31, 1932, in Worcester, Massachusetts – December 4, 2009, in Vestal, New York) was a professor of anthropology at Binghamton University who specialized in Islamic and Middle Eastern studies.

His work centered on religion and the social organization of tradition in Islamic law and ethics, among other things. He was stabbed to death in his office at Binghamton University in December 2009; a Saudi graduate student pleaded guilty to killing him, and was sentenced to 15 years in prison.

== Education and academic work ==
Antoun grew up in Shrewsbury, Massachusetts, graduating from Shrewsbury High School in 1949. He received his BA from Williams College (1953; History), his MA from Johns Hopkins University (1955; International Relations), and his Ph.D. from Harvard University (1963; Anthropology and Middle Eastern studies; thesis on "Kufr al-Ma: A Village in Jordan, A Study of Social Structure and Social Control").

In October 1959 Antoun began his career with ethnographic field work in Jordan. Over the next four decades, he lived intermittently in Kufr al-Ma—a small Sunni Muslim village—studying the Qur'an with the local self-educated preacher. He also did field work in Beirut, Lebanon (1965 and 1966), Gorgan, Iran (1971 and 1972), and Katerini, Greece (1993).

During his career he taught at the Manchester University in England (1960–62), Harvard University (1963), Indiana University (1963–70), American University of Beirut (1965–67), Binghamton University (1970–2009), University of Chicago (1977), and Cairo University (1989).

At Binghamton he became the Bartle Professor of Anthropology. He was "a sociocultural anthropologist who conducted research among peasants in Jordan, urbanites in Lebanon, peasant farmers in Iran, and migrants in Texas and Greece". In 1981 he was elected President of the Middle East Studies Association of North America. In 1999, he became emeritus, and continued to conduct research and hold an office on campus.

== Murder ==
Binghamton University campus police were called to Antoun's office at 1:41 p.m. on December 4, 2009. Antoun, 77 years old at the time, had been stabbed four times in the chest with a 6-inch kitchen blade while in his office, suffered a punctured lung, and died.

The suspect was still in the university's Science 1 building when police arrived; they tackled the suspect, and frisked him. When they inquired about Antoun, witnesses said he replied, "Yeah, I just stabbed him." The knife used in the stabbing was later recovered.

The suspect, Abdulsalam S. al-Zahrani, was a 46-year-old Binghamton University cultural anthropology graduate student from Saudi Arabia. Antoun had worked with al-Zahrani, and had known him for quite some time. Antoun served on the three-person doctoral dissertation committee that was to judge al-Zahrani's dissertation on "Sacred Voice, Profane Sight: The Senses, Cosmology, and Epistemology in Early Arabic Culture", (see external link below for related article).

Prior to the incident he was well-respected and liked but struggled to cope with Islamophobia. One of al-Zahrani's roommates, Souleymane Sakho, who lived with him for three weeks, said of him, "I said he was acting oddly, like a terrorist. He was all the time shouting in Arabic, shouting threats, insulting this country for no reason".

=== Al-Zahrani legal proceedings and guilty plea ===
After his arraignment, al-Zahrani was charged with second-degree murder, and held without bail at the Broome County Sheriff's Correctional Facility. The Saudi Gazette reported that the Saudi Consulate in New York retained a lawyer to represent al-Zahrani. New York City lawyer Frederica L. Miller represented him. Members of the consulate met with Al-Zahrani, and the consulate was in touch with his family, including one relative who lived in the US.

Senator Charles Schumer followed the case, and was in touch with the District Attorney's office. Schumer said: "We have to make sure it's not like the situation ... where this person flees the county. The law enforcement authority says they're keeping a careful eye there."

On January 22, 2010, al-Zahrani was indicted by a grand jury in Broome County Court for intentionally stabbing and killing Antoun, and charged with second degree murder. A conviction of second-degree murder would carry a minimum sentence of 15 years to life, and a maximum of 25 years to life, under New York statutes. Al-Zahrani remained in Broome County jail without bail. His legal expenses were paid by the Saudi Consulate.

On February 4, 2010, al-Zahrani pleaded not guilty to one felony count of second-degree murder, and declined a bail hearing before Broome County Judge Martin E. Smith.

Al-Zahrani's attorney wrote in a notice of intent to use psychiatric evidence that she filed in Broome County Court on July 21, 2010, that psychiatric evidence would show he lacked substantial capacity to know or appreciate the nature and consequences of his conduct, and was "psychotic and suffering from a longstanding major mental illness, schizoaffective disorder." Evidence was to include testimony from the defense's medical experts, Steven Simring and Charles Patrick Ewing.

A competency hearing was held after mental health professionals concluded that al-Zahrani was mentally incompetent to understand his charge or be tried. On February 22, 2011, Broome County Judge Joseph F. Cawley Jr. ordered Al-Zahrani be placed in the custody of a state psychiatric facility for treatment, until he was deemed mentally competent to be tried. No new trial date was set, and the order was good for up to year. Al-Zahrani was to go on trial when deemed mentally competent.

Al-Zahrani pleaded guilty on May 20, 2011, to one felony count of first-degree manslaughter, and agreed not to appeal his sentence. In September 2011 he was sentenced in Broome County Court to 15 years in prison. He was released in October 2022 and was deported to Saudi Arabia after serving his prison sentence.

== Publications ==
=== Major works ===
Antoun left behind a legacy in his writings. He wrote Understanding Fundamentalism: Christian, Islamic and Jewish Movements in 2001; the book came out just before the September 11 attacks. Sally K. Gallagher reviewed it for Sociology of Religion, writing that the book: "is a readable overview and introduction to how conservative elites and communities in three monotheistic religious traditions orient themselves to modernity." Peter A. Huff, reviewing it, said that Antoun wrote about how:

his presence [in the village] became increasingly problematic as the climate of the cultural environment dramatically changed. Dialogue turned argumentative, and outspoken villagers, especially young men, attempted to convert him to Islam. From Antoun's perspective, he was witnessing the birth of a local strain of fundamentalism.

Scott R. Appleby, reviewing it for the Middle East Quarterly, wrote: "There is much to commend in this general and accessible overview".

Antoun later wrote Documenting Transnational Migration: Jordanian Men Working and Studying in Europe, Asia and North America, published in 2005. Ronald R. Stockton, writing in The Middle East Journal, described Antoun's examination of the sons of a Jordanian village who had been sent abroad and returned:

He found a range of experiences, many different from what one might expect ... Some findings are surprising, for example, comparing Jordanians in the Gulf with those in Pakistan or the West. Jordanians share language and culture with the Gulf but were "encapsulated in residence, work, and leisure activities" and saw "surprisingly little of the indigenous inhabitants"... In Pakistan, because they did not speak Urdu, they were isolated and restricted to campus life. The Pakistani family structure also made it difficult to meet local women. ... In the West, in spite of religious and cultural differences, they found it easier to meet local people. Greece was the most open society they encountered. ... The students "acculturated rapidly, and assimilated to Greek society and culture".... Six of the nine married Greek women, four settling permanently in Greece. In Pakistan only one of 27 married a Pakistani. In Saudi Arabia the number was zero.

=== Select other publications ===
- "Institutionalized deconfrontation: A case study of conflict resolution among tribal peasants in Jordan," in Conflict Resolution in The Arab World, ed. by P. Salem., American University of Beirut, 1997.
- "The Case of the Lost Tooth," in How People Negotiate: Resolving Disputes in Different Cultures, edited by Guy Oliver Faure, Kluwer Academic Publishers, 2003.
- "Fundamentalism, Bureaucratization, and the State's Co-optation of Religion: A Jordanian Case Study", The International Journal of Middle East Studies, Vol. 38, No. 3, August 2006.

== See also ==
- List of Williams College people
