= Judith E. Tucker =

Middle east studies professor

Judith E. Tucker is a professor of history at Georgetown University. She was the editor-in-chief of the International Journal of Middle East Studies from 2004 until 2009. She is a past president of the Middle East Studies Association of North America.

== Education and career ==
Tucker grew up in Connecticut and was first introduced to Middle East studies through reading 1001 Nights. She has a B.A. from Radcliffe College and an M.A. from Harvard University. She earned her Ph.D. from Harvard University in 1981, and started at Georgetown University in 1983 as an assistant professor. From 2004 to 2009 Tucker was the editor-in-chief of the International Journal of Middle East Studies. Tucker was president of the Middle East Studies Association from 2017 until 2020.

== Selected publications ==
- Tucker, Judith E; American Historical Association (1993). Gender and Islamic history. Washington, D.C.: American Historical Association. ISBN 978-0-87229-070-9. OCLC 458761283.
- Tucker, Judith E (2010). In the house of the law gender and Islamic law in Ottoman Syria and Palestine. Berkeley, Calif: California Univ. Press. ISBN 978-0-520-22474-2. OCLC 934970172.
- Tucker, Judith E (2008). Women, family, and gender in Islamic law. Cambridge, UK: Cambridge University Press. ISBN 978-0-511-43777-9. OCLC 473590856.
- Tucker, Judith E. (1985). Women in Nineteenth-Century Egypt. Cambridge University Press. doi:10.1017/CBO9780511583506. ISBN 978-0-521-31420-6.
  - reviewed in Islamic Law and Society

== Honors and awards ==
Tucker was named a distinguished lecturer in 2012 by the Journal of Middle East Women's Studies.

== Personal life ==
Tucker and her husband, Sharif Elmusa, met in graduate school and they have two children.
