= John Voll =

John Voll may refer to:

- John J. Voll, United States Air Force officer and World War II flying ace
- John Obert Voll, American scholar of Islam
