= Asaf Romirowsky =

American historian and political commentator

Asaf Romirowsky (Hebrew: אסף רומירובסקי) is an American historian of the Middle East and political commentator. He is the executive director of Scholars for Peace in the Middle East (SPME) and the executive director of the Association for the Study of the Middle East and Africa (ASMEA).

== Biography ==
Asaf Romirowsky holds a BA from the Hebrew University of Jerusalem, a master's degree from Villanova University and a doctorate from King's College London.

Professor Bernard Lewis and Professor Fouad Ajami co-founded the Association for the Study of the Middle East and Africa as an ideological counterweight to the Middle East Studies Association and has been its director since the learned society's inception. According to Romirowsky, anti-Israeli, pro-BDS views were cascading through academic departments and there was a problem of a biased narrative presented on college campuses. He is also the executive director of Scholars for Peace in the Middle East (SPME).

Romirowsky's publicly-engaged scholarship has been featured in The Wall Street Journal, The National Interest, The American Interest, The New Republic, The Times of Israel, Jerusalem Post, Ynet and Tablet among other online and print media outlets.

In late 2007, his invitation to take part in an academic panel at the University of Delaware was rescinded by student organizers after another member of the panel, political science professor Muqtedar Khan, objected to sharing a podium with a former Israeli soldier.

=== Works ===
In 2013, Romirowsky co-authored with Alexander H. Joffe the book Religion, Politics, and the Origins of Palestine Refugee Relief (Palgrave Macmillan). The book examined the origins of UNRWA in the endorsement by the British authorities in Mandatory Palestine of efforts by the American Friends Service Committee to assist Arab refugees during and after the 1947–1949 Palestine war. Romirowsky and Joffe argue that the UNRWA's attitude towards Israel is rooted in the "foundational belief" of the American Friends Service Committee "in a supersessionist Christianity that could not reconcile the possibility of a rebirth of Jewish nationhood in the Land of Israel."

With Donna Robinson Divine of Smith College, Romirowsky edited October 7: The Wars Over Words and Deeds published by Academic Studies Press in 2025. The collection of essays examines the impact of the October 7 attack on Israel, focusing on how the event shaped global debates, media coverage, campus discussions, and political movements surrounding the Israeli-Palestinian conflict. A review by the Jewish Book Council noted that "One of the strengths of the book is in its copious footnoting of sources. Though readers might disagree with the tone or even conclusions of some of the essays, one cannot fault the editors' methods."

Romirowsky is a contributor to The Case Against Academic Boycotts of Israel.

== Views ==
In 2019, Romirowsky and Miriam Elman attributed "a significant growth in the normalization of antisemitism" to the impact of the BDS movement.

Romirowsky is a critic of Palestinian political violence.

Romirowsky believes that UNRWA is an "anomaly within the world of refugee relief" and that it encourages the refugees it cares for towards terrorism and intransigence.

Romirowsky favors limiting the definition of who is a Palestinian refugee so that descendants of those who fled or were expelled by Israel during the 1948 war would not be counted as refugees. Marouf Hasian Jr. criticizes Romirowsky by arguing that he is minimizing the existential dangers facing the Palestinians by complaining about how UNRWA categorizes refugees. According to him, Romirowsky's message is that "happy and carefree generations of Palestinians don't mind being refugees, and the UNRWA revels in its role as dispenser of aid" which he thinks is false.

== Sources ==
- Guttman, Nathan (August 8, 2014). "Despite Gaza Bombings, U.N. Agency Wins Respect From Israel". The Forward.
- Wisse, Ruth (November 21, 2011). "The Suicidal Passion". Washington Examiner.
- Guttman, Nathan (June 12, 2012). "U.S. Senate Wades Into Thorny 'Refugee' Question". The Forward.
- Hasian, Marouf Jr. (31 March 2016). Israel's Military Operations in Gaza: Telegenic Lawfare and Warfare. Routledge. pp. 194–. ISBN 978-1-317-29863-2.
