= Alexander Boot =

Russian academic and writer (born 1948)

- Born: 1947 (age 78–79); Moscow, Soviet Union
- Occupations: Lecturer, advertising executive, writer
- Children: Max Boot
- Writing career
- Language: Russian, English
- Notable works: How the West Was Lost (2006); God and Man According to Tolstoy (2009); The Crisis Behind Our Crisis (2011)

Alexander Boot (born 1948) is a Russian-born writer of books and articles, previously a university lecturer and an advertising executive. His work promotes traditionalist conservatism and European culture.

== Early life ==
Born in 1948 in Moscow, Boot grew up there in the years following the Second World War. He is of Jewish ancestry, and his father had spent much of the war as a prisoner of war of the Germans. However, Boot's father survived to bribe the doctor of the Institute of Modern Languages to gain admission for his son, who was "clever but lazy".

After graduating from the Moscow State University, Boot became a lecturer in English and American literature and was also an art and film critic.

Boot is the father of the MSNBC and CNN contributor Max Boot, who was born in Moscow in 1969. Boot and his wife divorced in 1971. A dissident who was active in samizdat, he left the Soviet Union in 1973, fleeing from the unwanted attentions of the KGB, and in 1976 his former wife also emigrated with their son, settling in California. In 1975, Boot renounced his Soviet citizenship.

== Career outside Russia ==
In 1973, Boot settled in the United States, where he worked in advertising. He later pursued this career in the United Kingdom, after moving there in 1988. In England he converted to high church Anglicanism with the help of Peter Mullen, whose services he began to attend regularly, and in 2015 to Catholicism.

Boot became an occasional journalist in the British news media, writing articles for the Daily Mail, the London Magazine, the Salisbury Review and The Independent, while continuing with his main career in business. However, in 2005 he retired as a company director and took to writing full-time, encouraged to write books by his friend Dr Anthony Daniels.

Boot's first book was How the West Was Lost (2006), in which his principal theme was that the West he had fled Russia to find was disappearing. It had been confident, with a cultural excellence and creativity in art, architecture, and music, which was fundamentally spiritual. Where once there had been such a civilization, together with commitment to religion, there was now only an animalistic pursuit of "happiness" by people numbed by drugs and pop music, living self-indulgently and believing in nothing. The great institutions that had once defended political liberties had given way to the cult of the individual, philistinism, and nihilism.

In 2008, Boot's essay "Political Correctness" was published in The Nation That Forgot God, a collection of essays edited by Edward Leigh, with work by Roger Scruton, Vincent Nichols, Shusha Guppy, Aidan Bellenger, and Michael Nazir-Ali. The Catholic Times noted that "The nation of the title of this book of essays is, of course, Britain. The arresting title is justified by the intellectual strength of the twelve authors." Later in 2008 Boot's "Life in Putin's Russia" was published in The Chesterton Review.

In 2009, Boot released God and Man According to Tolstoy, in which he deals with the philosophical and moral views of Leo Tolstoy, as seen in his non-fiction.

In 2011, Boot launched his own blog, alexanderboot.com.

His The Crisis Behind Our Crisis (2011) deals with the moral aspects of the Euro area crisis which followed the 2008 financial crisis and has a foreword by Theodore Dalrymple, who says in it that Boot has implacable logic and grasp of history. Reviewing the work for The American Conservative, Paul Gottfried comments that "Boot explores the metaphysical and moral origins of what are usually viewed as strictly financial questions" and notes that it is "mostly about history, philosophy, and the Christian convictions of the author."

Of How the Future Worked (2013), a memoir of Boot's years in Soviet Russia, Owen Matthews has said that the book makes sweeping generalizations and is "exuberant and chaotic, colourful, erratic… not unlike Russia itself."

Boot is married to the pianist Penelope Blackie and spends much of his time at their house in rural France.

== Positions ==
A monarchist, and an admirer of the British constitution, Boot finds the Whig Edmund Burke its most brilliant political mind. Identifying with traditional conservatism, he has written of Ayn Rand that she "fuses the values of cutthroat capitalism with fascist philosophy and aesthetics… Just like Marx, Rand creates an imaginary economic world that has little to do with reality."

Boot has called liberal democracy "nothing but a mendacious slogan of a virtual world", as it is "neither truly democratic nor particularly liberal", resting on the ever-growing power over people of a centralized state which has dictatorial power. He makes no attempt to defend "real democracy", which in his view leads inevitably to centralization and bureaucratic control, and instead proposes that the right to vote should be limited, with no electoral franchise for those who get more than half of their earned income from the government.

Boot believes the state should be smaller, and people should be self-sufficient. He has also proposed that a return to the gold standard would restore monetary rectitude.

Boot defends the Roman Catholicism of the Middle Ages and is critical of other forms of Christianity, especially the Protestant Reformation led by Martin Luther and John Calvin. He stresses Luther's antisemitism, finding a direct link between Luther and the Holocaust, and considers that Protestants have pushed the West towards excessive materialism. He is also critical of the Eastern Orthodox Church. Boot considers that the East–West Schism of 1054, resulting from the filioque disagreement on whether the Holy Spirit proceeds from the Son as well as the Father, led to a similar split in attitudes to work, undermining the power of religion and allowing people to pursue happiness regardless of Christian morality.

In April 2012, The Independent quoted Boot as claiming that the UK Independence Party was "the only party that reflects the consensus of our population" on Europe.

Also in 2012, Pink News called on its readers to complain about what they called a "startlingly homophobic" article by Boot in The Daily Mail.

== Selected publications ==
- How the West Was Lost (I. B. Tauris, 2006, ISBN 978-1784534608
- "Life in Putin's Russia" in The Chesterton Review 34 (2008), 298–305
- "Political Correctness" in Michael Nazir-Ali, Edward Leigh, Roger Scruton, A Nation That Forgot God (London: Social Affairs Unit, 2008, ISBN 978-1904863410)
- God and Man According to Tolstoy (Palgrave Macmillan, 2009 ISBN 978-0230615861)
- The Crisis Behind Our Crisis (St Matthew Publishing, 2011, ISBN 978-1901546385)
- How the Future Worked: Russia Through the Eyes of a Young Non-Person (Roper Penberthy Publishing, 2013 ISBN 978-1903905821)
- Democracy as a Neocon Trick (Roper Penberthy Publishing, 2014, ISBN 9781903905852)
