= Sue Mi Terry =

Korean-American international relations scholar and former CIA analyst

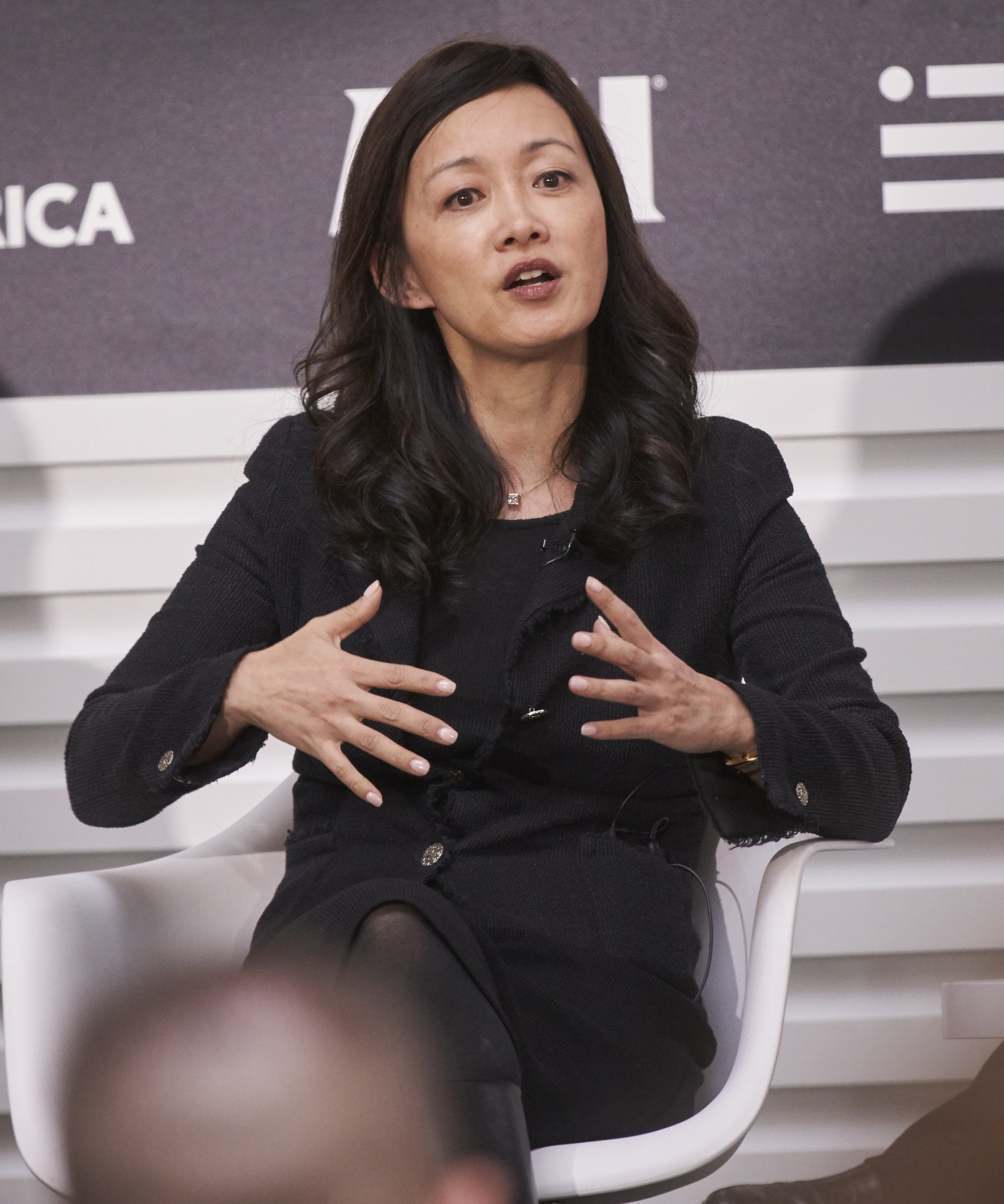
- Sue Mi Terry speaking at a conference in 2018
- Born: 1971 or 1972 (age 53–54); Seoul, South Korea
- Education: New York University (BA); Tufts University (PhD)
- Occupation: International relations scholar
- Employer: Council on Foreign Relations
- Title: Senior Fellow for Korea Studies
- Spouse: Max Boot

Korean name
- Hangul: 김수미
- RR: Gim Sumi
- MR: Kim Sumi

Sue Mi Terry (born c. 1972) is a Korean-American scholar of international relations who previously held the position of senior fellow at the Council on Foreign Relations and served as a CIA intelligence analyst specializing in East Asia.

On July 16, 2024, Terry was arrested on charges of acting as an unregistered agent for the National Intelligence Service of South Korea. Allegedly, Terry used her roles at think tanks to secretly advance South Korean interests, including disclosing nonpublic U.S. government information and influencing policy. In return, she reportedly received luxury goods, expensive meals, and funding for her public policy program.

The indictment has been criticized by leading civil liberties groups as a threat to the First Amendment.

== Early life and education ==
Terry was born in Seoul. After her father's death from liver cancer when she was in the fourth grade, she moved with her mother to the United States at age 12. She was raised in Hawaii and Virginia.

Terry received a B.A. in political science from New York University in 1993. In 2001, she earned a Ph.D. in international relations from the Fletcher School of Law and Diplomacy at Tufts University.

== Career ==
She worked at the Central Intelligence Agency, the National Security Council (NSC), the National Intelligence Council and the Weatherhead East Asian Institute at Columbia University. From 2001 to 2008, Terry was a senior analyst on Korean issues for the CIA, where she produced hundreds of intelligence assessments. Terry subsequently admitted that she resigned from the CIA to avoid being fired over what she described as the agency's "problems" concerning her contacts with South Korean intelligence.

From 2008 to 2009, Terry was director of Korea, Japan, and oceanic affairs at the NSC under Presidents George W. Bush and Barack Obama. In that capacity, she formulated, coordinated, and implemented U.S. government policy toward Korea and Japan as well as Australia, New Zealand, and Oceania. She was a National Intelligence Fellow in the Council on Foreign Relations' David Rockefeller Studies Program from 2010 to 2011. Subsequently she served as a Senior Research Fellow at Columbia University's Weatherhead East Asian Institute from 2011 to 2015 and a Senior Advisor for Korea at Bower Group Asia from 2015 to 2017. Terry has received numerous awards for her leadership and mission support, including the 2008 CIA Foreign Language Award.

In 2017 she became a senior fellow for the Korea Chair at the Center for Strategic and International Studies.

In 2021, she was named director of the Hyundai Motor-Korea Foundation Center for Korean History and Public Policy at the Wilson Center, succeeding Jean H. Lee.

Terry has been cited as an expert on topics involving the Korean Peninsula, such as the likelihood of North Korean defections during and after the Olympics, whether US election results will affect relations with North Korea, the probabilities for success of summit meetings between state leaders in the US and North Korea, the impact of postponing or canceling joint military exercises, the effects of United Nations actions regarding human rights in North Korea and whether North Korea will attack South Korea.

== Indictment ==
On July 16, 2024, Terry was indicted and arrested for allegedly acting as an unregistered foreign agent of the South Korean government, in violation of the Foreign Agents Registration Act (FARA). According to the indictment, Terry began acting as an unregistered agent in 2013 and advocated for South Korean policy positions, disclosing nonpublic U.S. government information to South Korean intelligence officers, including providing to a handler in 2022 certain handwritten notes from a private meeting with U.S. Secretary of State Antony Blinken. In exchange, she allegedly received designer goods, upscale dinners, and over $37,000 in funding for policy programs she managed at think tanks via covert payments. Terry coauthored an opinion piece for The Washington Post with her husband, Max Boot, a columnist for the paper, in 2023. Boot has not been charged with any wrongdoing. According to prosecutors, the article was written at the behest of South Korean officials and used information they provided without disclosing the involvement of the officials.

Her lawyer, Lee Wolosky, rejected the U.S. government's allegations, saying that Terry upheld views as a scholar and news analyst even when it would clash with Seoul's perspective. Following suspension, Terry resigned from her role at the Council on Foreign Relations.

The indictment has been criticized by former White House Counsel Gregory B. Craig, attorney Philip Rottner, Washington Post columnist Jennifer Rubin, and Harvard Law School Professor Laurence Tribe. In Just Security, Craig wrote: "The Justice Department’s case against Dr. Terry is shockingly weak. If not completely wrong-headed to try to criminalize the conduct at issue (which I argue it is), the DOJ’s action is at best an overly aggressive enforcement action that is in no way worth the chilling effect it can have on scholars across this space.

Terry's attorneys have filed a motion asking the court to dismiss the charges on the grounds that the government has not presented any evidence that Terry willfully violated FARA. In early March, three leading civil liberties organizations - the ACLU, the Knight First Amendment Institute at Columbia University, and the Reporters Committee on Freedom of the Press - filed "amicus" (friend of the court) briefs supporting the motion from Terry's attorneys to dismiss the case. The Reporters Committee warned that the government's use of FARA to indict Terry "poses a unique and acute threat to press freedom". The ACLU/Knight Institute brief argues that "interpreting FARA broadly (...) raises serious First Amendment concerns."

In October 2026, the DOJ agreed to suspend prosecution of the case for a year, and subsequently drop the charges if Terry avoided legal trouble. As part of the deal, Terry signed an "agreed statement of facts", acknowledging some sponsorship by and communication with South Korean officials, but no unlawful wrongdoing.

Wolosky told the Washington Post that Terry was "pleased" with the decision.

== Other works ==
=== Documentary ===
Terry was a co-producer of Beyond Utopia, an Emmy-nominated documentary that largely centers around Pastor Seungeun Kim, a South Korean human rights activist and director of the Caleb Mission, which has rescued over 1,000 North Korean defectors since 2000.

=== Articles ===
- This nascent trilateral relationship is the best possible answer to China, The Washington Post, May 27, 2024 (co-authored with Max Boot)
- The Coming North Korean Crisis, Foreign Affairs, May 16, 2024
- The Dangers of Overreacting to North Korea’s Provocations, Foreign Affairs, January 30, 2024
- The New North Korean Threat, Foreign Affairs, January 19, 2023
