= History Upside Down =

2007 book by David Meir-Levi

History Upside Down: The Roots of Palestinian Fascism and the Myth of Israeli Aggression
- Author: David Meir-Levi
- Language: English
- Publisher: Encounter Books
- Publication date: December 20, 2007
- Publication place: United States
- Media type: Print (Hardcover)
- Pages: 152 pages
- ISBN: 1-59403-192-4

History Upside Down: The Roots of Palestinian Fascism and the Myth of Israeli Aggression, is a book by David Meir-Levi, professor of archaeology, Near Eastern history, and Middle Eastern history at San Jose State University about the Israel-Palestine conflict. Meir-Levi argues that Israel and Zionism have become the targets of antisemitic historical negationism by Arabic and Muslim bigots.

== Content ==
History Upside Down is divided into two sections. The first provides a history of the Arab-Israeli conflict and contemporary Middle Eastern antisemitism, including the collaboration of Amin al-Husseini and the Muslim Brotherhood with Nazi Germany, the post-war rise of antisemitic jihadists like Sayyid Qutb, and the establishment of Hamas. Meir-Levi examines the influence of unifying identities such as Islamic extremism and pan-Arabism as antisemitic motivators, as well as international relationships to the Axis powers and Soviet Union. Meir-Levi argues that Soviet Union propaganda transformed the image of Israel from an underdog into a perceived colonial oppressor.

The second half of the book is dedicated to "dissect[ing] the myths [Palestinian fascism] has created to justify this long aggression." These chapters address and reject the common understanding of events relating to Israeli settlement, the Nakba, and the Deir Yassin massacre.

== Reception ==
The work had a mixed reception. Political commentator and Middle East historian Asaf Romirowsky wrote in the Middle East Quarterly journal that History Upside Down "provides a valuable guide for those who wish to understand one important aspect of the Arab-Israeli conflict—the battle over the conflict's historical narrative," and that "Meir-Levi's book attempts to unearth the historical root problems of defending Israel; he shows how doing so has become increasingly difficult as a result of the intellectualization of the debate."

Writing for the Association for the Study of the Middle East and Africa, George L. Simpson, professor of history at High Point University, offered a mixed review of the book. Simpson contends that Meir Levi's argument is persuasive that the Arab-Israeli conflict is an existential conflict not constrained to modern political definitions. However, Simpson argues that Meir-Levi could have used more scholarly sourcing and painted the topic with more nuance.

In a 2008 review by Book News, which summarizes scholarly works, the book is outlined as "presenting a highly selective portrait of the history of Palestinian nationalism that highlights any connections to Nazism, Communism, and/or Islamism" and in an effort to deflect criticism of Israel and blame the Israeli-Palestinian conflict on "irrational Palestinian anti-Semitism", while "denying any genuine Palestinian political, social, and economic grievances".

According to Richard Kemp, Meir-Levi argues that propaganda of the Soviet Union transformed the image of Israel from an underdog into a perceived colonial oppressor. Further, Meir-Levi claims that the Palestinian movement is the "only national movement for political self-determination in the entire world, and across all of world history, to have as its goal the destruction of a sovereign state and the genocide of a people".
