= Jeff Jacoby (columnist) =

American journalist (born 1959)

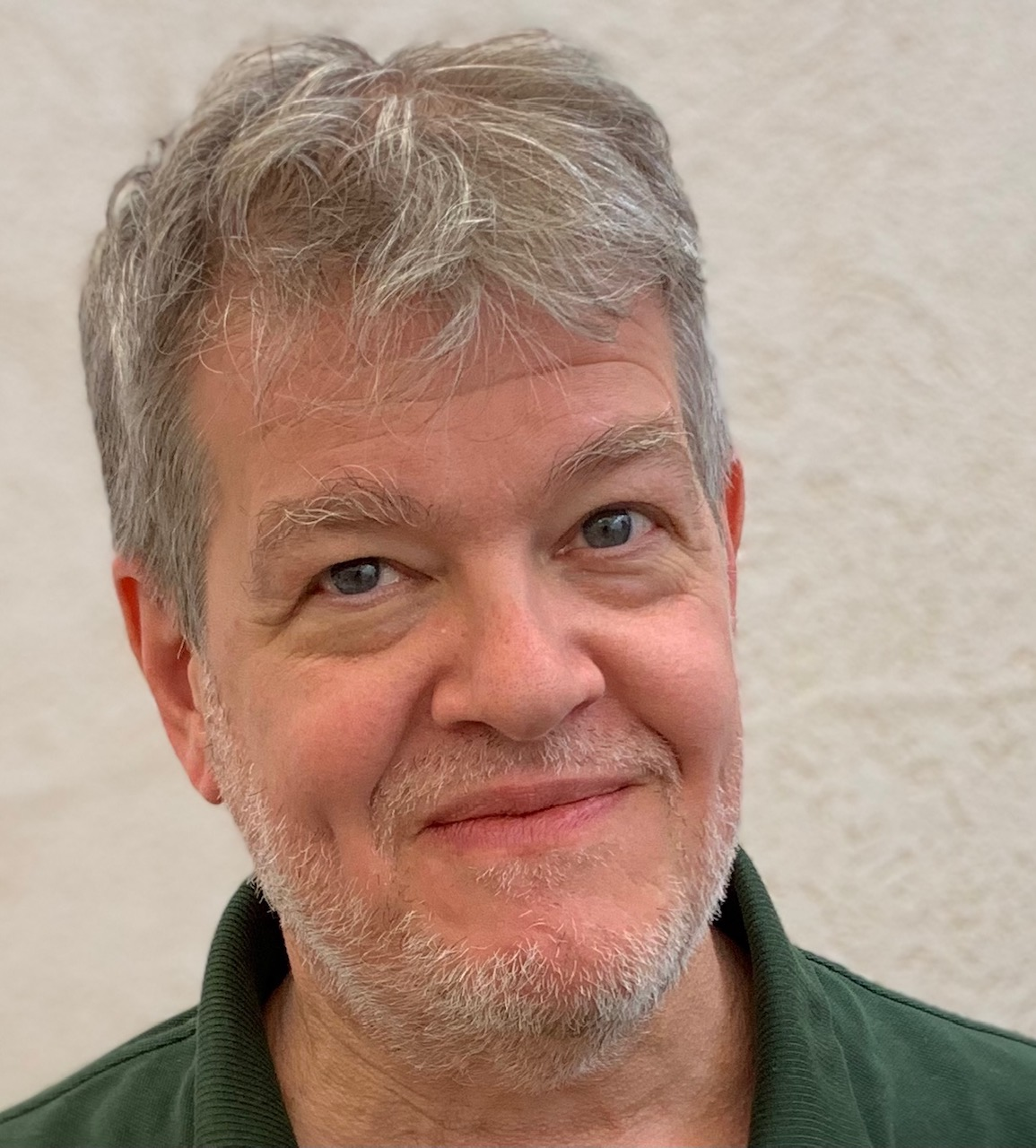
- Jacoby in 2021
- Born: February 10, 1959 (age 67); Cleveland, Ohio, U.S.
- Education: George Washington University (B.A.); Boston University School of Law (J.D.)
- Occupation: Journalist
- Employer: The Boston Globe
- Known for: Op-ed column

Jeffrey Jacoby (born February 10, 1959) is an American conservative journalist and syndicated newspaper columnist.

== Early life and education ==
Born in Cleveland, Ohio, United States, to a Jewish family, Jacoby received a B.A. degree with honors from The George Washington University and a J.D. degree from the Boston University School of Law. His father, a Holocaust survivor, was born in present-day Slovakia in 1925 and came to the United States in 1948.

== Career ==
Before becoming a columnist, Jacoby worked briefly as an attorney with the firm BakerHostetler and as deputy manager of Raymond Shamie's senatorial campaign in 1984. Following Shamie's loss, Jacoby worked for 15 months as an assistant to John Silber, then-president of Boston University. Jacoby is a member of the Ford Hall Forum board, the nation's oldest free public lecture series.

=== Journalism ===
Jacoby's column has been published on the op-ed page of The Boston Globe since 1994. From 1987 to 1994, he was chief editorial writer for the Boston Herald. Within months of his debut at the Globe, he was described by the left-leaning Boston Phoenix as "the region's pre-eminent spokesman for the Conservative Nation," and a columnist who had "quickly established himself as a must-read." Jacoby has also been a commentator on the local NPR affiliate, WBUR, and for several years hosted a talk show on local television. He is also a public speaker who lectures nationwide.

In 1997, Jacoby published "A message to my newborn son". The article became the first in an annual tradition, publishing "Letters to Caleb" until 2009.

==== 2000 suspension ====
In 2000, Jacoby was suspended by the Globe for four months without pay for what the paper called his "serious journalistic misconduct" in failing to provide sources for a Fourth of July column on the fate of the signers of the Declaration of Independence. Although the themes and ideas in the column had already appeared in other media outlets, Jacoby should have mentioned that the column's content needed to be more original. The Globe "avoided calling the column a work of plagiarism but stated that Jacoby should have alerted readers to similar accounts published elsewhere over the years." On CNN's Reliable Sources, veteran journalists Bernard Kalb and Howard Kurtz concluded that "Jeff Jacoby got shafted by the Boston Globe." Time magazine's Lance Morrow wrote that "Jacoby's offense was no offense." Many conservative organizations and commentators expressed outrage, saying that Jacoby had been unfairly held to a far stricter standard than other journalists would be. The Boston Phoenix, often at odds with Jacoby's views, also rose to Jacoby's defense.

Jacoby acknowledged having "made a mistake" in not including a disclaimer that the material in the column had been recycled but called the critical reaction of the Globe ombudsman, Jack Thomas, "disgraceful and nonsensical." He told Fox News' Bill O'Reilly that he had received an offer from another media outlet. The suspension came two years after the forced resignations of Globe columnists Mike Barnicle and Patricia Smith, who were caught fabricating stories and quotes. Boston University professor Tobe Berkovitz hypothesized that the scandals surrounding those two columnists had influenced the Globe's decision to suspend Jacoby. "Considering the recent track record with problems with columnists at the Globe, I'm not surprised with the action they took," Berkovitz said.

Jacoby claimed that as the only conservative columnist on the otherwise liberal Globe op-ed pages, he was held to a higher standard. "I've been aware from the outset that I have to be extremely aware of my column," he told the Associated Press. In August 2000, Jacoby filed a grievance through his union, The Newspaper Guild.

=== Awards and honors ===
In 1999, Jacoby became the first recipient of the Breindel Prize, a $10,000 award (since increased to $20,000) for excellence in opinion journalism awarded by Rupert Murdoch's News Corporation. In 2004, he received the Thomas Paine Award from the libertarian law firm the Institute for Justice, an award presented to journalists "who dedicate their work to the preservation and championing of individual liberty." In December 2009, he was presented by the Zionist Organization of America with its Ben Hecht Award for Outstanding Journalism on the Middle East, an award previously won by, among others, the Jerusalem Post's Caroline Glick, syndicated columnist Cal Thomas, the late A.M. Rosenthal of The New York Times, and Daniel Pipes, founder of the Middle East Forum and publisher of Middle East Quarterly.

== Personal life ==
Jacoby and his wife, Laura Weller, have two sons, Caleb (born 1997) and Micah (born 2003); Micah was born in Guatemala and adopted by the Jacoby family in 2004. They live in Brookline Village, Brookline, Massachusetts. On January 6, 2014, Caleb, a student at the Maimonides School, was reported missing. Three days later, he was found safe in Times Square in New York City. Brookline police later announced that Caleb had run away from home of his own volition. Jacoby wrote a column about the community's response in The Boston Globe.
