= Iran: Religion, Politics and Society =

Iran: religion, politics, and society
- Author: Nikki R. Keddie
- Subject: History of religion, politics and society of Iran
- Publisher: Frank Cass Publishers (1980); Routledge (1983)
- Publication date: 1980; 1983
- Publication place: United Kingdom
- Pages: 248
- ISBN: 978-0-7146-4031-0

Iran: Religion, Politics, and Society is a book by Nikki R. Keddie which is about religion, politics and society in Iran. Frank Cass Publishers and Routledge published the book in 1980 and 1983, respectively.

== Parts ==
Part 1 covers religion and politics: religion and irreligion in early Iranian nationalism; the origins of the religious-radical alliance in Iran; popular participation in the Persian revolution of 1905 to 1911; and religion and society in Iran.

Part 2 covers socio-economic change: the economic history of Iran 1800 to 1914 and its political impact; Iran 1797 to 1941; stratification, social control and capitalism in Iranian villages - before and after land reform; oil, economic policy and social change in Iran.

== Editions ==
- Frank Cass Publishers (1980)
- Routledge (1983)
