= The Dream Palace of the Arabs =

1998 book by Fouad Ajami

The Dream Palace of the Arabs: A Generation's Odyssey
- Author: Fouad Ajami
- Subject: Lebanon
- Genre: History
- Publisher: Vintage Books
- Publication date: 1998
- ISBN: 978-0-375-70474-1

The Dream Palace of the Arabs: A Generation's Odyssey is a 1998 book written by Middle Eastern scholar Fouad Ajami.

== Content ==
Ajami first describes the history of Lebanon from 1920-1982 through the story of poet Khalil Hawi, who committed suicide following the 1982 Lebanon War.

The second chapter follows the careers of the Syrian poets Nizar Qabbani and Adunis, focusing on the socio-political developments in Syria that mirror the lives of Qabbani and Adonis.

Chapter three follows the rise of Saddam Hussein's Iraq and the war with Iran during the 1980s, and the invasion of Kuwait in 1990.

Chapter four, "In the land of Egypt", focuses on socio-political life in Egypt post Sadat. In particular, Ajami follows the at-risk secularists in Egyptian society, such as Naguib Mahfouz, who was almost killed in 1994 by an Islamist assassin.

The last chapter, "An Orphaned Peace", focuses on the peace process in the Israeli–Palestinian conflict. In particular, Ajami focuses on the response of Arab intellectuals and their united opposition to the peace process.

Published by Vintage Books 1999. ISBN 978-0-375-70474-1.
