= Jay Nordlinger =

American journalist

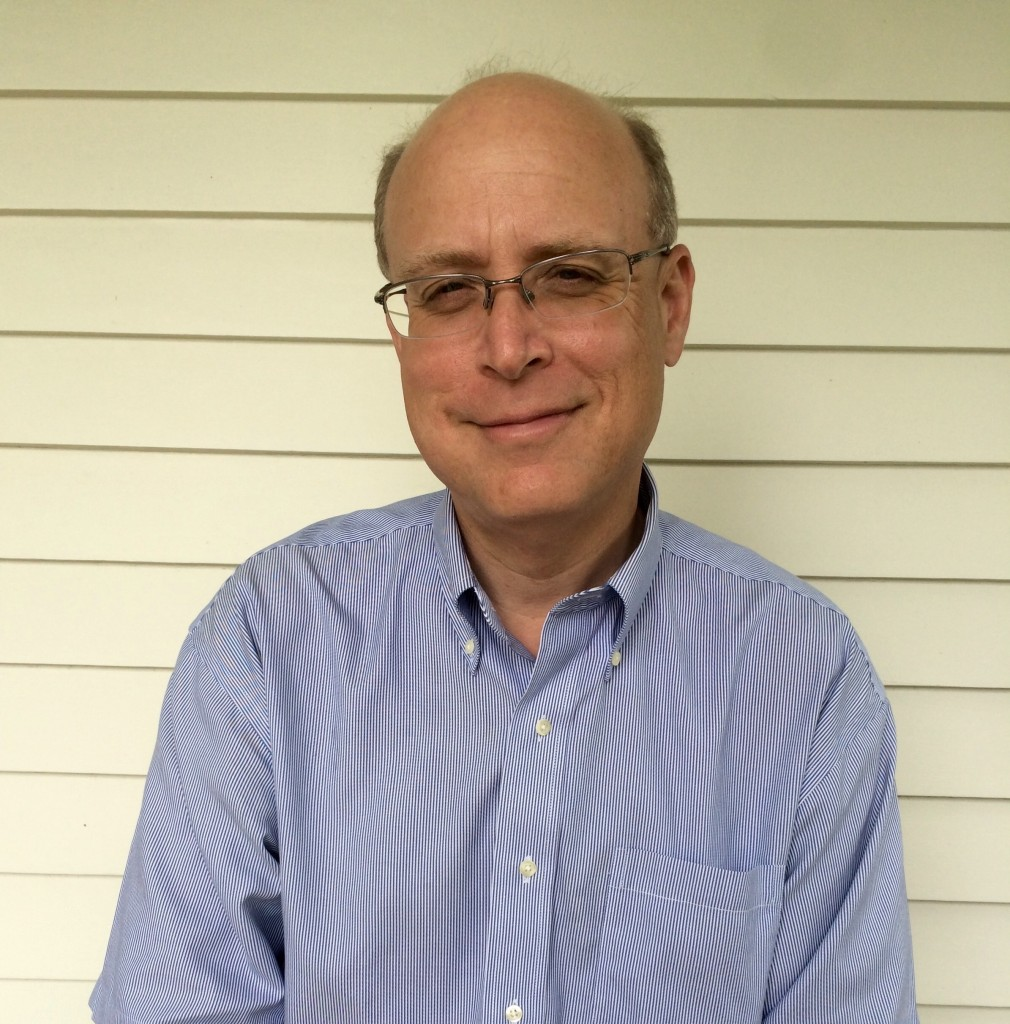
- Nordlinger in 2015
- Born: Jay Stephen Nordlinger; November 21, 1963 (age 62); Ann Arbor, Michigan, U.S.
- Education: University of Michigan (BA)
- Political party: Republican (before 2016); Independent (2016–present)
- Awards: Eric Breindel Award

Jay Stephen Nordlinger (born November 21, 1963) is an American conservative commentator. He is a former senior editor of National Review, and a book fellow of the National Review Institute. He is also a music critic for The New Criterion and The Conservative.

In the 1990s, Nordlinger worked for The Weekly Standard magazine. In the 2000s, he was music critic for the New York Sun.

== Early life ==
Nordlinger grew up in Ann Arbor, Michigan, which he has called a "Citadel of the Left". His father worked in the education sector and his mother was an artist. He graduated from the University of Michigan.

== Career ==
Since 2002, he has hosted a series of public interviews at the Salzburg Festival. With Mona Charen, he hosted the Need to Know podcast, and he also hosts a podcast called "Q&A." In 2011, he filmed The Human Parade, with Jay Nordlinger, a TV series of hour-long interviews with personalities.

In 2007, National Review Books published Here, There & Everywhere: Collected Writings of Jay Nordlinger, comprising 100 pieces on various subjects. In 2012, Encounter Books published Peace, They Say: A History of the Nobel Peace Prize, the Most Famous and Controversial Prize in the World. In 2015, Encounter Books published Children of Monsters: An Inquiry into the Sons and Daughters of Dictators. In 2016, National Review Books published a second anthology of Nordlinger's essays and articles, Digging In: Further Collected Writings of Jay Nordlinger. He left National Review in May 2025.

== Awards ==
In 2001, Nordlinger received the Eric Breindel Award for Excellence in Opinion Journalism, a now defunct annual award given by News Corporation, in honor of the late editorial-page editor of the New York Post. It was to be awarded to a journalist whose writing demonstrated "love of country and its democratic institutions" and "bears witness to the evils of totalitarianism."

== Personal life ==
Nordlinger is a fan of the Detroit Pistons, and lives in New York City.
