= Farhat Jacob Ziadeh =

Palestinian scholar of Islamic law

Farhat Jacob Ziadeh (April 8, 1917 – June 8, 2016) was a Palestinian scholar of Islamic law, a lawyer, and an expert in Arabic grammar who played a major role in the development of Middle East studies in the United States.

== Biography ==
Ziadeh was born in Ramallah, Palestine on April 8, 1917. He earned his B.A. from the American University of Beirut in 1937 and his LL.B. from the University of London in 1940. Due to his inability to return to Palestine during World War II, he emigrated to the United States and started working as an Arabic instructor in the Army Specialized Training Program at Princeton University under Philip K. Hitti. He moved back to London in 1946 to enroll at Lincoln's Inn Law School and earn his barrister at law degree. The next year, the Palestine Mandate administration nominated him to the office of magistrate in Safad, Palestine, which he retained until the end of the mandate in 1948. In 1949, he made his way back to Princeton University, where he was given a tenure-track professorship.

Ziadeh was invited to the University of Washington in 1966 to help launch a new program in Near Eastern studies. Within four years of his arrival at the University of Washington, Ziadeh expanded the Near Eastern studies program, created a new department called the Department of Near Eastern Languages and Literature in 1970, and served as its inaugural departmental chair. Although Ziadeh retired from the University of Washington in 1987, he continued to work in the discipline of Middle Eastern studies. He was given the MESA Mentoring Award in 1997 "in recognition of his exceptional contributions to the education and training of others in Middle East studies,". He was chosen as an honorary fellow of MESA in 2012. Ziadeh died on June 8, 2016.

== Works ==
- History of the American People, in Arabic (with Ibrahim Furayji, 1946)
- An Introduction to Modern Arabic (with R. B. Winder, 1958)
- A Reader in Modern Literary Arabic (1964)
- Lawyers: The Rule of Law and Liberalism in Modern Egypt (1968)
- Property Law in the Arab World (1979)
