= Eric Breindel Award for Excellence in Opinion Journalism =

The Eric Breindel Award for Excellence in Opinion Journalism, also known as the Eric Breindel Journalism Award, was an annual award commemorating Eric Breindel, a former editorial page editor of the New York Post, which existed from 1999 through 2012. It was given to "the columnist, editorialist or reporter who best reflects the spirit of Mr. Breindel's writings: Love of Country and its democratic institutions as well as the act of bearing witness to the evils of totalitarianism."

The award was instituted in 1999 with an endowment from Rupert Murdoch's News Corporation, and was administered by the Eric Breindel Memorial Foundation. From 2006 onwards, winners received $20,000; earlier winners received $10,000.

A second award, the Eric Breindel Collegiate Journalism Award, was given annually from 2006. As of 2009, it offered $10,000 plus a paid internship at Fox News Channel, The Wall Street Journal, or the New York Post.

The awards used to be announced in June every year.

The last awards were made in 2012; no further awards have been made since. The Eric Breindel Memorial Foundation has not filed a Form 990 with the IRS since 2014.

== Eric Breindel Journalism Award winners ==
| 2012 | Andrew Ferguson |
| 2011 | Fouad Ajami |
| 2010 | Mona Charen |
| 2009 | Charles Krauthammer |
| 2008 | Bret Stephens of The Wall Street Journal |
| 2007 | Max Boot |
| 2006 | Mark Steyn |
| 2005 | Claudia Rosett |
| 2004 | Daniel Henninger |
| 2003 | Michael Kelly |
| 2002 | Victor Davis Hanson |
| 2001 | Jay Nordlinger |
| 2000 | Tom Flannery, then a columnist at The Carbondale News |
| 1999 | Jeff Jacoby |

== Eric Breindel Collegiate Journalism Award winners ==
| 2012 | Angela Hunt, University of North Carolina, Wilmington |
| 2011 | Charles C. Johnson, Claremont McKenna College |
| 2010 | John-Clark Levin, Claremont McKenna College |
| 2009 | Carl Kelm, Stanford University |
| 2008 | Elise Viebeck Claremont McKenna College |
| 2007 | John Wilson, Claremont McKenna College |
| 2006 | Matt Mireles, Columbia University |
