= Khalid Duran =

Middle East-American sociologist and historian (1939–2010)

Khalid Durán (Arabic: خالد دوران) (4 April 1939 – 17 April 2010) was a specialist in the history, sociology, and politics of the Islamic world. He studied Middle Eastern languages and Islam in Bosnia and Morocco, and sociology and political science at the universities of Bonn and Berlin.

In the 1970s, he worked at Pakistan's Islamic Research Institute and traveled extensively in the Middle East and South Asia. He was a visiting professor at universities in Pakistan, Austria, Germany, Scandinavia, and the United States, teaching at departments of anthropology, history, religion, and sociology. He is the author of five books and numerous articles on Islam, the Middle East, North Africa, and Central and South Asia, covering both history and current affairs.

== Career ==
Durán was trained in Middle Eastern languages and Islamic studies in Morocco, Bosnia, and Pakistan. From 1961 to 1968, he studied political science and sociology at the Universities of Bonn and Berlin.

Durán was a senior fellow and researcher with the German Institute for Middle East Studies (Deutsches Orient-Institut) in Hamburg from 1978 to 1986. In 1984–1985, he also worked with the Tokyo-based United Nations University.

After 1986, Durán was a visiting professor of Middle East Studies at a number of universities in the United States, including Temple University in Philadelphia, American University in Washington, D.C., the University of California, Irvine in Irvine, California, and the University of Louisville in Louisville, Kentucky.

Durán was the editor of TransIslam Magazine, a quarterly journal analyzing Islam-related political and sociological developments. He was the president of the Ibn Khaldun Society.

For more than a decade, Khalid was employed as a human rights and country conditions consultant by Princeton, N.J. based Political Asylum Research and Documentation Service (PARDS), founded in 1990, and directed by Michael A. Pellerin. In this capacity Khalid contributed substantively and pivotally to the asylum claims of countless petitioners fleeing persecution, torture, and extrajudicial killings throughout the Islamic world.

Khalid was a childhood friend of Haris Silajdzic, Foreign Minister of Bosnia and Herzegovina. During a live June 13, 1993 C-Span debate with U.S. Army War College Professor, Colonel Harry Summers Jr., Michael A. Pellerin of Princeton, New Jersey based Political Asylum Research and Documentation Service, successfully convinced Summers to abandon his staunch opposition to lifting the U.S. arms embargo against the Government of Bosnia and Herzegovina. Summer's stunning reversal was memorialized the following day, June 14, 1993, on CNN's Larry King Live where he appeared as a guest, together with Silajdzic. Soon thereafter, Clinton ordered the arms embargo lifted, thus saving countless lives and hastening an end to the Yugoslav Genocide in Bosnia. It was a high honor to call Khalid both colleague and personal friend.

== Islamofascism ==
According to The Guardian's Albert Scardino, Duran coined the term "Islamofascism." Malise Ruthven, however, used the word in an article published in The Independent on 8 September 1990 (p. 15).
