= Dina Rizk Khoury =

American historian

Dina Rizk Khoury is a Lebanese-American historian, Guggenheim Fellow, Professor of History and International Affairs, at George Washington University and former President of the Middle East Studies Association of North America.

She graduated from the American University of Beirut with a B.A., from Georgetown University with a Ph.D. She is a lecturer for the MESA Lectureship Program. She spoke at Iraq Action Days.

== Awards ==
- 2007 Guggenheim Fellow

== Works ==
- "Iraq in Wartime: Soldiering, Martyrdom, and Remembrance", Cambridge University Press, 2013, ISBN 978-0-521-71153-1
- Postponed Lives: War and Remembrance in Iraq,
- "Violence and Spatial Politics between Local and Imperial: Baghdad, 1778-810," Spaces in the Modern City, Imaginaries, Politics and Everyday Life, editor Gyan Prakash, Kevin Kruse, Princeton University Press, 2008, ISBN 978-0-691-13343-0
- "Comparing Empires: The Ottoman Domains and the British Raj in the Long Nineteenth Century," co-authored with Dane Kennedy, Comparative Studies of South Asia, Africa and the Middle East 27, no. 2 (2007)
- "Who is a True Muslim? Exclusion and Inclusion among Polemicist of Reform in Baghdad," Early Modern Ottoman History: A Re-mapping the Empire, editor Virginia Aksan, Daniel Goffman Cambridge University Press, 2007, ISBN 978-0-521-81764-6
- State and Provincial Society in the Ottoman Empire, Cambridge University Press, 2002, ISBN 978-0-521-89430-2
- "Slippers at the Entrance or Behind Closed Doors: Domestic and Public Space for Mosuli Women", Women in the Early Modern Ottoman Empire, editor Madeline Zilfi, BRILL, 1997, ISBN 978-90-04-10804-2
- "The Introduction of Commercial Agriculture in the Province of Mosul and its Effects on the Peasantry 1750-1850", Landholding and commercial agriculture in the Middle East, Editors Çağlar Keyder, Faruk Tabak, SUNY Press, 1991, ISBN 978-0-7914-0550-5
- "The Ottoman centre versus provincial Power-holders: an analysis of historiography", The Cambridge history of Turkey: the later Ottoman Empire, 1603-1839, Editor Suraiya Faroqhi, Cambridge University Press, 2006, ISBN 978-0-521-62095-6
