= Max Boot =

Russian-American writer and historian (born 1969)

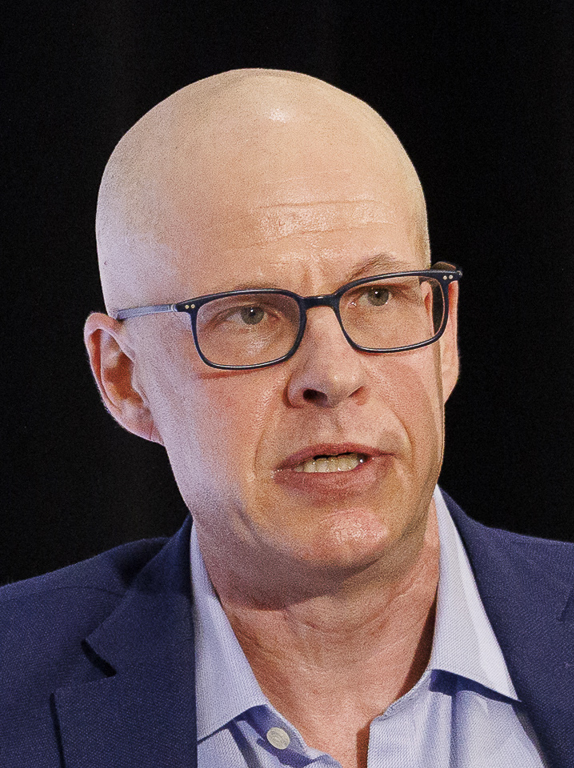
- Boot in 2024
- Born: September 12, 1969 (age 57); Moscow, Russian SFSR, Soviet Union
- Education: University of California, Berkeley (BA); Yale University (MA); London School of Economics
- Occupations: Writer, historian
- Spouse: Sue Mi Terry
- Relatives: Alexander Boot (father)
- Writing career
- Subject: Military history
- Website: maxboot.net

Max A. Boot (Russian: Макс Александрович Бут; born September 12, 1969) is a Russian-born naturalized American author, editorialist, lecturer, and military historian. He worked as a writer and editor for The Christian Science Monitor and then for The Wall Street Journal in the 1990s. Since then, he has been the Jeane J. Kirkpatrick Senior Fellow in National Security Studies at the Council on Foreign Relations and a contributor to The Washington Post. He has written for such publications as The Weekly Standard, the Los Angeles Times, and The New York Times, and he has authored books of military history. In 2018, Boot published The Road Not Taken, a biography of Edward Lansdale, which was a New York Times bestseller and a finalist for the Pulitzer Prize for biography, and The Corrosion of Conservatism: Why I Left the Right, which details Boot's "ideological journey from a 'movement' conservative to a man without a party", in the aftermath of the 2016 U.S. presidential election. His biography of Ronald Reagan, Reagan: His Life and Legend, was a New York Times Bestseller and named one of the New York Times' 10 Best Books of 2024, as well as one of the year's best books by The Washington Post and The New Yorker.

== Early and personal life ==
Boot was born in Moscow. His parents and grandmother, all Russian Jews, emigrated from the Soviet Union, his father in 1973 to New York, and he and his mother and grandmother in 1976 to Los Angeles, where he was raised and eventually gained naturalized U.S. citizenship. Boot attended the University of California, Berkeley where he graduated with honors with a Bachelor of Arts degree in history in 1991 and Yale University with an MA in Diplomatic History in 1992. He began his career in journalism writing columns for the Berkeley student newspaper The Daily Californian. He later said that he believes he is the only conservative writer in that paper's history. As of 2005, Boot and his family lived in the New York area.

Max Boot's spouse is Sue Mi Terry. On July 16, 2024, Terry was indicted and arrested for allegedly acting as an unregistered foreign agent of the South Korean government. Boot co-authored an opinion piece with Terry for the Washington Post in 2023. According to prosecutors, the article was written at the behest of South Korean officials and used information they provided without disclosing the involvement of the Korean government. Boot has not been accused of any wrongdoing. The indictment has been criticized by civil liberties groups as a threat to freedom of speech.

== Career ==
Boot has been the Jeane J. Kirkpatrick Senior Fellow in National Security Studies at the Council on Foreign Relations (CFR), a contributing editor to The Weekly Standard and the Los Angeles Times, and a regular contributor to other publications such as The Wall Street Journal, The Washington Post and The New York Times. He has blogged regularly for Commentary since 2007, and for several years on its blog page called Contentions. He has given lectures at U.S. military institutions such as the Army War College and the Command and General Staff College.

Boot worked as a writer and as an editor for The Christian Science Monitor from 1992 to 1994. He moved to The Wall Street Journal for the next eight years. After writing an investigative column about legal issues called "Rule of Law" for four years, he was promoted to editor of the op-ed page.

Boot left the Journal in 2002 to join the Council on Foreign Relations as a Senior Fellow in National Security Studies. His initial writings with the CFR appeared in several publications, including The New York Post, The Times, Financial Times, and International Herald Tribune.

External videos
- Booknotes interview with Boot on Out of Order, May 31, 1998, C-SPAN
- Presentation by Boot on The Savage Wars of Peace, April 25, 2002, C-SPAN
- Presentation by Boot on War Made New, November 14, 2006, C-SPAN
- Washington Journal interview with Boot on War Made New, December 20, 2006, C-SPAN
- Presentation by Boot on War Made New, April 29, 2007, C-SPAN
- Presentation by Boot on Invisible Armies, January 17, 2013, C-SPAN
- Presentation by Boot on The Road Not Taken, January 9, 2018, C-SPAN
- Washington Journal interview with Boot on The Corrosion of Conservatism, October 11, 2018, C-SPAN
- Presentation by Boot on The Corrosion of Conservatism, October 29, 2018, C-SPAN

Boot wrote Savage Wars of Peace, a study of small wars in American history, with Basic Books in 2002. The title came from Kipling's poem "White Man's Burden". James A. Russell in Journal of Cold War Studies criticized the book, saying that "Boot did none of the critical research, and thus the inferences he draws from his uncritical rendition of history are essentially meaningless." Benjamin Schwarz argued in The New York Times that Boot asked the U.S. military to do a "nearly impossible task", and he criticized the book as "unrevealing". Victor Davis Hanson in History News Network gave a positive review, saying that "Boot's well-written narrative is not only fascinating reading, but didactic as well". Robert M. Cassidy in Military Review labeled it "extraordinary". Boot's book also won the 2003 General Wallace M. Greene Jr. Award from the Marine Corps Heritage Foundation as the best non-fiction book recently published pertaining to Marine Corps history.

Boot wrote once again for the CFR in 2003 and 2004.

The World Affairs Councils of America named Boot one of "the 500 most influential people in the United States in the field of foreign policy" in 2004. He also worked as member of the Project for the New American Century (PNAC) in 2004.

Boot published the work War Made New, an analysis of revolutions in military technology since 1500, in 2006. The book's central thesis is that a military succeeds when it has the dynamic, forward-looking structures and administration in place to exploit new technologies. It concludes that the U.S. military may lose its edge if it does not become flatter, less bureaucratic, and more decentralized. The book received praise from Josiah Bunting III in The New York Times, who called it "unusual and magisterial", and criticism from Martin Sieff in The American Conservative, who called it "remarkably superficial".

Boot wrote many more articles with the CFR in 2007, and he received the Eric Breindel Award for Excellence in Opinion Journalism that year. In an April 2007 episode of Think Tank with Ben Wattenberg, Boot stated that he "used to be a journalist" and that he currently views himself purely as a military historian. Boot served as a foreign policy adviser to Senator John McCain in his 2008 United States presidential election bid. He stated in an editorial in World Affairs Journal that he saw strong parallels between Theodore Roosevelt and McCain. Boot continued to write for the CFR in several publications in 2008 and 2009.

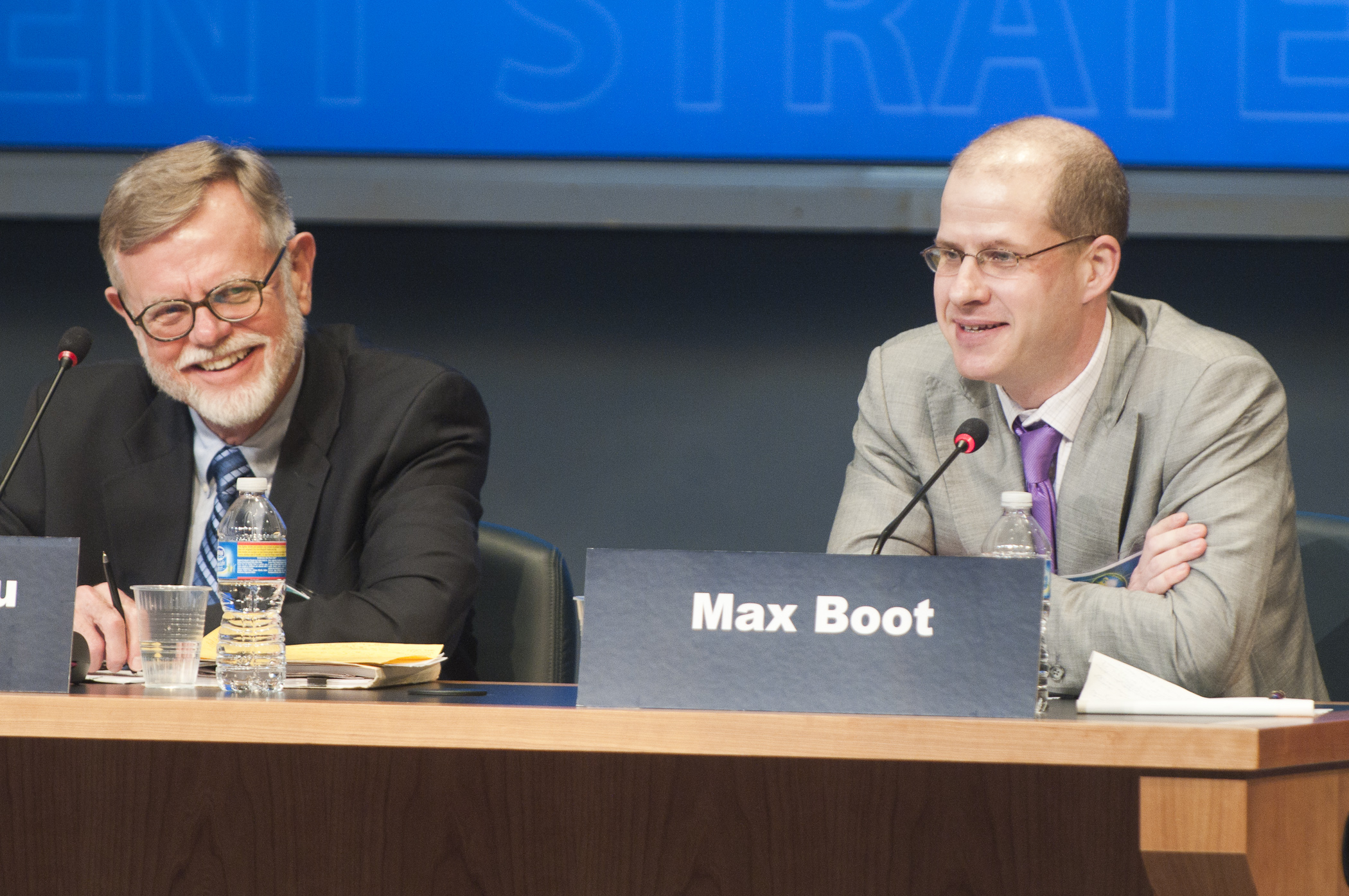
Max Boot (R) speaks at the second panel discussion at the 2010 Current Strategy Forum at the Naval War College.

Boot wrote for the CFR through 2010 and 2011 for publications such as Newsweek, The Boston Globe, The New York Times and The Weekly Standard. He particularly argued that President Barack Obama's healthcare plans made maintaining U.S. superpower status harder, that withdrawal of U.S. troops from Iraq occurred prematurely while making another war there more likely, and that the initial U.S. victory in Afghanistan had been undone by government complacency though forces could still pull off a victory. He also wrote op-eds criticizing planned budget austerity measures in both the U.S. and the U.K. as hurting their national security interests.

In September 2012, Boot co-wrote with Brookings Institution senior fellow Michael Doran a New York Times op-ed titled "5 Reasons to Intervene in Syria Now", advocating U.S. military force to create a countrywide no-fly zone reminiscent of NATO's role in the Kosovo War. He stated first and second that "American intervention would diminish Iran's influence in the Arab world" and that "a more muscular American policy could keep the conflict from spreading" with "sectarian strife in Lebanon and Iraq". Third, Boot argued that "training and equipping reliable partners within Syria's internal opposition" could help "create a bulwark against extremist groups like Al Qaeda". He concluded that "American leadership on Syria could improve relations with key allies like Turkey and Qatar" as well as "end a terrible human-rights disaster".

Another well received book by Boot, titled Invisible Armies (2013), is about the history of guerrilla warfare, analyzing various cases of successful and unsuccessful insurgent efforts such as the fighting during the American war of independence, the Vietnam War, and the current Syrian Civil War. He states that traditional, conventional army tactics as employed by the American military under the administrations of President Bush and President Obama against guerrilla organizations have produced strategic failures. Boot has discussed his book in various programs such as the Hoover Institution's Uncommon Knowledge series, appearing on it in January 2014.

== Political beliefs ==
Boot considers himself to be a "natural contrarian". He identifies as a conservative, once joking that "I grew up in the 1980s, when conservatism was cool". He is in favor of limited government at home and American leadership abroad, believing America should be "the world's policeman".

Boot was one of the earliest proponents of the US invasion and occupation of Iraq. In October 2001, in an article titled "The Case for American Empire", he proposed that the United States must greatly increase its military engagement against other countries and compared his proposal to invade Afghanistan and Iraq with the American role in defeating Nazi Germany. He wrote:

Once Afghanistan has been dealt with, America should turn its attention to Iraq ... Once we have deposed Saddam, we can impose an American-led, international regency in Baghdad, to go along with the one in Kabul ... It is a matter of self-defense: [Saddam] is currently working to acquire weapons of mass destruction that he or his confederates will unleash against America ... To turn Iraq into a beacon of hope for the oppressed peoples of the Middle East ... This could be the chance to right the scales, to establish the first Arab democracy, and to show the Arab people that America is committed to freedom for them.

Boot is a strong supporter of Israel and opposed the dismantling of Israeli settlements in the occupied West Bank. He wrote in 2008 that "the reason Israelis aren't dismantling the settlements (and that President Bush isn't pressing them to do so) has nothing to do with the views of American Jewish groups and everything to do with the dismal record of recent Israeli concessions in southern Lebanon and the Gaza Strip. In both cases (as well as at the Camp David negotiations in 2000) Israelis thought that territorial concessions would lead to peace. Instead they led to the empowerment of terrorists." In 2017 Boot supported President Trump's controversial decision to relocate the American embassy to Jerusalem: "he got this one right. My only complaint is that this move is more symbolic than substantive". He voiced support for Israel during the Gaza genocide. In January 2024, he criticized South Africa's ICJ genocide case against Israel.

In 2011, Boot supported the NATO-led military intervention in Libya.

In 2015 and 2016, Boot was a campaign advisor to Marco Rubio for the 2016 United States presidential primaries and strongly opposed Trump's 2016 presidential candidacy. Boot said in March 2016 that he would "sooner vote for Josef Stalin than he would vote for Donald Trump". In August 2016, after Trump won the presidential nomination, he became highly critical of the Republican Party and endorsed Democratic candidate Hillary Clinton in the 2016 U.S. presidential election. Boot was critical of the nomination of Rex Tillerson to the position of Secretary of State, believing him to be problematically pro-Russian, and subsequently called on Tillerson to resign.

In an opinion piece for Foreign Policy in September 2017, Boot outlined his political views as follows: "I am socially liberal: I am pro-LGBTQ rights, pro-abortion rights, pro-immigration. I am fiscally conservative: I think we need to reduce the deficit and get entitlement spending under control. I am pro-environment: I think that climate change is a major threat that we need to address. I am pro-free trade: I think we should be concluding new trade treaties rather than pulling out of old ones. I am strong on defense: I think we need to beef up our military to cope with multiple enemies. And I am very much in favor of America acting as a world leader: I believe it is in our own self-interest to promote and defend freedom and free markets as we have been doing in one form or another since at least 1898."

In December 2017, also in Foreign Policy, Boot wrote that recent events—particularly since the 2016 election of Donald Trump as president—had caused him to rethink some of his previous views concerning the existence of white privilege and male privilege. "In the last few years, in particular, it has become impossible for me to deny the reality of discrimination, harassment, even violence that people of color and women continue to experience in modern-day America from a power structure that remains for the most part in the hands of straight, white males. People like me, in other words. Whether I realize it or not, I have benefited from my skin color and my gender—and those of a different gender or sexuality or skin color have suffered because of it."

Boot is a member of the advisory board of Renew Democracy Initiative, a non-partisan organization founded in 2017.

In March 2019, Boot proposed to retire the neoconservative label, saying that the term "neocon thinking" is falsely associated with the advocacy of the United States invasion and occupation of Iraq:

The misuse of the "neocon" label reached an absurd extreme in a Post op-ed by Rep. Ro Khanna (D-Calif.), [who wrote:] "I have been consistent of talking about the neocon thinking that led to the Iraq blunder and what followed." That actually isn't much of an improvement, because Khanna is repeating the canard that neocons were responsible for the Iraq War.

Boot is a proponent of perpetual deployment:

We need to think of these deployments [in Afghanistan and Syria] in much the same way we thought of our Indian Wars, which lasted roughly 300 years (ca. 1600-1890), or as the British thought about their deployment on the North West Frontier (today's Pakistan-Afghanistan border), which lasted 100 years (1840s-1940s). U.S. troops are not undertaking a conventional combat assignment. They are policing the frontiers of the Pax Americana.

In 2018 he argued for the United States to help the Syrian Democratic Forces establish an 'autonomous zone' in Syria as "this would protect at least a portion of Syrian territory from Russian and Iranian domination and give the United States a strong say in that country's future.

Boot has suggested that if conservative television news channels—Fox News Channel, One America News and Newsmax—do not "stop propagating lies", "large cable companies such as Comcast and Charter Spectrum need to step in" and "boot" them off, dealing with them "just as we do with foreign terrorist groups".

Mark Ames of The Nation, Adam Johnson of Fairness and Accuracy in Reporting, Tucker Carlson and Glenn Greenwald have denounced Boot as a "warmonger".

Boot has argued in favor of increased content moderation of social media. When Elon Musk proposed to acquire Twitter, Boot said that he was "frightened by the impact on society and politics" and asserted that "[f]or democracy to survive, we need more content moderation, not less."

== Bibliography ==
- Reagan: His Life and Legend (Liveright Publishing Corporation/W.W. Norton & Company, Inc., 2024), ISBN 978-0-87140-944-7
- The Corrosion of Conservatism: Why I Left the Right. Description & arrow/scrollable preview. (Liveright Publishing Corporation/W. W. Norton & Company, Inc., 2018), ISBN 9-781-63149-5670
- The Road Not Taken: Edward Lansdale and the American Tragedy in Vietnam (Liveright Publishing Corporation/W. W. Norton & Company, Inc., 2018), ISBN 0-871-40941-0
- Invisible Armies: An Epic History of Guerrilla Warfare from Ancient Times to the Present (Liveright, 2013), ISBN 0-87140-424-9
- War Made New: Technology, Warfare, and the Course of History, 1500 to Today (Gotham Books, 2006), ISBN 1-59240-222-4
- The Savage Wars of Peace: Small Wars and the Rise of American Power (Basic Books, 2002), ISBN 0-465-00721-X
- Out of Order: Arrogance, Corruption and Incompetence on the Bench (Basic Books, 1998), ISBN 0-465-05375-0
