= Beyond Utopia =

2023 American documentary film

- Theatrical release poster
- Directed by: Madeleine Gavin
- Produced by: Jana Edelbaum; Rachel Cohen; Sue Mi Terry
- Cinematography: Kim Hyun-seok
- Edited by: Madeleine Gavin
- Music by: Adam Taylor; Taylor Page
- Production companies: Ideal Partners; 19340 Productions; XRM Media; Random Good Foundation; Two Chairs Films; Human Rights Foundation
- Distributed by: Roadside Attractions; Fathom Events
- Release dates: January 21, 2023 (Sundance); October 23, 2023 (United States)
- Running time: 107 minutes
- Country: United States
- Languages: English; Korean
- Box office: $52,859

Beyond Utopia is a 2023 American documentary film directed by Madeleine Gavin. Debuted at the 2023 Sundance Film Festival, the documentary largely centers around Pastor Seungeun Kim, a South Korean human rights activist and director of the Caleb Mission, which has rescued over 1,000 North Korean defectors since 2000. The film also shows amateur footage from inside the DPRK as well as interviews Hyeonseo Lee and other defectors, such as Lee So-yeon.

== Release ==
Beyond Utopia debuted at the Sundance Film Festival on January 21, 2023. The film was screened at the 28th Busan International Film Festival in the "Documentary Showcase" section on October 8, 2023. In the United States Roadside Attractions and Fathom Events acquired distribution rights and released the film on a two-day screening on October 23 and October 24, 2023. Independent Lens acquired broadcast television rights to the film, setting a January 9, 2024, broadcast.

== Reception ==
On the review aggregator website Rotten Tomatoes, 100% of 58 critics' reviews are positive. The website's consensus reads: "A documentary that feels like a thriller, Beyond Utopia is a gripping—and frightening—glimpse of life under oppression." Metacritic, which uses a weighted average, assigned the film a score of 85 out of 100, based on 16 critics, indicating "universal acclaim".

Writing for /Film, Ben Pearson gave the film a score of 9 out of 10 and found the handheld footage to be "nothing short of extraordinary." Variety's Owen Gleiberman praised the film for showing audiences the "forgotten" tragedy of North Korea through its use of impressive first-hand camerawork. In a more mixed review, Daniel Fienberg, writing for The Hollywood Reporter, found the film to have a tension-filled and emotional story while following the defecting families, but derided the inclusion of a "dry and lifeless" history lesson on North Korea that didn't fit alongside the compelling first-hand accounts.

=== Accolades ===
Award	Date of ceremony	Category	Recipient(s)	Result	Ref.
Sundance Film Festival	29 January 2023	U.S. Documentary Competition: Grand Jury Prize	Beyond Utopia	Nominated	
Sundance Film Festival	29 January 2023	U.S. Documentary Competition: Audience Award	Beyond Utopia	Won	
Sydney Film Festival	18 June 2023	GIO Audience Award for Best International Documentary	Beyond Utopia	Won	
Jerusalem Film Festival	23 July 2023	In Spirit for Freedom Award	Beyond Utopia	Nominated	
Asia Pacific Screen Awards	3 November 2023	Best Documentary Film	Beyond Utopia	Nominated	
Critics' Choice Documentary Awards	12 November 2023	Best Documentary Feature	Beyond Utopia	Nominated	
Critics' Choice Documentary Awards	12 November 2023	Best Political Documentary	Beyond Utopia	Nominated	
Critics' Choice Documentary Awards	12 November 2023	Best Director	Madeleine Gavin	Nominated	
Critics' Choice Documentary Awards	12 November 2023	Best Editing	Madeleine Gavin	Nominated	
IndieWire Critics Poll	11 December 2023	Best Documentary	Beyond Utopia	7th Place	
Chicago Film Critics Association Awards	12 December 2023	Best Documentary Film	Beyond Utopia	Nominated	
Las Vegas Film Critics Society	13 December 2023	Best Documentary	Beyond Utopia	Nominated	
St. Louis Film Critics Association	17 December 2023	Best Documentary Film	Beyond Utopia	Nominated	
Indiana Film Journalists Association	17 December 2023	Best Documentary	Beyond Utopia	Nominated	
North Texas Film Critics Association	18 December 2023	Best Documentary Film	Beyond Utopia	Nominated	
Women Film Critics Circle Awards	18 December 2023	Best Documentary by or About Women	Beyond Utopia	Nominated	
Alliance of Women Film Journalists	3 January 2024	Best Documentary	Beyond Utopia	Nominated	
Georgia Film Critics Association Awards	5 January 2024	Best Documentary Film	Beyond Utopia	Runner-up	
Astra Film and Creative Arts Awards	6 January 2024	Best Documentary Feature	Beyond Utopia	Nominated	
Seattle Film Critics Society Awards	8 January 2024	Best Documentary Feature	Beyond Utopia	Nominated	
San Francisco Bay Area Film Critics Circle Awards	9 January 2024	Best Documentary Film	Beyond Utopia	Nominated	
Austin Film Critics Association Awards	10 January 2024	Best Documentary	Beyond Utopia	Nominated	
Cinema Eye Honors	12 January 2024	Audience Choice Prize	Beyond Utopia	Nominated	
Cinema Eye Honors	12 January 2024	Outstanding Production	Jana Edelbaum, Rachel Cohen and Sue Mi Terry	Nominated	
Denver Film Critics Society	12 January 2024	Best Documentary Feature	Beyond Utopia	Nominated	
Houston Film Critics Society	22 January 2024	Best Documentary Feature	Beyond Utopia	Nominated	
Directors Guild of America Awards	10 February 2024	Outstanding Directing – Documentary	Madeleine Gavin	Nominated	
Producers Guild of America Awards	25 February 2024	Outstanding Producer of Documentary Theatrical Motion Pictures	Beyond Utopia	Nominated	
Primetime Creative Arts Emmy Awards	7–8 September 2024	Exceptional Merit in Documentary Filmmaking	Lois Vossen, Jana Edelbaum, Rachel Cohen, Sue Mi Terry, Madeleine Gavin	Nominated	
