= Nikki Keddie =

American orientalist (born 1930)

Nikki Reichard Keddie (née Anita Ragozin, August 30, 1930) is an American scholar of Eastern, Iranian, and women's history. She is Professor Emerita of History at University of California, Los Angeles.

== Biography ==
Keddie was born in Brooklyn, New York. She received her B.A. at Radcliffe College, her M.A. from Stanford University and her Ph.D. from the University of California, Berkeley. She has taught at University of Arizona and Scripps College in Claremont, California, before joining University of California, where she taught mainly Middle Eastern and Iranian history and eventually became full professor.

== Recognition ==
- 1994 Elected a fellow of the American Academy of Arts and Sciences
- 2001 Mentoring award of Middle East Studies Association, which also made her an honorary fellow in 2003
- 2002 Award for scholarly distinction from the American Historical Association
- 2002 Persian History award from the Encyclopedia Iranica Foundation
- 2004 Balzan Prize
- 2008 Lifetime Achievement Award for Iranian Studies from the International Society for Iranian Studies

== Works ==
- Iran and the Surrounding World: Interactions in Culture and Cultural Politics, eds. Rudi Matthee and Nikki R.Keddie (University of Washington Press, 2011).
- Women in the Middle East: Past and Present, Princeton University Press, 2007.
- Modern Iran: Roots and Results of Revolution, Yale University Press, 2003.
- Qajar Iran and the Rise of Reza Khan. Mazda, Costa Mesa, CA, 1999.
- Debating gender, debating sexuality. NYU Press, 1996 ISBN 978-0814746554
- Debating Revolutions. NYU Press, 1995.
- Iran and the Muslim World: Resistance and Revolution, Macmillan, London, and New York, New York University (NYU) Press, 1995
- Roots of Revolution: An Interpretive History of Modern Iran, Yale University Press, 1981.
- Iran: Religion, Politics and Society, Frank Cass, London, 1980
- Sayyid Jamal al-Din "al-Afghani": A Political Biography, University of California Press, Berkeley, 1972.
- An Islamic Response to Imperialism, University of California Press, 1968.
- Religion and Rebellion in Iran: The Tobacco Protest of 1891–92, Frank Cass, 1966.
