= John Obert Voll =

American scholar of Islam

John Obert Voll is an American scholar of Islam and Professor Emeritus of Islamic History at Georgetown University in Washington, DC.

== Biography ==
After graduating from Dartmouth College, Voll earned a master's degree in Middle Eastern studies and a doctorate in history and Middle Eastern studies from Harvard University. Before coming to Georgetown, he spent thirty years teaching Middle Eastern and international history at the University of New Hampshire. He has served as president of both the Middle East Studies Association and the New England Historical Association. Voll has served on the boards of directors of the American Council of Learned Societies, the Sudan Studies Association, the World History Association, the New Hampshire Humanities Council, and the New Hampshire Council on World Affairs. He has lived in Sudan, Egypt, Lebanon, and Israel, and has conducted research on Islamic movements in Sub-Saharan Africa, East and Southeast Asia, and the Middle East.

== Works ==
- Eightteenth Century Revival and Reform in Islam edited with Nehemia Levtzion
- Islam: Continuity and Change in the Modern World
- Islam and Democracy after the Arab Spring with John Esposito and Tamara Sonn
- Makers of Contemporary Islam with John Esposito
- Islam and Democracy with John L. Esposito
- Historical Dictionary of the Sudan with Carolyn Fluehr-Lobban and Richard Lobban
- The Sudan: Unity and Diversity in a Multicultural Society with Sarah Potts Voll
