= The Chesterton Review =

- Discipline: Religious studies, literature, theology
- Language: English, French, Italian, Portuguese, Spanish
- Edited by: Dermot Quinn

Publication details
- History: 1974-present
- Publisher: G.K. Chesterton Institute for Faith & Culture (United States)
- Frequency: Quarterly

Standard abbreviations
- ISO 4: Chesterton Rev.

Indexing
- ISSN: 0317-0500 (print); 1930-1294 (web)
- LCCN: 80-644031
- OCLC no.: 2247651

Links
- Journal homepage; Online access

The Chesterton Review is the peer-reviewed academic journal of the G. K. Chesterton Institute for Faith & Culture at Seton Hall University. It was established in 1974 to promote an interest in all aspects of G. K. Chesterton's life, work, art, and ideas, including his Christian apologetics. The journal includes essays and articles written by Chesterton, and occasionally publishes special issues on particular topics. It also publishes special editions in Spanish, Portuguese, French, and Italian. Founded by the Canadian Catholic priest Ian Boyd, editor-in-chief is Dermot Quinn. The journal is available in both print and electronic formats from the Philosophy Documentation Center.

== Abstracting and indexing ==
The Chesterton Review is abstracted and indexed in the ATLA Religion Database and MLA International Bibliography.

== Editions in other languages ==
- The Chesterton Review en Español, ISSN 2162-853X, established 2006
- The Chesterton Review em Português, ISSN 2162-8548, established 2009
- The Chesterton Review en Français, ISSN 2162-8602, established 2010
- The Chesterton Review in Italiano, ISSN 2162-3589, established 2011
