= The Politics of Social Change in the Middle East and North Africa =

1963 book by Manfred Halpern

- Author: Manfred Halpern
- Language: English
- Genre: Non-fiction
- Publisher: Princeton University Press
- Publication date: 1963

The Politics of Social Change in the Middle East and North Africa is a 1963 book by Manfred Halpern. For years it was "the only academic treatment of Islamism," and served as "the basic text" on the politics of the Arab world for a generation of students.

Politics of Social change was written at the behest of the RAND Corporation and published by Princeton University Press. It was widely reviewed and went through 6 printings.

== Neo-Islamic totalitarianism ==
Halpern describes the Muslim Brotherhood and similar Islamist movements as a new kind of "Neo-Islamic Totalitarianism" best understood as a uniquely Islamic form of fascism. He argued that it is distinctive in drawing on a deeply Islamic apocalyptic tradition whereby at times of crises "an apocalyptic vision of spiritual and political redemption" comes to the fore. That modernity and urbanization deprived enormous numbers of people of livelihoods, and attracting many to faith and to an ideological rejection of material goods, while the literacy produced by urban life and modernity enable them to access religious texts. And that Islamic fascism drew these seekers to charismatic leaders who offered "an intoxicating sense of nihilism" in an atmosphere in which leaders made martyrdom into a spiritual goal and followers were "sent to death as robots" with the "illusion of dying as martyrs".

He described the Muslim Brotherhood as aiming to unify all Muslims under a new caliphate.

== Criticism ==
Frédéric Volpi argues that Halpern's work represents a mix of mid-Cold War and orientalism. Volpi defines "orientalism" (lower-case) thus: "By orientalism, I mean an approach to Islam that tries to build a comprehensive and systematic picture of an Islamic civilization, with its own logic and system of values."
