= Lee So-yeon (defector) =

North Korean soldier and defector (1976-)

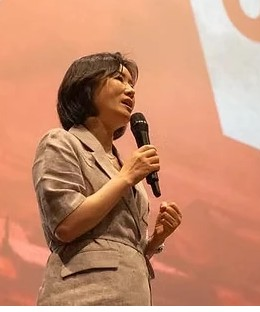
Lee So-yeon, speaking about Beyond Utopia at Camp Humphreys, South Korea, June 17, 2025

Lee So-yeon (Korean: 이소연) was born in North Korea, probably in 1976, to a university professor father. Her hometown is Hoeryong, North Hamgyong Province, North Korea. She joined the army in 1992 in order to get more food and other rations. She successfully defected to South Korea on her second attempt and has been active in supporting other defectors, including the support group New Korea Women's Union.

== Army life ==
Lee served in the North Korean army as a sergeant for about 10 years. She was taught to revile Americans; that they were jackals, vampires, and barbarians. The goal was to make South Korea a "sea of fire" and America a "pile of ashes."

While in the army, Lee was stationed in South Hwanghae Province in an all-woman division. Her job was to relay coordinates from the front line to commanders operating artillery pointed at South Korea. She was hungry even in the army. She returned to her hometown of Hoeryeong, along the border with China, upon her discharge from the army. The average soldier was proud of North Korea's nuclear weapons. She said North Korea does not have the power to defeat America. She witnessed a lot of sexual abuse and violence against female soldiers while in the Army. Lee describes Donald Trump as a "cool guy" because he has "guts" and stands up to North Korea.

== Defection ==
After her first attempt to defect failed when she was caught by North Korean soldiers, in 2006, she was imprisoned at hard labor for one year and tortured. The prisoners there were forced to dig in coal mines with their bare hands. She last saw her son when he was 6, just before the first defection attempt. Her second attempt to defect to South Korea in 2008 was successful, though she narrowly escaped being trafficked. She did so by crossing the Tumen River to China. She was shocked at her new found freedom: "I was shocked by freedom — that I didn't need permission to do anything! I couldn't believe there was hot water, hair dryers! I could vote for whomever I wanted. And all the food!"

Once free, Lee did not even know how to order food from a menu. She worked three jobs and put herself through school. Her son tried to escape in 2019 but China repatriated him. He was severely tortured upon being returned to North Korea. Lee has learned he is in a political prison camp but is still alive. Lee is now the director of the New Korea Women's Union, founded in 2011; an organization dedicated to helping female defectors from North Korea and exposed North Korea's abuses against women. Lee is one of the defectors discussed in the 2023 award-winning documentary Beyond Utopia. Lee subsequently married and had another son. The most shocking thing she realized when she came to South Korea was that people had human rights.

== See also ==
- North Korean Defectors' Day
