= International Journal of Middle East Studies =

- Discipline: Middle Eastern studies
- Language: English
- Edited by: Joel Gordon (University of Arkansas); Akram Khater (North Carolina State University) (2015–2019); Beth Baron (2009–2014)

Publication details
- History: 1970–present
- Publisher: Cambridge University Press for the Middle East Studies Association of North America (United States)
- Frequency: Quarterly
- Impact factor: 0.446 (2014)

Standard abbreviations
- ISO 4: Int. J. Middle East Stud.

Indexing
- CODEN: IJMECN
- ISSN: 0020-7438 (print); 1471-6380 (web)
- LCCN: 79015777
- OCLC no.: 48536107

Links
- Journal homepage; Cambridge Journals Online – International Journal of Middle East Studies

The International Journal of Middle East Studies is a scholarly journal published by the Middle East Studies Association of North America (MESA), a learned society.

== See also ==
- Middle East Research and Information Project
- Association for the Study of the Middle East and Africa
- Middle East Quarterly
