= Manfred Halpern =

Manfred Halpern (February 1, 1924 – January 14, 2001) was a transformation theorist, noted scholar of the Middle East, and author of the foundational study of post-imperial politics in the Middle East, The Politics of Social Change in the Middle East and North Africa. He also authored the book Transforming the Personal, Political, Historical, and Sacred in Theory and Practice.

== Early life and education ==
Born to nonobservant Jewish parents in Mittweida, Germany, he fled the Nazi regime as a child with his parents in 1937, settling in New York City where he attended Townsend Harris High School.

Halpern was an undergraduate at UCLA when WWII began. He joined the Army, serving as a battalion scout in the 28th Infantry Division, surviving winter on the side of a tank during the Battle of the Bulge. After Germany surrendered, Halpern served in Counterintelligence helping trace former Nazis in Germany, including in his hometown of Mittweida; he also served as an instructor in the Counterintelligence Corps.

After the War Halpern returned to UCLA and completed his degree, earning his master's degree and doctorate from the School of Advanced International Studies at Johns Hopkins University. Between 1948 and 1958 he served in the State Department in intelligence research as an expert on Near Eastern and North African politics. He was given the Department's Meritorious Service Award in 1952.

== Princeton ==
Halpern joined the faculty of Princeton University in 1958, where he taught until he retired in 1994. Initially offering classes in Middle Eastern politics, Halpern devoted four decades of scholarship to a Theory of Transformation ~ developed through his two Princeton courses "The Sacred and the Political" and "Political and Personal Transformation", as well over 30 scholarly articles, published in book form eight years after Halpern's death.

Halpern's work explores the ways personal, political, historical, and sacred relationships continually change; from the breaking apart of traditional emanational modes of authority, through the fragments of incoherence and deformation, into the kinds of transformations currently seen across all scales in the 21st century.

== Personal life ==
A world traveller and a gardener, Halpern was married twice, with five children and five grandchildren. He died in 2001 in Princeton, New Jersey.

== Books ==
- Halpern, Manfred (1963). The Politics of Social Change in the Middle East and North Africa. Princeton University Press. ISBN 978-0-691-62432-7. JSTOR j.ctt183phfg..
