= Abraham Freije =

Abraham Khalil Freije (also known as Ibrahim Freiji) (May 5, 1906 – May 24, 1997) is the coauthor of the first translation of the history of the United States into the Arabic language, “History of the American People”, published in 1946. The book divides itself into four principal sections: 1) beginnings of the American people; 2) beginning of the American nation (Revolution through the Civil wars); 3) development of the American nation (economics and culture); and 4) America's role in international conflicts.

== Biography ==
Freije was born 1906 in Biskinta, Lebanon, the son of Khahl and Affifi Freije. After graduating from the University of Damascus in 1930 with a law degree, he practiced law in Beirut, Lebanon until 1938, when he immigrated to the United States. Freije married Evelyn Haddad in Brooklyn, NY in 1943. Mr. Freije eventually settled in New London, CT, owning and operating a business on State Street in downtown New London. They had one son, Philip Freije.

== Career ==
When he arrived in the United States, he served in the military intelligence unit of the U.S. Army during World War II, but was released to teach Arabic to the troops, teaching Arabic at Princeton University. Under the supervision of Philip K. Hitti, Freije and Farhat Jacob Ziadeh began work on the first full-length history of the United States ever to appear in Arabic. Hitti supervised the project with the cooperation of Princeton's Department of Oriental Languages and Department of History. The three co-authors finalized the roughly 350-page book entitled, “History of the American People,” and published the book under Princeton University Press. The book was printed at the American Press, Beirut, to accommodate the need for Arabic printing by linotype. The book release was also timed to coincide with the first visit by the Crown Prince of Saudi Arabia, Prince Saud Al-Saud, to the United States, which included a stop at Princeton as part of his nationwide tour at the invitation of President Harry S. Truman.
