= Ian Boyd (academic) =

Canadian Catholic priest (1935–2024)

Ian Boyd CSB
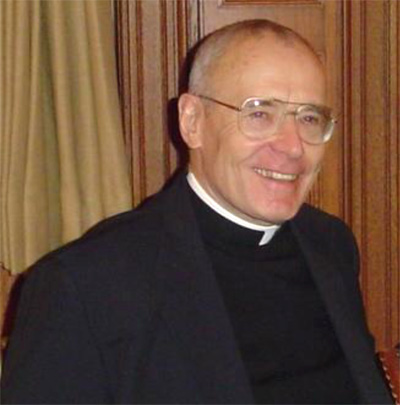

Personal life
- Born: January 23, 1935 Prince Albert, Saskatchewan, Canada
- Died: January 10, 2024 (aged 88) Edmonton, Alberta, Canada
- Education: University of Saskatchewan; University of Toronto; University of Aberdeen

Religious life
- Religion: Catholic
- Order: Congregation of St. Basil

Ian Boyd CSB (January 23, 1935 – January 10, 2024) was a Canadian Catholic priest of the Congregation of Saint Basil, a professor, and a scholar who specialized in the works of G. K. Chesterton.

== Early life and education ==
Ian Boyd was born on January 23, 1935, in Prince Albert, Saskatchewan, Canada. He graduated from the University of Saskatchewan in 1956 and received a STB from St. Michael's College at the University of Toronto in 1964. In 1970, he graduated with a PhD from the University of Aberdeen.

== Academic career ==
Boyd dedicated his academic career to the study and promotion of Chesterton's literature and thought. He served as the President Emeritus of the G. K. Chesterton Institute for Faith & Culture and was the founding editor of its journal, The Chesterton Review. Boyd's scholarly contributions include authoring "The Novels of G.K. Chesterton" and co-editing "A Hidden Presence—The Catholic Imagination of J. R. R. Tolkien." His lifelong commitment to Chesterton studies and his significant role in academia earned him recognition in literary and Catholic circles worldwide.

In 1974, while at St. Thomas More College, and after attending the Centenary Conference of the Birth of G. K. Chesterton, he founded the G. K. Chesterton Institute for Faith & Culture and its journal The Chesterton Review.

In 1999 upon the invitation of then-President Robert Sheeran, Father Boyd brought both the Institute and the journal to Seton Hall University, where they are permanently housed at the Center for Catholic Studies, from where he retired in 2020.

In December 2022, the G. K. Chesterton Institute for Faith & Culture presented "A Chestertonian Conversation with Father Ian Boyd" – a 27-minute documentary produced and directed by the G. K. Chesterton Institute for Faith & Culture at Seton Hall University.

== Death ==
Boyd died in Edmonton, Alberta on January 10, 2024, at the age of 88.
