= Kim Sungeun =

South Korean human rights activist

- Born: 김성은; January 2, 1965 (age 61); Seoul, South Korea
- Other names: Seungeun Kim
- Occupation: Pastor
- Known for: Human rights activism

Pastor Kim Sungeun (Korean: 김성은; born January 2, 1965), also spelled Seungeun or Sung Eun, is a South Korean human rights activist and director of the Caleb Mission, a Christian organization. He is noted for his work in aiding North Korean defectors to safety in South Korea or elsewhere. He has worked to expose human rights abuses committed by the North Korean government. He has also worked to rescue North Korean orphans and to establish international and domestic laws so that the children can be adopted and raised by families. Pastor Kim gained international recognition for his modern-day "Underground Railroad" ministry, which has rescued over 1,000 North Korean defectors since 2000.

His activities were introduced in various media outlets and were featured prominently in the documentary 'Beyond Utopia'. The film won the Audience Award for American Documentary at the 2023 Sundance Film Festival.
