= Association for the Study of the Middle East and Africa =

Learned society

The Association for the Study of the Middle East and Africa (ASMEA) is an American learned society, dedicated to promoting research and teaching in Middle Eastern and African studies, and related fields.

== Formation ==
The Association for the Study of the Middle East and Africa (ASMEA) was founded on October 24, 2007 by Bernard Lewis of Princeton University and Fouad Ajami of the Hoover Institution as a counter to the Middle East Studies Association of North America (MESA), which they regarded to have become "dominated by academics who have been critical of Israel and of America's role in the Middle East." Lewis and Ajami also cited the increasing politicization of Middle East studies. According to ASMEA's executive director Asaf Romirowsky, ASMEA was formed to counter MESA and its perceived "pro-Palestinian element".

== Conferences ==
ASMEA held its first annual conference in 2008. About 350 people attended the group's conferences before the COVID-19 pandemic. Conference speakers have included former Pakistani ambassador to the United States Husain Haqqani and U.S. Assistant Secretary of State for Near East Affairs David Schenker. Academics who participate in ASMEA conferences, most of whom generally defined themselves as right-of-center, have said that they oppose organizations such as MESA, which they see as espousing anti-Israel or anti-Western sentiment.
