= Fouad Ajami =

Lebanese–American academic (1945 – 2014)

Fouad Ajami فؤاد عجمي
- Born: September 18, 1945; Arnoun, Greater Lebanon
- Died: June 22, 2014 (aged 68); Maine, United States
- Occupations: professor, writer
- Years active: 1973–2014
- Known for: Proponent of Iraq War
- Spouse: Michelle
- Awards: MacArthur Fellowship (1982) National Humanities Medal (2006) Bradley Prize (2006); Benjamin Franklin Award for public service (2011); Eric Breindel Award for Excellence in Opinion Journalism (2011)

Academic background
- Education: Eastern Oregon College; University of Washington

Academic work
- Discipline: Middle Eastern studies
- Institutions: Johns Hopkins University, Hoover Institution & Princeton University
- Main interests: Middle Eastern studies
- Notable works: The Arab Predicament (1981); The Dream Palace of the Arabs: A Generation’s Odyssey (1998)

Fouad A. Ajami (Arabic: فؤاد عجمي, romanized: Fuʾād ʿAjamī; September 18, 1945 – June 22, 2014) was a Lebanese-born American professor and writer on Middle Eastern issues. He was a senior fellow at Stanford University's Hoover Institution.

Ajami was an outspoken supporter of the Bush Doctrine and the 2003 invasion of Iraq, which he believed to have been a "noble war" and a "gift" to the people of Iraq.

== Early life and education ==
Ajami was born in Arnoun, a rocky hamlet in the south of Lebanon into a Shia Muslim family. His Shia great-grandfather had immigrated to Arnoun from Tabriz, Iran in the 1850s. In Arabic, the word "Ajam" means "non-Arab" or "non-Arabic-speaker"; specifically in this context, it means "Persian" or "Persian-speaker." Ajami arrived in the United States in the fall of 1963, just before he turned 18. He did some of his undergraduate work at Eastern Oregon State College (now Eastern Oregon University) in La Grande, Oregon. He did his graduate work at the University of Washington, where he wrote his thesis on international relations and world government, and earned a PhD.

== Career ==
=== Academia ===
In 1973 Ajami joined the politics department of Princeton University. He made a name for himself there as a vocal supporter of Palestinian self-determination. In 1980, the School of Advanced International Studies of Johns Hopkins University named him director of Middle East Studies. He joined the Hoover Institution in 2011.

=== Government ===
Ajami was an advisor to United States Secretary of State Condoleezza Rice as well as a friend and colleague of Paul Wolfowitz.

=== Journalism ===
Ajami was a frequent contributor on Middle Eastern issues and contemporary international history to The New York Times Book Review, Foreign Affairs, The New Republic, The Wall Street Journal, as well as other journals and periodicals. He was also a contributor and close friend to Anderson Cooper of CNN. He was also a frequent guest on Fox News Channel's "America's News Headquarters w/ Uma Pemmaraju"

=== Television ===
Ajami frequently appeared on PBS, CBS, CNN and Fox News.

== Nephew's link to killing of cleric ==
On 16 February 1984 two agents of the Israeli Shin Bet, acting on orders from Meir Dagan and working as members of the terrorist Front for the Liberation of Lebanon from Foreigners (a front organization for the Israel Defense Forces) killed Lebanese Shia imam and militant Ragheb Harb. Hussein Abbas, one of the assassins, was a nephew of Ajami, and after the assassination he fled to America where he lived in the home of his uncle.

== Books ==
In "The Fate of Nonalignment," an essay in the Winter 1980/81 issue of the journal Foreign Affairs, Ajami outlined how in his opinion the third world has fared in a context of nonalignment in post Cold War politics. In 1980, he accepted an offer from Johns Hopkins University to become director of Middle East Studies at their international relations graduate program in Washington, D.C.: the Paul H. Nitze School of Advanced International Studies (SAIS). He holds an endowed chair as the Majid Khadduri professor.

A year after arriving at SAIS, Ajami published his first book, The Arab Predicament, which analyzed what Ajami described as an intellectual and political crisis that swept the Arab world following its defeat by Israel in the 1967 Six-Day War.

Subsequently, Ajami has written several other books: The Dream Palace of the Arabs: A Generation's Odyssey (1998), Beirut: City of Regrets (1988), and The Vanished Imam: Musa Al-Sadr and the Shia of Lebanon (1986).

In The Dream Palace of the Arabs: A Generation's Odyssey, Ajami surveyed the intellectual landscape in the Arab world and Iran, in what was in some ways an autobiography as well as a sequel to "The Arab Predicament." On Middle Eastern politics, he wrote of "a world where triumph rarely comes with mercy or moderation." On Pan-Arabism, he described the ideology as "Sunni dominion dressed in secular garb."

Ajami's book The Foreigner's Gift: The Americans, The Arabs and The Iraqis in Iraq (2006), is about the American invasion of Iraq.

Crosswinds: The Way of Saudi Arabia (2020), was published posthumously, by the Hoover Institute.

== Philosophy ==
=== View of Huntington's "Clash of Civilizations" ===
One notable contribution Ajami made in the September October 1993 issue of Foreign Affairs was a rebuttal to Samuel Huntington’s "The Clash of Civilizations?", regarding the state and future of international relations after the Cold War. According to Judith Miller, Ajami continued to argue that militant Islamism of the type represented by Al Qaeda had peaked and was fading into insignificance.

Huntington presents a world divided at the highest level into eight civilizations, and includes a number of countries that are "torn" between two civilizations, arguing that these civilizational divides are far more fundamental than economic interests, ideology, and regimes, and that the world is becoming a smaller place with increasingly close interactions. He further claims that the pre-eminence of a so-called "kin-country" syndrome will provide a civilizational rallying point that will replace political ideology and traditional "balance of power" considerations for relations between states and nations, resulting in a division between the West and "the rest" creating a backlash against Western values (which supposedly "differ fundamentally" from those prevalent in other civilizations).

In his article "The Summoning", Ajami criticises Huntington for ignoring the empirical complexities and state interests which drive conflicts in and between civilizations. Ajami believes that states will remain the dominant factor influencing the global framework and interaction. He also argues that civilizational ties are only utilized by states and groups when it is in their best interest to do so and that modernity and secularism are here to stay, especially in places with considerable struggles to obtain them, and he cites the example of the Indian middle class. Ajami also believes that civilizations do not control states; rather, states control civilizations.

Ajami later relented on his initial criticism of Huntington's theories in the January 6, 2008 issue of the New York Times Book Review in an article titled "The Clash" in which he wrote that "Huntington’s thesis about a civilizational clash seems more compelling to me than the critique I provided at that time."

=== Support for Iraq War ===
Ajami was an outspoken supporter of the Iraq War, which he believed “issued out of a deep American frustration... with the culture of terrorism that had put down roots in Arab lands."

In an August 2002 speech before the Veterans of Foreign Wars, US Vice President Dick Cheney sought to assuage concerns about the anticipated US invasion of Iraq, stating: "As for the reaction of the Arab 'street,' the Middle East expert Professor Fouad Ajami predicts that after liberation, the streets in Basra and Baghdad are 'sure to erupt in joy in the same way the throngs in Kabul greeted the Americans.'"

Ajami cautioned the United States about the likely negative consequences of the Iraq War. In a 2003 essay in Foreign Affairs, "Iraq and the Arabs' Future," Ajami wrote,

There should be no illusions about the sort of Arab landscape that America is destined to find if, or when, it embarks on a war against the Iraqi regime. There would be no "hearts and minds" to be won in the Arab world, no public diplomacy that would convince the overwhelming majority of Arabs that this war would be a just war. An American expedition in the wake of thwarted UN inspections would be seen by the vast majority of Arabs as an imperial reach into their world, a favor to Israel, or a way for the United States to secure control over Iraq's oil. No hearing would be given to the great foreign power.

But he also goes on to say:

America ought to be able to live with this distrust and discount a good deal of this anti-Americanism as the "road rage" of a thwarted Arab world – the congenital condition of a culture yet to take full responsibility for its self-inflicted wounds. There is no need to pay excessive deference to the political pieties and givens of the region. Indeed, this is one of those settings where a reforming foreign power's simpler guidelines offer a better way than the region's age-old prohibitions and defects.

Ajami retained a positive view of the war three years later. In a 2006 book on the invasion and its aftermath, he described it as a noble effort, and argued that despite many unhappy consequences, it was too soon to write it off as a failure.

Vice President Cheney cited Ajami again in an October 21, 2007 speech to the Washington Institute for Near East Policy, stating, "We have no illusions about the road ahead. As Fouad Ajami said recently, Iraq is not yet 'a country at peace, and all its furies have not burned out, but a measure of order has begun to stick on the ground.'"

Eight days after U.S. President Barack Obama took office, a Wall Street Journal op-ed piece by Ajami called Obama a "messenger of the old, settled ways," claimed that the George W. Bush administration's diplomacy had had "revolutionary impact," and chided Obama for not praising the Iraq War. Ajami credited the Egyptian Revolution and Tunisian revolution to the Iraq War and Bush's advocacy of democracy:

[Bush] can definitely claim paternity...One despot fell in 2003. We decapitated him. Two despots, in Tunisia and Egypt, fell, and there is absolutely a direct connection between what happened in Iraq in 2003 and what's happening today throughout the rest of the Arab world.

He also stated, however, that

It wasn't American tanks [that brought about this moment]...It was a homegrown enterprise. It was Egyptians, Tunisians, Libyans conquering their fear – people went out and conquered fear and did something amazing.

In June 2011, Ajami wrote an article for The New Republic arguing that the U.S. troops should remain in Iraq, writing that "the United States will have to be prepared for and accept the losses and adversity that are an integral part of staying on, rightly, in so tangled and difficult a setting." On June 13, 2011, he wrote in The Wall Street Journal about the unrest in Syria that "The mask of the Assad regime finally falls..."

== Death ==
On June 22, 2014, Ajami died from prostate cancer at a summer home in Maine, aged 68.

== Awards ==
Ajami was a 1982 winner of a five-year MacArthur Prize Fellowship in the arts and sciences. In 2006, he was awarded the National Humanities Medal by President Bush, and the Bradley Prize, and in 2011 he earned the Benjamin Franklin Award for public service, and the Eric Breindel Award for Excellence in Opinion Journalism.

== Memberships ==
Ajami was a member of the board of directors of the Council on Foreign Relations, and the board of advisors of the journal Foreign Affairs. Ajami was a founding member of ASMEA (The Association for the Study of the Middle East and Africa) and was vice chairman of its academic council. Ajami also sat on the editorial board of Middle East Quarterly, a publication of the Middle East Forum think tank. He was a senior fellow at the Hoover Institution and the cochair of their Working Group on Islamism and the International Order.
