= Anti-Iranian sentiment in Azerbaijan =

Hostility towards Iran in Azerbaijan

Anti-Iranian sentiment in Azerbaijan dates back to 1918 when the first Azerbaijani nation was emerging under a pan-Turkist ideology. From thenceforward, political elites with pan-Turkist-oriented sentiments in the area that comprises the present-day Azerbaijan Republic have depended on the concept of ethnic nationalism to create an anti-Iranian sense of ethnicity among Iranian Azerbaijanis. Azerbaijan's post-Soviet national identity is strongly anti-Iranian and primarily Turkocentric. It has been built in various ways to oppose Iran as "the other," not just as a country but also as a culture and historical entity. Nowadays, being Azerbaijani means rejecting any ties to Iran. The belief that Azerbaijanis have been and continue to be victims of Iranians (and Armenians) is planted in children through state-sponsored propaganda and brainwashing in schools.

== Background ==
Historically, the name "Azerbaijan" referred to the region south of the Aras River, in present-day northwestern Iran. The historical name of the present-day Republic of Azerbaijan was Arran and Shirvan. Before the 20th century, the Azerbaijanis did not constitute a nation or a clear-cut ethnic group. The people who lived in the present-day country of Azerbaijan identified as either Muslims of the ummah (community), or Turks, who shared a language family spread out throughout a considerable portion of Central Asia, or as Persians. In October 1917, the people in Baku were not interested in referring to the region in the south Caucasus as "Azerbaijan". The local populace was frequently included under terms such as Türk milleti ("Turkish nation") and Qafqaziya müsalman Xalqi ("the Muslim people of the Caucasus"). The name of the first Constituent Assembly, which was founded on 29 April 1917 in Baku, was "General Assembly of the Caucasian Muslims". Iran was in the midst of deterioration and revolution when the formation of the Azerbaijani national identity was taking place, and therefore it did not provide an ideal role model or source of inspiration. Iran was perceived by some intellectuals in Baku as a "backward society" with a long history of "oriental despotism" and Shia clericalism. The linguistic differences with Iran was the deciding element in the decision of the Azerbaijanis, and thus pan-Turkism was chosen over pro-Iranianism.

== History ==
=== Musavat Party (1918) ===
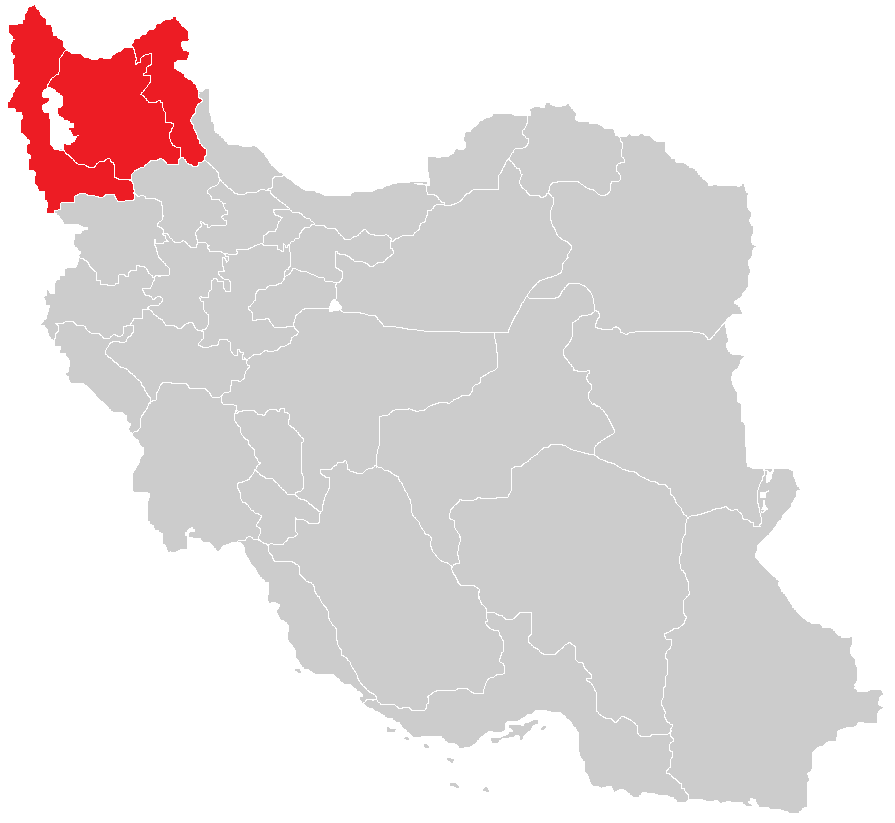
Map of the historical Azerbaijan region (also known as Iranian Azerbaijan) in northwestern Iran

Since 1918, political elites with pan-Turkist-oriented sentiments in the area that comprises the present-day Azerbaijan Republic have depended on the concept of ethnic nationalism to create an anti-Iranian sense of ethnicity among Iranian Azerbaijanis. Over the past century, Iranian nationalism has effectively dealt with the military, political, and argumentative threats aimed toward Iranian Azerbaijan. The Baku-based Musavat party addressed the topic of Iranian Azerbaijan for the first time in an editorial that was published in their Açiq Söz newspaper in January 1918. The author outlined Azerbaijan's "historical borders" as extending from Tbilisi on the west to the Caspian Sea on the east, with the Caucasus Mountains in the north and Kermanshah in the south. He placed the blame for the measures that led to the "division of the nation of Azerbaijan" on the Iranian ruling class and Russian expansionists. The author also claimed that it was the "natural right of the South Caucasus Muslims to call their territory Azerbaijan" and that they hoped that "one day their brothers in the south could join them".

The local Baku Committee of the Iranian Democrat Party was the first to respond to these irredentist claims. Recruited from the Iranian Azerbaijani population in Baku and its neighbouring areas, the committee had been established by Mohammad Khan Tarbiyat in 1914. Considering the editorial published by the Musavat party as an attempt by pan-Turkists to undermine the territorial integrity and sovereignty of Iran, they responded by publishing the bilingual newspaper Azarbayjan, Joz-e la-yanfakk-e Iran ("Azerbaijan, an Inseparable Part of Iran") on 10 February 1918. When the Musavat party established the Azerbaijan Democratic Republic in May 1918, they forced the newspaper to close.

=== Under the Azerbaijan Democratic Republic (1918–1920) ===
The foundation of the Azerbaijan Democratic Republic marked the start of Azerbaijan as both state and nation. The Iranian political and intellectual elites in Tehran and Tabriz, the capital of Iranian Azerbaijan, swiftly objected against the adoption of the name "Azerbaijan" despite the fact that the weak Iranian state was in a transitional phase and fighting against foreign dominance. The written media in Tehran, Tabriz, and other major Iranian cities, on the one hand, and the media in Baku, the capital of the newly established Republic of Azerbaijan, on the other hand, presented their cases to support the correctness or incorrectness of such designation for about a year. Iranians generally viewed Baku's decision with suspicion and believed that the Ottoman Young Turks, who were then active in Baku, had conspired to take over the historical name of Iran's northwest province to establish a pan-Turk entity spanning Central Asia and Europe. The pan-Turkists were able to argue that the Republic of Azerbaijan and "southern Azerbaijan" must be united in their future "Turan" by referring to the historical Azerbaijan in Iran as "southern Azerbaijan." The head of the Democrat Party, Mohammad Khiabani, a well-liked member of Iranian Azerbaijan's political elite, changed the name of the province to Azadistan ("land of freedom") out of concern for such risks. The phrase "Caucasian Azerbaijan" was thus used in the documents intended for international distribution by the Azerbaijani government to ease Iranian concerns.

In a number of seminars at Baku State University in November and December 1924, the distinguished Soviet orientalist Vasily Bartold talked about the purpose suggested by this designation; "however, the term Azerbaijan was chosen, because when the Azerbaijani republic was established, it was supposed that the Persian and this Azerbaijan would form one entity, since they have a very large similarity in the composition of their populations."

=== Under the Soviet Union (1920–1991) ===
Several myths about Azerbaijan's history and its links with Iran were created between the time the Azerbaijan Democratic Republic was conquered by the Bolsheviks in 1920 and the period that its heritage reappeared as encouragement for the country's new nationalists in the 1980s. The development of Azerbaijan's post-Soviet identity has been substantially impacted by these myths.

One myth was that the Turks were colonized and subjugated by the Persians. According to Eldar Mamedov, this "flies in the face of historical reality. It was the various Turko-Mongol groups that invaded Iran several times, killed millions of Iranians, and ruled over them for several centuries. If any colonization, including linguistic change, was done, it was by Turks." It was the Soviet Union who initially popularized the idea of "Persian colonialism" after it was forced to withdraw its forces from the Iranian province of Azerbaijan in 1946 due to its failure to establish an independent republic there. Another myth was of a united Azerbaijan that was "divided by treacherous Persians" was also established. However, a southern and a northern Azerbaijan are not mentioned in historical accounts. The existence of two Azerbaijans is not mentioned in any historical or geographical writings in either the Russian Empire or rest of Europe.

According to a more recent revisionist theory, Russia and Iran plotted to split up Azerbaijan in the 19th century. Commenting on this, Mamedov states that "Considering that Iran fought two devastating wars with Russia (1803–1813 and 1824–1828), the idea of a Russo-Iranian conspiracy against Azerbaijan is totally absurd." The claim is repeated by the Azerbaijani nationalist poet Bakhtiyar Vahabzadeh in his poem Gülüstan. Today, the majority of Azerbaijani nationalists hold this opinion. As a result, Azerbaijan's post-Soviet national identity is strongly anti-Iranian and primarily Turkocentric. It has been built in various ways to oppose Iran as "the other," not just as a country but also as a culture and historical entity. Nowadays, being Azerbaijani means rejecting any ties to Iran. The belief that Azerbaijanis have been and continue to be victims of Iranians (and Armenians) is planted in children through state-sponsored propaganda and brainwashing in schools.

A literary subgenre known as "a literature of longing" (as described by David Nissman) emerged in the 1950s and 1960s in Soviet Azerbaijani literature and was associated with Iranian Azerbaijan. The majority of literary works about Iranian Azerbaijan were characterized by nationalist sentiments that condemned the country's "division" along the Aras River and denounced things such as the "economic and cultural exploitation of Iranian Azerbaijanis". Literature and history courses in Azerbaijan have incorporated these themes. Strongly expressed anti-Iranian sentiment was a significant byproduct of this literary genre. The Soviet leadership tolerated this anti-Iranian sentiment and even supported it.

=== Under Abulfaz Elchibey ===
The political party known as the Popular Front of Azerbaijan (abbreviated as APF) accelerated the development of a Turkocentric and anti-Iranian national identity. Along with calling for deeper relations with Turkey and other Turkic peoples in Iran and Central Asia, the APF promoted Azerbaijan's Turkic identity. In an attempt to reshape Azerbaijan in the likeness of Turkey, it went further beyond Turkicness, trying to imitate the founder of the Republic of Turkey, Mustafa Kemal Atatürk. Thus, the old Turkicness gave way to Turkishness. Being Turkic was no longer enough; it was important to become Turkish, like the people of Turkey.

Anti-Iranian sentiment was closely associated with the Turkism of the APF. Their leader Abulfaz Elchibey had a deep-seated disdain of Iran, much like Mahammad Amin Rasulzade. He and other nationalists developed a fixation with the "re-unification of northern and southern (Iranian) Azerbaijan." Elchibey promised that "once Karabakh was liberated, Tabriz will follow." This trend of Turkish nationalism was also fostered by outside forces, as it was in 1918. This Turkist movement was supported by Western countries, particularly the United States. To them, Turkish nationalism stood in the way of the Islamic ideology that Iran might otherwise have spread to the newly formed Azerbaijan republic.

=== Under the Aliyevs ===
This pan-Turkist zeal was slightly reduced after Heydar Aliyev returned to power in June 1993 and Elchibey resigned as president. Aliyev recognized that extreme Turkification measures in Azerbaijan may antagonize the country's non-Turkic ethnic minorities (including groups such as the Talysh and Lezgins) as well as its educated Russian speakers, some of them being ethnic Azerbaijanis. He was also aware of how much these actions infuriated Russia and Iran.

Reducing the pan-Turkist discourse did not, however, mean weakening Turkism, which remains a cornerstone of Azerbaijan's post-Soviet national identity and one of its primary efforts to build the nation. The idea of "uniting" "northern" and "southern Azerbaijan", and Ataturkist secularism are among the other tenets of APF philosophy that persist under the Aliyevs, albeit to differing degrees. Simultaneously, Azerbaijan is making large-scale attempts to eradicate any traces of Persian cultural influence. This includes removing Persian-written tiles from the Nizami Mausoleum, prohibiting the publication of Azerbaijani poets' works in their original Persian, and removing additional Persian inscriptions from historic structures. According to Mamedov; "Ironically, in creating a history and culture for Azerbaijan, its leaders have appropriated Iran’s historical and cultural heritage, while claiming for them a Turkic character."

The Iranian rebel Babak Khorramdin, who founded his own cult and fought the Arabs, has been claimed to have been a "Turk" by Azerbaijan. Zoroaster, the Iranian prophet, is also claimed to have been a "Turk". They also claim that the Iranian New Year, Nowruz, has Turkic roots. Additional instances of Iran's history being appropriated are the assertions that the game of polo and the tar string instrument were solely invented by Azerbaijan.

Apart from the governing political elites and political parties, certain intellectuals and academics from Azerbaijan have actively contributed to preserving the ethnic component as an important component in the relationship between Iran and Azerbaijan. This includes Nasib Nasibli, a university professor and member of the Azerbaijani parliament, known for strong advocacy for a "unified Azerbaijan". Since Elchibey's presidency, Nasibli had been ambassador to Iran, possibly due to his extreme views. It is possible that Tehran was unhappy with his overtly anti-Iranian position, as his career as an ambassador came to an abrupt end in 1994. During his stay in Tehran, he had even attempted to set up ethnic organizations among Iranian Azerbaijani students.

While Ilham Aliyev has attempted to dismiss claims that his government is taking any anti-Iranian ethnic nationalist positions, the Iranian government and groups like Iranian nationalist circles, especially Iranian Azerbaijanis, are dubious about the intentions of the Azerbaijani government due to the ongoing actions of irredentist elements like Congress of World Azerbaijanis or Southern Azerbaijan National Awakening Movement and the support that they receive from Azerbaijani authorities, both state and non-state. Parviz Varjavand, a professor at a university and the secretary general of the National Front party in Iran, wrote an open letter to Mohammad Khatami during his presidency (1997–2005) alerting him to the anti-Iranian actions of Elchibey's followers as well as those of other pan-Turkist organizations and the media, and requesting that Khatami take appropriate action to deal with them.

Because of Azerbaijan's anti-Iran and pan-Turkist views, as well as its irredentist claims to Iranian Azerbaijan, Iran more or less supported Armenia in the Nagorno-Karabakh conflict with Azerbaijan, albeit discreetly.

== See also ==
- Anti-Armenian sentiment in Azerbaijan

== Sources ==
- Ahmadi, Hamid (2016). "The Clash of Nationalisms: Iranian Response to Baku's Irredentism". In Kamrava, Mehran (ed.). The Great Game in West Asia: Iran, Turkey and the South Caucasus. Oxford University Press. pp. 102–140. ISBN 978-0190673604.
- Ahmadoghlu, Ramin (2020). "Secular nationalist revolution and the construction of the Azerbaijani identity, nation and state". Nations and Nationalism. 27 (2). Wiley: 548–565. doi:10.1111/nana.12682. S2CID 229387710.
- Astourian, Stephan H. (2023). "Origins, Main Themes and Underlying Psychological Disposition of Azerbaijani Nationalism". In Dorfmann-Lazarev, Igor; Khatchadourian, Haroutioun (eds.). Monuments and Identities in the Caucasus Karabagh, Nakhichevan and Azerbaijan in Contemporary Geopolitical Conflict. Brill. pp. 206–236. ISBN 978-90-04-67738-8.
- Atabaki, Touraj (2001). "Recasting Oneself, Rejecting the Other: Pan-Turkism and Iranian Nationalism". In van Schendel, Willem; Zürcher, Erik J. (eds.). Identity Politics in Central Asia and the Muslim World: Nationalism, Ethnicity and Labour in the Twentieth Century. I.B. Tauris. pp. 65–84. ISBN 978-1860642616.
- Atabaki, Touraj (2006). Iran and the First World War: Battleground of the Great Powers. I.B.Tauris. ISBN 978-1860649646.
- Behrooz, Maziar (2023). Iran at War: Interactions with the Modern World and the Struggle with Imperial Russia. I.B. Tauris. ISBN 978-0-7556-3737-9.
- Bournoutian, George (2011). The 1823 Russian Survey of the Karabagh Province. A Primary Source on the Demography and Economy of Karabagh in the First Half of the 19th Century. Mazda Publishers. ISBN 978-1-56859-173-5.
- Bournoutian, George (2018). Armenia and Imperial Decline: The Yerevan Province, 1900–1914. Milton Park, Abingdon, Oxon: Routledge. ISBN 978-1-351-06260-2. OCLC 1037283914.
- Broers, Laurence (2019). Armenia and Azerbaijan: Anatomy of a Rivalry. Edinburgh University Press. ISBN 978-1-4744-5052-2.
- Dorfmann-Lazarev, Igor (2023). "Stalin's Legacy in the Post-Soviet Nations and the Genesis of Nationalist Extremism in Azerbaijan". In Dorfmann-Lazarev, Igor; Khatchadourian, Haroutioun (eds.). Monuments and Identities in the Caucasus Karabagh, Nakhichevan and Azerbaijan in Contemporary Geopolitical Conflict. Brill. pp. 237–305. ISBN 978-90-04-67738-8.
- Floor, Willem M.; Javadi, Hasan (2009). The heavenly rose-garden: a history of Shirvan & Daghestan, by Abbas Qoli Aqa Bakikhanov. Mage Publishers. ISBN 978-1933823270.
- Fowkes, B. (2002). Ethnicity and Ethnic Conflict in the Post-Communist World. Springer. ISBN 978-0-333-79256-8.
- Hunter, Shireen T. (2017). "Introduction". In Hunter, Shireen T. (ed.). The New Geopolitics of the South Caucasus: Prospects for Regional Cooperation and Conflict Resolution. Lexington Books. pp. ix–xxvii. ISBN 978-1498564960.
- Gasimov, Zaur (2022). "Observing Iran from Baku: Iranian Studies in Soviet and Post-Soviet Azerbaijan". Iranian Studies. 55 (1). Cambridge University: 37–59. doi:10.1080/00210862.2020.1865136.
- Giragosian, Richard (2017). "Twenty-Five Years On: Armenia's Difficult Period of State-Building". In Hunter, Shireen T. (ed.). The New Geopolitics of the South Caucasus: Prospects for Regional Cooperation and Conflict Resolution. Lexington Books. pp. 3–27. ISBN 978-1498564960.
- Mamedov, Eldar (2017). "Azerbaijan Twenty-Five Years after Independence: Accomplishments and Shortcomings". In Hunter, Shireen T. (ed.). The New Geopolitics of the South Caucasus: Prospects for Regional Cooperation and Conflict Resolution. Lexington Books. pp. 27–64. ISBN 978-1498564960.
- Multiple authors (1987). "Azerbaijan". In Yarshater, Ehsan (ed.). Encyclopædia Iranica. Vol. III/2: Awāʾel al-maqālāt–Azerbaijan IV. London and New York: Routledge & Kegan Paul. pp. 205–257. ISBN 978-0-71009-114-7.
- Morozova, Irina (2005). "Contemporary Azerbaijani Historiography on the Problem of "Southern Azerbaijan" after World War II". Iran and the Caucasus. 9 (1): 85–120. doi:10.1163/1573384054068114.
- Rezvani, Babak (2015-01-27). Conflict and Peace in Central Eurasia. International Comparative Social Studies. Vol. 31. Brill. ISBN 978-90-04-27636-9.
- Suvari, Çakir Ceyhan (2012). "Turkey and Azerbaijan: On the Myth of Sharing the same Origin and Culture". Iran and the Caucasus. 16 (2): 247–256. doi:10.1163/1573384X-20120011.
- Yilmaz, Harun (2013). "The Soviet Union and the Construction of Azerbaijani National Identity in the 1930s". Iranian Studies. 46 (4): 511–533. doi:10.1080/00210862.2013.784521. S2CID 144322861.
