= Azerbaijani national identity =

National identity of the Azerbaijani people of Azerbaijan

Flag of Azerbaijan, first adopted in 1918 with slightly different colours by the Azerbaijan Democratic Republic

Azerbaijani national identity is a term referring to the sense of national identity, as embodied in the shared and characteristic culture, language and traditions, of the Azerbaijani people of Azerbaijan.

== History ==
=== Background ===
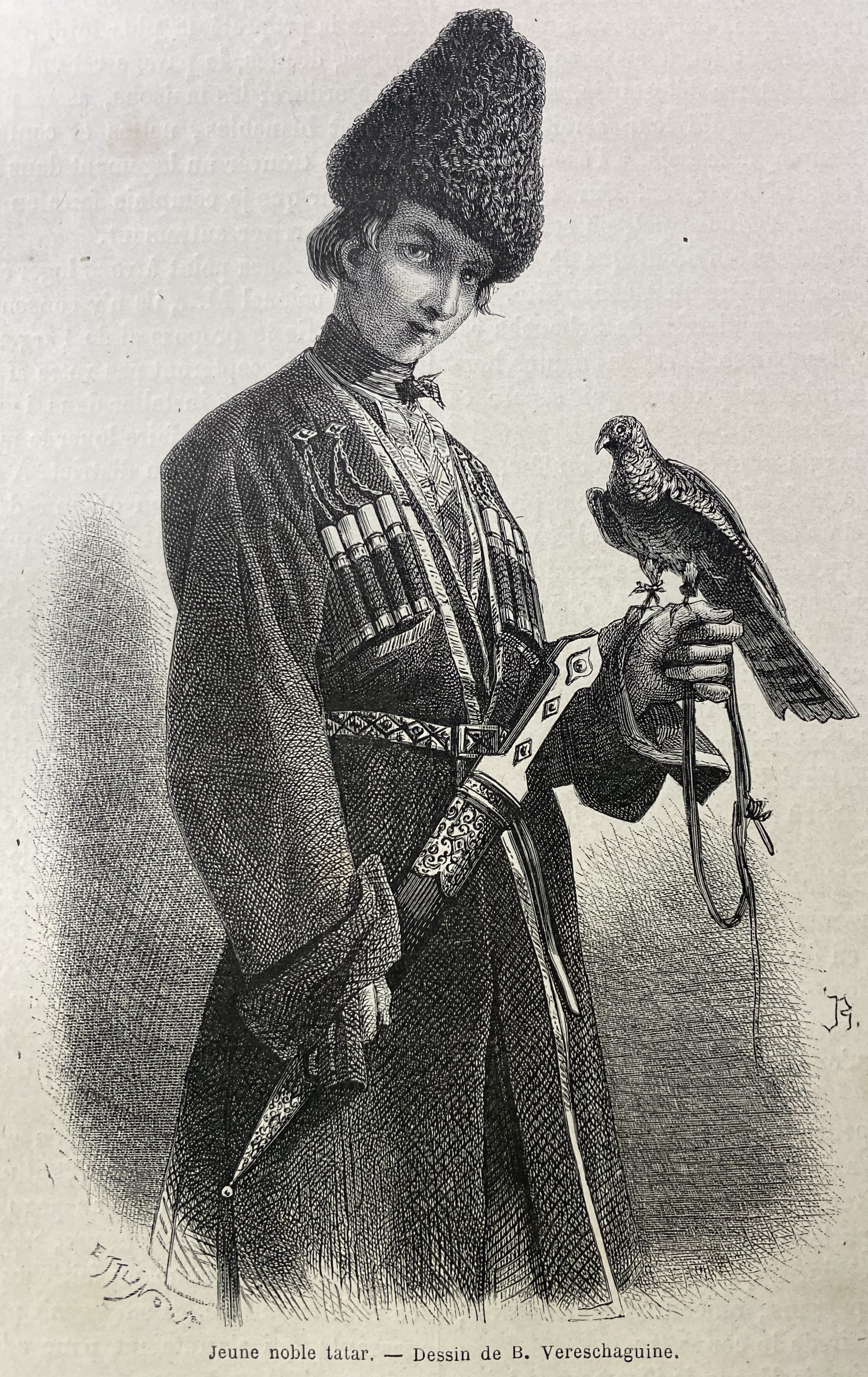
"Young noble Tatar", drawn by the Russian artist Vasily Vereshchagin in 1865 at Shusha

The Azerbaijani people have an identity that has been shaped by the interaction of many ethnic and cultural elements throughout history. With the arrival of the Seljuk Turks in the region in the 11th century, the Oghuz tribes settled in Azerbaijan and mingled with the Iranic-origin peoples and Caucasian indigenous communities living here. This process was a period in which the foundations of the Azerbaijani Turkic language were laid and Islamic culture became widespread.

During the Qara Qoyunlu and Aq Qoyunlu periods, Azerbaijani Turkish (known as "Turki" in contemporary sources) gradually emerged as a literary and poetic medium of expression, and Azerbaijani Turkic gradually began to differentiate from Anatolian Turkic. During this period, writing in Turkic became fashionable at court and among poets. The Qara Qoyunlu ruler Jahan Shah was known for his pen name "Haqiqi," while the Aq Qoyunlu ruler Sultan Ya'qub was known for writing Turkish poetry.

Historically, the name "Azerbaijan" referred to the region south of the Aras River, in present-day northwestern Iran. The historical name of the present-day Republic of Azerbaijan was Arran and Shirvan. Before its conquest by the Russian Empire, Shirvan was a province of an imperial structure that was entirely Iranian, in the same fashion as other provinces such as Lorestan and Khorasan. Before the 20th century, the Azerbaijanis barely constituted as an ethnic group, much less a nation. The people who lived in the present-day country of Azerbaijan identified as either Muslims of the ummah (community), or Turks, who shared a language family spread out throughout a considerable portion of Central Asia, or as Persians. Unlike the Armenians and the Georgians, they employed the Persian alphabet as they lacked their own.

The delayed emergence of Azerbaijani national identity has several causes. Persian culture dominated the area that would become modern-day Azerbaijan for the majority of its history, up until the 1820s. The region never formed a distinct, unified state before the Russians finished conquering it in 1828, and even when Iran ruled the area, the eastern part of the South Caucasus was composed of numerous feudal khanates. The ethnic diversity in many of these khanates posed another barrier to national unification.

At the end of the 19th century, there was still no widely accepted national identity in the area. Both historical Azerbaijan to the south of the Aras River and the Russian-ruled Baku and Elizavetpol governorates to the north were home to a majority of Turkic-speaking people, who were defined differently by opposing ideologies. The ones to the north of the Aras were known by different sources as "Tatar", "Turk", "Muslim" or "Persian". Only a few sources at the end of the 19th-century call them "Azerbaijani", a term which first started becoming popular after the fall of the Russian Empire in 1917. The Russian imperial government stated that "Azerbaijani Tatars were erroneously called Persians. They were Shiite by denomination and imitated Persians in many ways, but their language is Turkic-Tatar." In order to distinguish them from the other "Tatars" of the empire and the Persian speakers of Iran, the Russian Empire's official documents and numerous published works from the pre-1917 era also referred to them as "Tatar" or "Caucasian Tatars," "Azerbaijani Tatars," and even "Persian Tatars." This came about as a result of all Turkic-speakers being commonly referred in the Russian language as "Tatar." In Azerbaijani language publications, the expression "Azerbaijani nation" referring to those who were known as Tatars of the Caucasus first appeared in the newspaper Kashkul in 1880. However, the identity of the "Azerbaijani people" in today's sense was mainly shaped in the 20th century, during the Soviet Union. The Soviet administration officially defined the identity of "Azerbaijan" in the process of classifying ethnic identities and establishing national republics, and within this framework, a common language, history and culture policy was developed.

=== Formation ===
Much remained to be done before the peasantry became a nation, and for the locals, religion or regional identification came first. This was a time of ambiguity and debates about Azerbaijani identity. The Tiflis-based publicist, writer, and philosopher Mirza Fatali Akhundov (who is regarded as a nation-builder by both Azerbaijanis and Iranians), considered Iran to be his fatherland while simultaneously classifying his kinsmen as Turki. The influence of Azerbaijan's numerous and diverse pre-Russian conquerors, beginning with the Arab caliphate in the middle of the 7th-century and continuing with the Seljuk Empire, the Mongol Empire, the Ottoman Empire, and the Iranian dynasties, led to an identity problem for the Azerbaijanis. Their small group of intellectuals hence fluctuated between Iranian, Ottoman, Islamic, and pan-Turkic alignment. Only a small percentage favored an exclusively Azerbaijani identity, which was most strongly supported by Firidun bey Kocharli. The Himmät, a socialist movement centered on the ethnically diverse working class of Baku's oilfields, was also present. The future of Azerbaijan, according to the Himmät, lay not in ethnic nationalism but rather in the uniting of all the various national groups who called the region home, operating under the banner of a democratic revolution that would engulf the entire Russian Empire. In 1891, the idea of recognizing oneself as an "Azerbaijani Turk" was first popularized amongst the Caucasus Tatars in the periodical Kashkül. The articles printed in Kaspiy and Kashkül in 1891 are typically credited as being the earliest expressions of a cultural Azerbaijani identity.

The 1900s led to the increase Turkic national sentiments in present-day Azerbaijan as a result of three events in quick succession; the Russian Revolution in 1905 and the subsequent Armenian–Tatar massacres of 1905–1906; the Iranian Constitutional Revolution in 1905 and its failure; and the Young Turk Revolution in 1908, which installed Pan-Turks as the ruling party in the Ottoman Empire. In present-day Azerbaijan, Pan-Turks stressed their Turkic roots. Attempts were made to describe this newly discovered Turkicness in reference to the Ottoman Turks. The Turkic population of the Ottoman Empire and in present-day Azerbaijan were both identified by Ali bey Huseynzade in his magazine Füyuzat (1906) as descended from the Oghuz Turks, and he asserted that the differences between the two peoples were of minimal significance. He advocated for some sort of union with the Ottoman Empire. This Turkish movement was also supported by publications like Açıq Söz (1915–1918), which was edited by Mahammad Amin Rasulzade. However, the writers in Azärijilar and other thinkers like Jalal Mammad Quluzadä claimed that the Azerbaijani identity had to develop independently of the Ottomans in order to thrive after its recent "recovery" from Iranian dominance.

The Turkish ethnolinguistic identity was also opposed by some in Baku at that time. In order to help develop a Persian territorial identity in Baku, they published Azarbayjan, Joz-e la-yanfakk-e Iran ("Azerbaijan, an Inseparable Part of Iran"). A non-Persian speaker was easily able to fit into this all-Persian identity at this point because the Iranian identity was still defined by dynasty rule. In October 1917, the people in Baku were still not interested in referring to the region in the south Caucasus as "Azerbaijan". The local populace was frequently included under terms such as Türk milleti and Qafqaziya müsalman Xalqi ("the Muslim people of the Caucasus"). Even the name of the first Constituent Assembly, which was founded on 29 April 1917 in Baku, was "General Assembly of the Caucasian Muslims".

Iran was in the midst of deterioration and revolution when the formation of the Azerbaijani national identity was taking place, and therefore it did not provide an ideal role model or source of inspiration. Iran was perceived by some intellectuals in Baku as a "backward society" with a long history of "oriental despotism" and Shiite clericalism. The final decision was influenced by convenience as well. Nationalists in present-day Azerbaijan could not use Iran in 1918 since it was under the control of foreign forces. Iran's power in the Caucasus would not have been permitted, especially by Britain, which was aiding those opposing the Bolsheviks. Britain was also worried that Iran may ask for the restoration of the Caucasian regions it had lost to Russia. Iran wanted to make complaints at the Paris Peace Conference in 1919, particularly its lost Caucasus regions, but Britain forbade Iran from even going.

The linguistic differences with Iran was the deciding element in the decision of the Azerbaijanis, and thus pan-Turkism was chosen over pro-Iranianism.

=== Azerbaijan Democratic Republic (1918–1920) ===
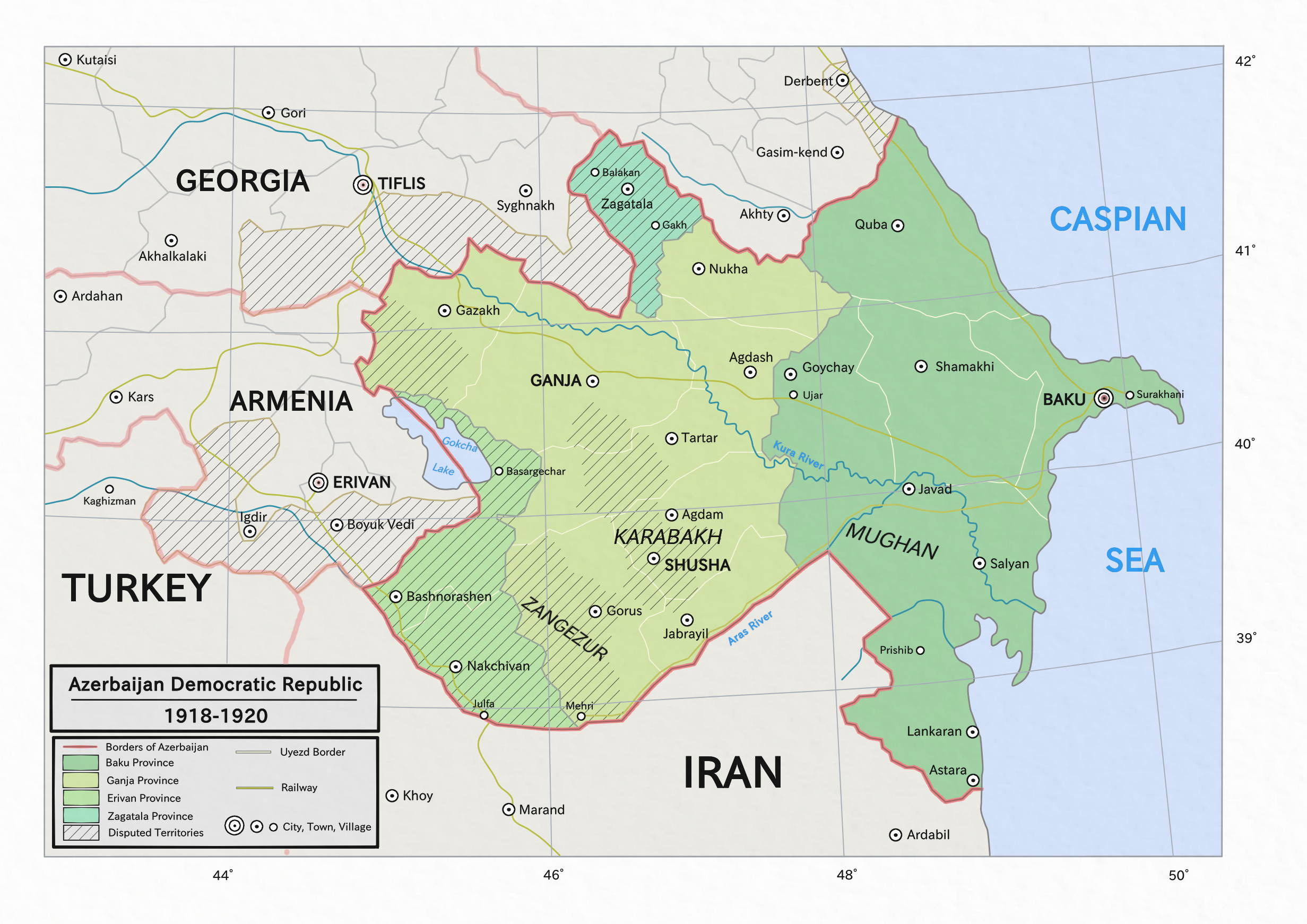
Map of the Azerbaijan Democratic Republic with territorial claims and disputed areas

On May 28, 1918, Mahammad Amin Rasulzade and a group of Azerbaijani nationalist elites proclaimed the formation of the Azerbaijan Democratic Republic (abbreviated as ADR), thus ending a century of Russian colonial rule. This marked the start of Azerbaijan as both state and nation. It was a pro-Turkish government that was established with the help of the Ottoman army.

As the word Tatar was seen as a Russian colonial concept, the leaders of Azerbaijan refused to identify as such. Instead, they referred to the Turkic-speaking Muslim inhabitants of the southeast Caucasus as Turkic. They were known as Türk and Azerbaijani Türk in their native language. Due to the fact that the majority of people continued to identify themselves by religion, Azerbaijani officials also regularly used "Muslim" to refer to the same group. Because the word "Azerbaijan" might also refer to Iranian Azerbaijan and imply a territorial claim, Iran expressed dissatisfaction when they chose that name for the nation. The phrase "Caucasian Azerbaijan" was thus used in the documents intended for international distribution by the Azerbaijani government to ease Iranian concerns.

Overall, the ADR's existence was brief, spanning from 28 May 1918 to 27 April 1920. The ADR was not in control of Baku until August 1918, and until August 1919, British troops were stationed in several areas of the country, keeping a partial eye on its actions. Though it only lasted from August 1919 to April 1920, its complete independence was nonetheless significant. The people of Azerbaijan were influenced by the ADR in shaping their nationalist aspirations both at that time and after. This was evident in the later creation of the later republics of Azerbaijan Soviet Socialist Republic and the present-day Republic of Azerbaijan.

=== Under the Soviet Union (1920–1991) ===
Location of the Azerbaijan Soviet Socialist Republic (red) within the Soviet Union

The majority of the people first adopted the Azerbaijani identity as a result of Soviet policy. Before the Soviet Union established its rule over Azerbaijan, there was no distinguishing Azerbaijani nationalism as a political and social force. Due to the fact that rural Turkic-speaking communities in the Caucasus typically associated themselves more with specific locations and local clans than with the entire Azerbaijan Soviet Socialist Republic, the new ethnonym "Azerbaijani" took a while to gain consensus and wide adoption.

Several myths about Azerbaijan's history and its links with Iran were created between the time the ADR was conquered by the Bolsheviks in 1920 and the period that its heritage reappeared as encouragement for the country's new nationalists in the 1980s. The development of Azerbaijan's post-Soviet identity has been substantially impacted by these myths.

One myth was that the Turks were colonized and subjugated by the Persians. According to Eldar Mamedov, this "flies in the face of historical reality. It was the various Turko-Mongol groups that invaded Iran several times, killed millions of Iranians, and ruled over them for several centuries. If any colonization, including linguistic change, was done, it was by Turks." It was the Soviet Union who initially popularized the idea of "Persian colonialism" after it was forced to withdraw its forces from the Iranian province of Azerbaijan in 1946 due to its failure to establish an independent republic there. Another myth was of a united Azerbaijan that was "divided by treacherous Persians" was also established. A southern and a northern Azerbaijan are not mentioned in historical accounts. The existence of two Azerbaijans is not mentioned in any historical or geographical writings in either the Russian Empire or rest of Europe.

According to a more recent revisionist theory, Russia and Iran plotted to split up Azerbaijan in the 19th century. Commenting on this, Mamedov states that "Considering that Iran fought two devastating wars with Russia (1803–1813 and 1824–1828), the idea of a Russo-Iranian conspiracy against Azerbaijan is totally absurd." The claim is repeated by the Azerbaijani nationalist poet Bakhtiyar Vahabzadeh in his poem Gülüstan. Today, the majority of Azerbaijani nationalists hold this opinion. As a result, Azerbaijan's post-Soviet national identity is strongly anti-Iranian and primarily Turkocentric. It has been built in various ways to oppose Iran as "the other," not just as a country but also as a culture and historical entity. Nowadays, being Azerbaijani means rejecting any ties to Iran.

==== Rise of the Popular Front of Azerbaijan ====
The political party known as the Popular Front of Azerbaijan (abbreviated as APF) accelerated the development of a Turkocentric and anti-Iranian national identity. It first appeared when the Soviet leader Mikhail Gorbachev was first implementing his political reforms (Perestroika). Its creation and development are a reflection of Moscow's shifting political climate. Gorbachev supported the establishment of pro-reform movements in the former Soviet Union's constituent nations during the early years of his reforms. Although there was a stronger nationalistic and pro-independence element in each of these local groupings, at first they were all in favor of change within the structure of the Soviet Union.

The goals of republican reform movements changed as Boris Yeltsin opposed Gorbachev's reforms, calling for more drastic measures and pushing for the Soviet Union's constituent republics to obtain "as much sovereignty as they can." As a result, the local political movements grew increasingly nationalist and pro-independence. This also applied to the APF. The movement shifted from being reformist to becoming nationalist. Zardusht Alizadeh, one of the movement's early founders, states in his memoirs, The End of the Second Republic, that a more strongly nationalistic element immediately undermined the APF's original pro-democracy and human rights-based program. Along with calling for deeper relations with Turkey and other Turkic peoples in Iran and Central Asia, the APF promoted Azerbaijan's Turkic identity. In an attempt to reshape Azerbaijan in the likeness of Turkey, it went further beyond Turkicness, trying to imitate the founder of the Republic of Turkey, Mustafa Kemal Atatürk. Thus, the old Turkicness gave way to Turkishness. Being Turkic was no longer enough; it was important to become Turkish, like the people of Turkey.

The ultranationalist and pan-Turkist faction won after an internal power struggle, leading to the APF adopting a firmly pro-Turkish nationalist stance. Abulfaz Elchibey, a former dissident from the Soviet Union, was elected as the chairman of the APF and surrounded himself with pan-Turkists who shared his views. At the expense of the moderates who supported democracy, events in the early 1990s reinforced nationalist tendencies and the impact of Elchibey's pan-Turkist supporters on the APF. Amongst these events was the Soviet attack on Baku in January 1990 (which became known as the Black January), allegedly launched to put an end to pogroms against its Armenian inhabitants—most of which had either fled or been massacred.

=== Republic of Azerbaijan (1991–present day) ===
The Soviet attack on Baku provided a much-needed respite for the struggling Azerbaijani Communist Party, even if it was a disgraced and despised political party. On 14 September 1991, the Azerbaijani Communist Party was dissolved by the First Secretary Ayaz Mutallibov, since he thought he could handle things alone. Another event that strengthened the APF and nationalist tendencies was a series of military setbacks in the Nagorno-Karabakh conflict, which included the ethnic cleansing of Azerbaijanis from the area; and the capture of Shusha in 1992.

The pan-Turkist zeal supported by the APF was slightly reduced after Heydar Aliyev returned to power in June 1993 and Elchibey resigned as president. Aliyev recognized that extreme Turkification measures in Azerbaijan may antagonize the country's non-Turkic ethnic minorities (including groups such as the Talysh and Lezgins) as well as its educated Russian speakers, some of them being ethnic Azerbaijanis. He was also aware of how much these actions infuriated Russia and Iran. Reducing the pan-Turkist discourse did not, however, mean weakening Turkism, which remains a cornerstone of Azerbaijan's post-Soviet national identity and one of its primary efforts to build the nation.

== Sources ==
- Ahmadi, Hamid (2016). "The Clash of Nationalisms: Iranian Response to Baku's Irredentism". In Kamrava, Mehran (ed.). The Great Game in West Asia: Iran, Turkey and the South Caucasus. Oxford University Press. pp. 102–140. ISBN 978-0190673604.
- Ahmadoghlu, Ramin (2020). "Secular nationalist revolution and the construction of the Azerbaijani identity, nation and state". Nations and Nationalism. 27 (2). Wiley: 548–565. doi:10.1111/nana.12682.
- Astourian, Stephan H. (2023). "Origins, Main Themes and Underlying Psychological Disposition of Azerbaijani Nationalism". In Dorfmann-Lazarev, Igor; Khatchadourian, Haroutioun (eds.). Monuments and Identities in the Caucasus Karabagh, Nakhichevan and Azerbaijan in Contemporary Geopolitical Conflict. Brill. pp. 206–236. ISBN 978-90-04-67738-8.
- Atabaki, Touraj (2001). "Recasting Oneself, Rejecting the Other: Pan-Turkism and Iranian Nationalism". In van Schendel, Willem; Zürcher, Erik J. (eds.). dentity Politics in Central Asia and the Muslim World: Nationalism, Ethnicity and Labour in the Twentieth Century. I.B. Tauris. pp. 65–84. ISBN 978-1860642616.
- Behrooz, Maziar (2023). Iran at War: Interactions with the Modern World and the Struggle with Imperial Russia. I.B. Tauris. ISBN 978-0-7556-3737-9.
- Bournoutian, George (2018). Armenia and Imperial Decline: The Yerevan Province, 1900–1914. Milton Park, Abingdon, Oxon: Routledge. ISBN 978-1-351-06260-2. OCLC 1037283914.
- Broers, Laurence (2019). Armenia and Azerbaijan: Anatomy of a Rivalry. Edinburgh University Press. ISBN 978-1-4744-5052-2.
- Dorfmann-Lazarev, Igor (2023). "Stalin's Legacy in the Post-Soviet Nations and the Genesis of Nationalist Extremism in Azerbaijan". In Dorfmann-Lazarev, Igor; Khatchadourian, Haroutioun (eds.). Monuments and Identities in the Caucasus Karabagh, Nakhichevan and Azerbaijan in Contemporary Geopolitical Conflict. Brill. pp. 237–305. ISBN 978-90-04-67738-8.
- Fowkes, B. (2002). Ethnicity and Ethnic Conflict in the Post-Communist World. Springer. ISBN 978-0-333-79256-8.
- Hunter, Shireen T. (2017). "Introduction". In Hunter, Shireen T. (ed.). The New Geopolitics of the South Caucasus: Prospects for Regional Cooperation and Conflict Resolution. Lexington Books. pp. ix–xxvii. ISBN 978-1498564960.
- Mamedov, Eldar (2017). "Azerbaijan Twenty-Five Years after Independence: Accomplishments and Shortcomings". In Hunter, Shireen T. (ed.). The New Geopolitics of the South Caucasus: Prospects for Regional Cooperation and Conflict Resolution. Lexington Books. pp. 27–64. ISBN 978-1498564960.
- Multiple authors (1987). "Azerbaijan". In Yarshater, Ehsan (ed.). Encyclopædia Iranica. Vol. III/2: Awāʾel al-maqālāt–Azerbaijan IV. London and New York: Routledge & Kegan Paul. pp. 205–257. ISBN 978-0-71009-114-7.
- Morozova, Irina (2005). "Contemporary Azerbaijani Historiography on the Problem of "Southern Azerbaijan" after World War II". Iran and the Caucasus. 9 (1): 85–120. doi:10.1163/1573384054068114.
- Rezvani, Babak (2015-01-27). Conflict and Peace in Central Eurasia. International Comparative Social Studies. Vol. 31. Brill. ISBN 978-90-04-27636-9.
- Suvari, Çakir Ceyhan (2012). "Turkey and Azerbaijan: On the Myth of Sharing the same Origin and Culture". Iran and the Caucasus. 16 (2): 247–256. doi:10.1163/1573384X-20120011.
- Yilmaz, Harun (2013). "The Soviet Union and the Construction of Azerbaijani National Identity in the 1930s". Iranian Studies. 46 (4): 511–533. doi:10.1080/00210862.2013.784521. S2CID 144322861.
- Yilmaz, Harun (2015). "A Family Quarrel: Azerbaijani Historians against Soviet Iranologists". Iranian Studies. 48 (5). Cambridge University Press: 769–783. doi:10.1080/00210862.2015.1058642. S2CID 142718875.
