= Kamran Talattof =

Persian scholar

Kamran Talattof (Persian: کامران تلطف) is the Elahé Omidyar Mir-Djalali Chair in Persian and Iranian studies at the University of Arizona.

His research focus is on gender, ideology, culture, and language, with an emphasis on literature (Modern and Classical); contemporary Islamic issues, Middle Eastern culture; and the Persian language. He has translated contemporary debates in Islam from Persian, Arabic, French, and Urdu into English.

In addition to co-authoring the textbook "Modern Persian: Spoken and Written", Kamran Talatoff is a coordinator of the University of Arizona's Online Persian Language Learning Resource Project.

== Published works ==
Talattof is the author of The Politics of Writing in Iran: A History of Modern Persian Literature; Modern Persian: Spoken and Written with D. Stilo and J. Clinton, He co-edited Essays on Nima Yushij: Animating Modernism in Persian Poetry with A. Karimi-Hakkak; The Poetry of Nizami Ganjavi: Knowledge, Love, and Rhetoric with J. Clinton; and Contemporary Debates in Islam: An Anthology of Modernist and Fundamentalist Thought with M. Moaddel. He is the co-translator of Women Without Men by Shahrnush Parsipur, with J. Sharlet and Touba and the Meaning of Night by Parsipur, with H. Houshmand.

His most recent book is Modernity, Sexuality, and Ideology in Iran: The Life and Legacy of a Popular Female Artist (Syracuse: Syracuse University Press, 2011).
