= Women Without Men (novella) =

1989 Iranian novella by Shahrnush Parsipur

- Author: Shahrnush Parsipur
- Original title: زنان بدون مردان
- Translator: Kamran Talattof, Jocelyn Sharlet (1998); Faridoun Farrokh (2011)
- Language: Persian
- Publisher: Intisharat-i Shirkat-i Kitab (Persian, 1989), Syracuse University Press (1998, Talattof & Sharlet); Feminist Press (2011, Farrokh); Penguin International Writers (2026, Farrokh)
- Publication date: 1989
- Publication place: Iran
- English publication date: 1998, 2011

Women Without Men (Persian: زنان بدون مردان, romanized: Zanān bedūn-e mardān) is a 1989 magical realist novella by Iranian author Shahrnush Parsipur. The novella follows the interconnected lives of five women in Tehran in the wake of the 1953 Iranian coup d'état, who all ultimately unite in a garden in Karaj.

Women Without Men has received positive reviews and been the subject of scholarly analysis with regards to its feminist themes and commentary on women's status and welfare in Iranian society. A film adaptation by the same name was released in 2009. Two translations of the book into English have been realized: one by Kamran Talattof and Jocelyn Sharlet, released in 1998, and another by Faridoun Farrokh, released initially in 2011, and again in 2026. Farrokh's translation was longlisted for the 2026 International Booker Prize.

== Background ==
Parsipur wrote the book in Paris in the summer of 1978. She submitted it to the Ministry of Culture and Islamic Guidance around 1986 or 1987, and the novel was published in 1989. The novella provoked controversy, with reviewers from newspapers in Iran, such as Kayhan and Islamic Republican, deeming it "anti-Islam". Shortly after the publication of Women Without Men, Parsipur was imprisoned, and the book was banned. The novel takes its title from Hemingway's 1927 short story collection Men Without Women.

== Synopsis ==
Mahdokht, a teacher, resigns from her position at a school after being asked on a date by a male coworker. After witnessing a 15-year-old servant, Fati, being raped by a man named Yadollah, she grows disgusted with Fati and calls her a slut. She wishes to be transformed into a tree so that she may forever remain a virgin. She decides to plant herself as a tree in her garden in Karaj.

Munis is a 38-year-old woman living with her older brother, 40-year-old Amir. Amir has full control over Munis, forbidding her, for example, from listening to the radio or leaving the house. Her friend, 28-year-old Faizeh, is in love with Amir. However, he does not love her back. She has an argument with Munis about the nature of virginity, as both of them are virgins. Munis falls to her death and wanders around Tehran as a ghost, returning after a month. Amir, angry at her for leaving the home without his permission, calls her a whore, beats her and murders her. Faizeh helps him bury her in the garden, but tries to blackmail him into marrying her. Instead he decides to marry an 18-year-old girl. Faizeh digs Munis up on the day of their marriage; Faizeh asks her forgiveness, and they both leave for the garden in Karaj. On the way to the garden, they are attacked and raped by a truck driver and his helper.

26-year-old Zarrinkolah has been a prostitute from a young age. One day, one of her customers appears without a head. For the rest of the day, her customers seem headless as well. Zarrinkolah tries to find a cure for her condition, and is advised to go to the garden in Karaj.

51-year-old Farrokhlaqa lives with her husband Golchehreh. He desires multiple wives and is verbally cruel to her. After pushing him and accidentally causing his death, Farrokhlaqa inherits his money. She buys the garden in Karaj, hoping to transform it into a literary salon. There, she meets the other women of the novel. The garden is almost empty of men, with the exception of the male gardener, whom Zarrinkolah marries. She gives birth to a lily, and with her milk nurtures the tree Mahdokht, causing the tree to turn into a mountain of seeds and be carried away by the river. The lily carries Zarrinkolah and her husband to heaven.

The other three women leave the garden and return to Tehran. Faizeh ultimately returns to Amir, Farrokhlaqa remarries and Munis, after travelling for seven years, becomes a teacher.

== Analysis ==
The work has been analyzed for its feminist themes and commentary on Iranian society. Kamran Talattof writes that Parsipur's work, in general, criticizes misogynist social conventions; comparing Women without Men to a previous Parsipur work, Touba and the Meaning of Night, he considers Women Without Men to be "even more radical" in terms of feminist themes. Nasrin Rahimieh offers a possible interpretation of the woman's search for an utopia, in the form of the garden, as "a corollary to the national attempt at self-determination." Hind Elhinnawy, in an article for The Conversation, writes that the women's journeys to the garden is their "refusal to live within a world that insists on defining them" and that the women together build a world rejecting patriarchal violence.

Leila Sadegh Beigi describes the novel as "a reaction to the Islamization of laws after the revolution" and comments on the use of sexist language as a tool used to deny women freedom.

According to Reshmi Mukherjee, Parsipur challenges the "stereotypical image of the Muslim woman as a docile subject" and represents her characters as active, not passive; she reads Makdokht's transformation into a tree as an advocation of women's rights to their bodies, and that Parsipur's emphasis on virginity in the narrative is to challenge notions of virginity and purity in Iranian society.

== Reception ==
Publishers Weekly commented that the novella was "charming but powerful". William L. Hanaway called the novella a "subtle and sophisticated work in the postmodern manner...a small masterpiece". Persis Karim praised the "thoughtful and careful translation" of Talattof and Sharlet and called the novella "provocative". Nasrin Rahimieh likewise praised Talattof and Sharlet for their "adherence to the minimalist syntax and ironic tone of the original." Rahimieh also commented that the novella encourages the reader to "grapple with deeply-rooted cultural attitudes that have led to women's subordination".

A second translation by Faridoun Farrokh was commissioned following Parsipur's disappointment that the initial translation failed to attract a wide audience. Leila Sadegh Beigi, in an article in the Journal of Middle East Women's Studies, considered Farrokh's translation to more accurately transmit the feminist views of the author, and criticized Talattof and Sharlet for softening the language and sanitizing the violence of the original. Farrokh's translation, republished in 2026 by Penguin Writers International, was longlisted for the 2026 International Booker Prize.

=== Film adaptation ===
A film adaptation by Shirin Neshat was released in 2009. The film stars Shabnam Tolouei, Pegah Ferydoni, Orsolya Tóth and Arita Shahrzad, while Parsipur plays a small role as the madam in Zarrinkolah's brothel.
