= Women Without Men =

Women Without Men may refer to:

- Women Without Men (1927 film), a 1927 German silent drama film
- Women Without Men (1956 film), a 1956 British drama film
- Women Without Men, a 1989 novella by Shahrnush Parsipur
  - Women Without Men (2009 film), a 2009 film set in Iran during the 1950s based on the novel
