= Siavoshi =

Siavoshi (Persian: شاه‌عنایتی) is a surname. Notable people with the surname include:

- Sussan Siavoshi (fl. from 1985), Iranian-American political scientist
- Tayebeh Siavoshi (born c. 1966), Iranian politician
