= Shiism and Constitutionalism in Iran =

1977 book by Haeri

Shīīsm and Constitutionalism in Iran
- Language: English
- Subject: Constitutionalism in Iran
- Publisher: Brill
- Publication date: 1977
- Media type: Print

Shī'īsm and Constitutionalism in Iran: A Study of the Role Played by the Persian Residents of Iraq in Iranian politics is a 1977 book by Abdul-Hadi Hairi. This book is originally the author's doctoral thesis at McGill University, first published in English in 1977 in Leiden. Then the author published it in Persian in Iran in the summer of 1979. This book is one of the most important researches about the thinking of scholars of Najaf and Qom during Iranian constitutional movement.

== Reception ==
The book was reviewed by R. M. Burrell in the Bulletin of the School of Oriental and African Studies and by Said Amir-Arjomand in the Iranian Studies.
