= Association for Iranian Studies =

U.S. non-profit academic organization

- Abbreviation: AIS
- Formation: 1967
- Founded at: United States
- Type: non-profit academic organization
- Legal status: Type B Corporation
- Headquarters: University of Toronto - St. George Campus
- Location: Toronto, Ontario, University of Toronto - St. George Campus
- Fields: Iranian studies
- President: Dr. Naghmeh Sohrabi
- Executive Director: Dr. Rivanne Sandler
- Affiliations: Iranian Studies journal
- Website: associationforiranianstudies.org
- Formerly called: International Society for Iranian Studies (ISIS)

The Association for Iranian Studies (AIS) (Persian: انجمن ایران پژوهی), formerly the International Society for Iranian Studies (ISIS), is a private, non-profit academic organization founded in 1967 in the United States, though it now counts upwards of 1,000 members around the world. The current president is Naghmeh Sohrabi, Brandeis University.

The AIS publishes a quarterly journal, Iranian Studies." Its editor is Sussan Siavoshi, from Trinity University. AIS is affiliated member of the international Middle East Studies Association (MESA).

== History ==
Association for Iranian Studies, Inc. (AIS), formerly The International Society for Iranian Studies, Inc. – previously The Society for Iranian Studies – was founded in 1967 as an academic society to support and promote the field of Iranian studies at the international level. Under its original name, the Society was incorporated in 1973 as a Type B Corporation under Section 201 of the Not-for-Profit Corporation Law of the State of New York.

== Organization ==
An elected council and an executive council run the affairs of the organization. The objectives of the Society are to promote high standards of scholarship in the field, to encourage the teaching of Iranian Studies at the graduate and undergraduate levels, and to encourage and facilitate scholarly exchange amongst its international membership. Association for Iranian Studies publishes Iranian Studies, a journal that continues to serve as the principal journal in the field.

In 2005 AIS organized the Committee for Intellectual and Academic Freedom (AIS-CAIF). The tax-exempt status of the Association permits donors in the United States to deduct contributions.

== Subjects ==
Iranian Studies is a peer-reviewed journal of history, literature, culture, and society, covering all regions of the globe with a Persian or Iranian legacy, especially Iran, Afghanistan, Central Asia, the Caucasus and northern India, as well as diaspora communities of Iranians in Europe and the United States.

== Publications ==
Iranian Studies is a quarterly peer-reviewed academic journal covering Iranian and Persianate history, literature, and society published by Routledge on behalf of the Association for Iranian Studies (International Society for Iranian Studies). It is published 6 times a year and was established in 1967. The editor-in-chief is Ali Gheissari (University of San Diego). The journal is abstracted and indexed in the MLA International Bibliography.

== Awards ==
=== Saidi-Sirjani Book Award ===
The Saidi-Sirjani Book Award is granted biennially by the Association for Iranian Studies on behalf of the Persian Heritage Foundation. Established in 1995, the purpose of the Award is to recognize and promote scholarship in the field of Iranian studies, as well as to honor the memory of Ali-Akbar Saidi-Sirjani (1931-1994), the noted Iranian historian, literary critic, and author, in appreciation for his scholarship, his courage, and his indefatigable struggle for freedom of expression.

List of Recipients
Year	Recipient	Publication
2016	Denise Aigle	The Mongol Empire between Myth and Reality: Studies in Anthropological History
2018	Thomas O. Flynn	The Western Christian Presence in the Russias and Qājār Persia

=== Lifetime achievement award ===
In 2006, under the leadership of President Janet Afary, AIS instituted two new awards for Life-Time Achievement in Iranian Studies. The first Life-Time Achievement in Iranian Studies Award for a Scholar Residing and Working Inside Iran was conferred on Professor Emeritus Iraj Afshar. Professor Ehsan Yarshater was chosen to receive the first Life-Time Achievement in Iranian Studies Award for a Scholar Residing and Working Outside of Iran. The chair of the 2018 Committee is Houchang Chehabi.

List of recipients
Year	Recipient	Institution
2006	Ehsan Yarshater Iraj Afshar	Encyclopaedia Iranica University of Tehran
2008	Mohammad-Reza Shafi'i-Kadkani Mansoureh Ettehadieh Nikki R. Keddie	Tehran University Tehran University University of California, Los Angeles

=== Ehsan Yarshater Book Award ===
The Ehsan Yarshater Book Award is granted biennially by the Association for Iranian Studies on behalf of the Persian Heritage Foundation. The purpose of this award is to advance the scholarship on Ancient Iranian Civilization and its cognate fields. Professor Ehsan Yarshater is an internationally recognized scholar who has made a major contribution to the field of Iranian Studies. The AIS Council designated Professor Yarshater an honorary member in 1999.

List of recipients
Year	Recipient	Institution
2010	Vladimir A. Livshits	Sogdian epigraphy of Central Asia and Semireche
2012	M. Rahim Shayegan University of California, Los Angeles	

=== Latifeh Yarshater Award ===
The Latifeh Yarshater Award was instituted by the Persian Heritage Foundation to honor the memory of Latifeh Yarshater and her lifelong dedication to the improvement of Iranian women's human rights. The purpose of the award is to encourage scholarship in Iranian studies focused on the condition of women in Persian speaking societies and to promote women's rights in these societies.

=== Mehrdad Mashayekhi Dissertation Award ===
The Mehrdad Mashayekhi Dissertation Award is presented biannually to the author of an exceptional Ph.D. dissertation dealing with the broad themes of politics and the public sphere in Iran, written in Persian or English. Dissertations written in other languages are accepted, if they are accompanied with condensed translation of chapters into English or Persian. This award is established by the Mehrdad Mashayekhi Foundation, in memory of his dedication to the cause of democracy and social justice in Iran.

== Name controversy ==
As the Society for Iranian Studies attracted more and more members from outside North America, it was decided to emphasize its transnational vocation by adding word "International" to the title. The membership agreed to this change, and in 2003 the Society for Iranian Studies became The International Society for Iranian Studies, along with the acronym ISIS.

By 2016, however "ISIS" no longer brought to mind an Egyptian goddess but rather a terrorist organization, the Islamic State of Iraq and Syria. In the Vienna 2016 Biennial conference, it was decided to change the name of the organization, which has been Association for Iranian Studies ever since.

== Former presidents ==
The following persons have been presidents of the association:

- 2021-22 Naghmeh Sohrabi
- 2019-20 Camron Michael Amin
- 2017-18 Touraj Daryaee
- 2015-16 Touraj Atabaki
- 2013-14 Mehrzad Boroujerdi
- 2011-12 Houchang Chehabi
- 2009-10 Mohammad Tavakoli-Targhi
- 2007-08 Nasrin Rahimieh
- 2005-06 Janet Afary
- 2004 Ahmad Karimi-Hakkak
- 2003 Shahrough Akhavi
- 2002 Richard N. Frye
- 2001 Ahmad Ashraf
- 2000 William L. Hanaway
- 1999 Farhad Kazemi
- 1998 Ali Banuazizi
- 1997 Ehsan Yarshater

== See also ==
- Iranian studies
- Iranian Studies journal
- Ehsan Yarshater
- Encyclopaedia Iranica
- Middle East Studies Association of North America
- Iranology Foundation
