= Farhad Kazemi (academic) =

Iranian-American political scientist

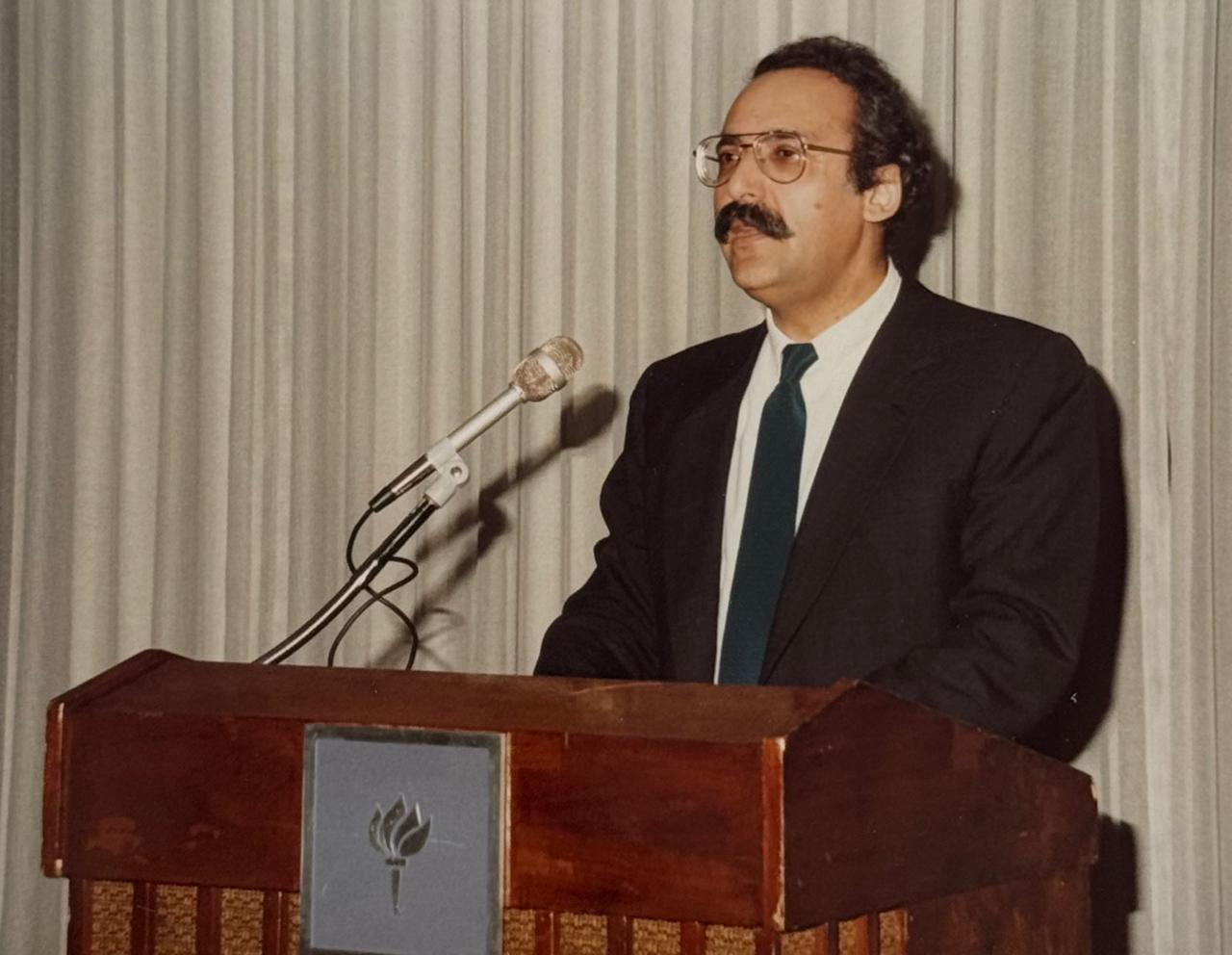
- Citizenship: American
- Known for: Iranian Revolution in Perspective (1980); Poverty and Revolution in Iran (1980); Former president of Middle East Studies Association and Association for Iranian Studies.

Academic background
- Education: University of Michigan (Ph.D); George Washington University (MA); Harvard University (MA in Middle Eastern Studies); Colgate University (BA)

Academic work
- Discipline: Middle Eastern Studies political science Iranian studies
- Institutions: New York University

Farhad Kazemi is an Iranian-American political scientist and professor emeritus of Politics and Middle Eastern Studies at New York University (NYU). He is known for his research on political development, urbanization, civil society, and gender in the Islamic Republic of Iran. He has published on Iran and broader Middle Eastern political issues, and has held academic and administrative positions during his four-decade career. He is also the former president of Middle East Studies Association and Association for Iranian Studies.

== Education ==
Kazemi received his Bachelor of Arts in political science from Colgate University in 1964. He earned a Master of Arts in Political Science from George Washington University in 1966, followed by a second M.A. in Regional Studies–Middle East from Harvard University in 1968. He completed his Ph.D. in political science at the University of Michigan in 1973.

== Career ==
Farhad Kazemi spent four decades at New York University (NYU), where he played a central role in the development of both the Department of Politics and Middle Eastern Studies. He began his tenure in 1971 and eventually rose through the academic ranks, becoming a full professor in 1988. In 1996, he received a joint appointment in the Departments of Politics and Middle Eastern and Islamic Studies. Upon his retirement in 2011, he was named professor emeritus.

Over the course of his academic career, Kazemi held multiple leadership roles at NYU. He served as chair of the Department of Politics during three separate terms, was director of the Hagop Kevorkian Center for Near Eastern Studies on two occasions, and acted as interim dean of the Graduate School of Arts and Science. From 1999 to 2003, he served as vice provost for global affairs, overseeing NYU's international academic initiatives.

Kazemi also held visiting academic appointments at several institutions internationally. These included St. Antony's College at the University of Oxford, Moshe Dayan Center for Middle Eastern and African Studies at Tel Aviv University, Princeton University, the University of Pennsylvania, and NYU's campus in Prague.

He has served as president of both the Middle East Studies Association of North America (MESA) and the Society for Iranian Studies (cofounder). He is a former editor of the journal Iranian Studies, served as a Trustee of the Encyclopædia Iranica, and was a member of several academic and policy organizations, including the Council on Foreign Relations. Kazemi also was an active member of the Board of Trustees of The American University in Cairo (AUC).

Kazemi received research grants and fellowships from the Ford Foundation, Rockefeller Foundation, U.S. Department of State, U.S. Department of Education, Social Science Research Council, and several academic and cultural institutions. His research has covered topics such as political participation, urbanization, civil society, and cultural change in the Middle East.

Kazemi was a member of the 13-member U.S. Advisory Group on Public Diplomacy for the Arab and Muslim World, a congressional commission formed in the early 2000s. The group's 2003 report concluded that animosity toward the United States in Muslim-majority countries had reached “unprecedented levels” and offered recommendations to improve America's image, including increased investment in public broadcasting and education initiatives.

He has also participated in State Department–sponsored public diplomacy tours and lectures across the Middle East, Europe, and East Asia, particularly in the wake of the September 11 attacks. He also was the coconvener of annual academia-intelligence conferences for which he was given an award. Kazemi has served as a consultant to the White House (President Jimmy Carter), the State Department (Secretary Madeleine Albright) and the Defense Department. He has been interviewed by various media outlets on current affairs (The New York Times, Washington Post and PBS).

== Research and scholarship ==
Kazemi's research has focused on the political sociology of the Middle East, especially Iran. His 1980 book Poverty and Revolution in Iran examined the political consciousness of Tehran's urban poor during the 1979 Iranian Revolution, arguing that migrants became politically mobilized through revolutionary slogans rather than integration into moderate political movements.

He also co-edited Iranian Revolution in Perspective (1980) and A Way Prepared: Essays on Islamic Culture in Honor of Richard Ettinghausen (1988, with R.D. McChesney). His work has also addressed themes of civil society, authoritarianism, and gender relations in post-revolutionary Iran.

== Views and opinions ==
Kazemi has expressed concern over U.S. foreign policy in the Middle East, particularly during the George W. Bush administration. In a 2004 interview, he described himself as “never so discouraged about the Middle East,” criticizing what he saw as the collapse of American credibility in the region due to the administration's military actions in Iraq and its close alignment with Israeli policy. He argued that the U.S.-Israel alliance and mutual interests have contributed to widespread animosity towards the United States.

Kazemi has also written on the shifting status of women in post-revolutionary Iran. He described women as “the real harbinger of change” and pointed to the rise of organized Muslim women's groups, the impact of the Iran-Iraq War, and societal evolution as forces compelling greater inclusion of women in public life. He noted that the Islamic Republic adopted an ideology that subordinated women and, despite some limited female representation in government as well as minor changes to family law, gender equality has not visibly progressed.

== Selected publications ==
=== Books ===
- Kazemi, Farhad; Waterbury, John, eds. (1991). Peasants and politics in the modern Middle East. Miami : Gainesville, Fla: Florida International University Press; Distributed by University Presses of Florida. ISBN 978-0-8130-1102-8.
- Kazemi, Farhad (1980). Poverty and revolution in Iran: the migrant poor, urban marginality and politics. New York: New York Univ. Press. ISBN 978-0-8147-4576-2.
- Kazemi, Farhad; Winder, Richard Bayly; McChesney, R. D., eds. (1988). A way prepared: essays on Islamic culture in honor of Richard Bayly Winder. New York: New York University Press. ISBN 978-0-8147-4591-5.
- Kazemi, Farhad; Lamote, L.; Johnson, S. E.; Clawson, P.; Hashim, A.; Hannah, J.; Eisenstadt, M.; Chubin, S. (2012). Iran's strategic intentions and capabilities. CreateSpace Independent Publishing Platform. ISBN 978-1-4782-0032-1.
