= Mohamad Tavakoli-Targhi =

Canadian professor, program director (born 1957)

- محمد توكلي طرقي
- Born: 1957 (age 68–69); Tehran, Iran
- Other names: Muḥammad Tavakkulī Ṭarqī, Mohamad Tavakoli
- Occupations: Scholar, editor, author, professor, program director
- Known for: Iranian Studies, Middle Eastern history, Orientalism, Gender Studies

Academic background
- Education: University of Iowa, University of Chicago (PhD)
- Thesis: The Formation of Two Revolutionary Discourses in Modern Iran: The Constitutional Revolution of 1905-1909 and the Islamic Revolution of 1978-1979 (1988)

Mohamad Tavakoli-Targhi (Persian: محمد توکلی طرقی; born 1957) is an Iranian-born Canadian scholar, editor, author, professor, and program director. He is a professor of History and Near and Middle Eastern Civilizations, and he serves as the Director of Elahé Omidyar Mir-Djalali Institute of Iranian Studies at the University of Toronto Mississauga. Tavakoli-Targhi's areas of research include Iranian Studies, Middle Eastern history, Gender Studies, modernity, nationalism, Orientalism, and occidentalism.

== Biography ==
Mohamad Tavakoli-Targhi was born in 1957 in Tehran, Iran. He attended the University of Iowa, and received a BA degree (1980) in political science and an MA degree (1981) in history; and has a PhD (1988) in history from the University of Chicago.

He previously taught history courses at the Illinois State University from 1989 to 2003. He moved to the University of Toronto in 2004, where he is the first director of the Elahé Omidyar Mir-Djalali Institute of Iranian Studies. Starting in 2022, a multi-year research partnership was formed between the Encyclopædia Iranica and the University of Toronto, under Tavakoli-Targhi's leadership.

Tavakoli-Targhi has served as an editor including at the academic journal, Comparative Studies of South Asia, Africa and the Middle East from 2001 until 2012; and at Iran Nameh from 2011 until 2015. He was previously served as the president of the International Society for Iranian Studies in 2009 to 2010.

== Publications ==
=== Books ===
- Tavakoli-Targhi, Mohamad (1988). The Formation of Two Revolutionary Discourses in Modern Iran: The Constitutional Revolution of 1905-1909 and the Islamic Revolution of 1978-1979 (dissertation). University of Chicago, Department of History.
- Tavakoli-Targhi, Mohamad (1991). The Exotic Europeans and the Reconstruction of Femininity in Iran. Middle East Studies Association of North America.
- Tavakoli-Targhi, M. (2001). Refashioning Iran: Orientalism, Occidentalism and Historiography. St Antony's Series. Palgrave. ISBN 9781403918413.

=== Articles and chapters ===
- Tavakoli-Targhi, Mohamad; Smith, Joan; Mazumdar, Sucheta; Tress, Madeleine (1994). Moghadam, Valentine M. (ed.). Identity Politics And Women: Cultural Reassertions And Feminisms In International Perspective. World Institute for Development Economics Research. Avalon Publishing. ISBN 9780813386928.
- Hashemi, Nader; Lotfalian, Mazyar; Ringer, Monica M.; Sadri, Ahmad; Siavoshi, Sussan; Tavakoli-Targhi, Mohamad; Tehranian, Majid; Vahdat, Farzin (2004). "The Homeless Texts of Persianate Modernity". In Jahanbegloo, Ramin (ed.). Iran: Between Tradition and Modernity. Global Encounters: Studies in Comparative Political Theory. Lanham, MD: Lexington Books. pp. 129–158. ISBN 9780739105306.
- Tavakoli-Targhi, Mohamad (2008). "Anti-Baha'ism and Islamism in Iran". In Brookshaw, Dominic Parviz; Fazel, Seena B. (eds.). The Baha'is of Iran: Socio-historical studies. New York City, NY: Routledge. ISBN 978-0-203-00280-3.
