= Nasrin Rahimieh =

- Born: 1958 (age 67–68); Bandar-e Anzali, Iran
- Education: Dalhousie University, University of Alberta
- Known for: Literary critic, editor, educator

Nasrin Rahimieh (born 1958) is an Iranian-born American literary critic, editor, and educator. Rahimieh is the Howard Baskerville Professor of Humanities in the Department of Comparative Literature and the Director of the Humanities Core program at the University of California, Irvine (UCI).

== Early life and education ==
Nasrin Rahimieh was born in 1958 in Bandar-e Anzali, Pahlavi Iran (now Iran). Her early education was primarily in Bandar-e Anzali, with the exception of her senior year of high school spent as an exchange student in New London, Connecticut.

She attended college classes in Switzerland, before moving to Canada. She has a B.A. degree in French and German, and M.A. degree in German literature from Dalhousie University in Canada; and a Ph.D. (1988) in comparative literature from the University of Alberta in Canada. She is interested in research areas including Iranian cinema, Iranian diaspora, women's writing and modern Persian literature.

== Career ==
After Rahimeh immigrated to Canada, she began her career as professor in Alberta teaching at the University of Alberta, and at McMaster University. At McMaster's she served as the Dean of Humanities. Rahimieh is the Howard Baskerville Professor of Humanities in the Department of Comparative Literature and the Director of the Humanities Core program at UCI. She previously served as the Maseeh Chair and Director of Samuel Jordan Center for Persian Studies and Culture at UCI.

She is a past-President of the International Society for Iranian Studies, Middle East Studies Association of North America, and the Canadian Comparative Literature Association.

In 1990, she published the notable book Oriental Responses to the West: Comparative Essays in Select Writers from the Muslim World (1990). Her articles have appeared in scholarly publications including Iranian Studies, and Comparative Literature Studies.

== Publications ==
=== Books ===
- Forugh Farrokhzad: Iconic Woman and Feminine Pioneer of New Persian Poetry, co-edited with Dominic Parzviz Brookshaw, London: I.B. Tauris, 2010, 236 pp
- Co-editor, special issue of Radical History Review, The Iranian Revolution Turns Thirty, 105 (Fall 2009), 187 pp
- Translation from Persian into English of the novel The Virgin of Solitude, by Taghi Modarressi, Syracuse: Syracuse University Press, 2008, 384 pp
- Co-editor, special issue of Multi-Ethnic Literature of the United States, Iranian American Literature, 33.2 (2008), 208 pp
- Missing Persians: Discovering Voices in Iranian Cultural Heritage, Syracuse: Syracuse University Press, 2001, 208 pp
- Oriental Responses to the West: Comparative Essays in Select Writers from the Muslim World, Leiden: E. J. Brill, 1990, 124 pp

=== Articles and chapters ===
- “Reflections of the Cold War in Modern Persian Literature, 1945-1979,” in Global Cold War Literature: Western, Eastern and Postcolonial Perspectives, ed. Andrew Hammond, New York: Routledge, 2012, 87-99.
- “Persian Incursions: The Transnational Dynamics of Persian Literature,” in A Companion to Comparative Literature, eds. Ali Behdad and Dominic Thomas, Oxford: Wiley-Blackwell, 2011, 296-311.
- “Capturing the Abject of the Nation in The House is Black,” in Forugh Farrokhzad, Poet of Modern Iran: Iconic Woman and Feminine Pioneer of New Persian Poetry, eds. Dominic P. Brookshaw and N Rahimieh, London: I B Tauris, 2010, 125-137.
- “Divorce Seen through Women's Cinematic Lens,” Iranian Studies 42:1 (2009): 97-112.
- “Hedayat’s Translations of Kafka and the Logic of Iranian Modernity” in Sadeq Hedayat: His Work and His Wondrous World, ed. Homa Katouzian. London: Routledge, 2008: 124-135.
- “Border Crossing,” Comparative Studies of South Asia, Africa and the Middle East 27.2 (2007): 225-232.
- “Manifestations of Diversity and Alterity in the Persian Literary Idiom,” in Critical Encounters: Essays on Persian Literature and Culture in Honor of Peter J. Chelkowski, eds. Mohamad Mehdi Khorrami and M. R. Ghanoonparvar, Costa Mesa: Mazda, 2007: 21-35.
- “Overcoming the Orientalist Legacy of Iranian Modernity,” Thamyris/ Intersecting No. 10 (2003): 147-63.
- “Capturing Cultural Transformation on Film: Makhmalbaf’s A Moment of Innocence,” Edebiyat 12 (2001): 195-214
- “Refocusing Alloula's Gaze: A Feminist Reading of The Colonial Harem,” in Atlantic Cross-Currents: Transatlantiques, eds. Susan Z. Andrade, Eileen Julien, Micheline Rice-Maximin, and Aliko Songolo, Trenton: Africa World Press, 2001: 91-100.
- “Framing Iran: A Contrapuntal Reading of Two Cinematic Representations of Post Revolutionary Iran,” Edebiyat 9 (1998): 249-275
- “Iranian-American Literature,” in New Immigrant Literatures of the United States: A Sourcebook, ed. Alpana Sharma Knippling, Westport, Connecticut: Greenwood Press, 1996: 109-124

== See also ==
- Touraj Daryaee
