= Robert E. Hunter =

American civil servant (1940–2026)

17th United States Ambassador to NATO
- In office 1993–1998
- President: Bill Clinton
- Preceded by: Reginald Bartholomew
- Succeeded by: Alexander Vershbow

Personal details
- Born: Robert Edwards Hunter; 1940 Cambridge, Massachusetts, U.S.
- Died: January 20, 2026 (aged 85)
- Spouse: Shireen Hunter
- Education: Wesleyan University (BA); London School of Economics (PhD)

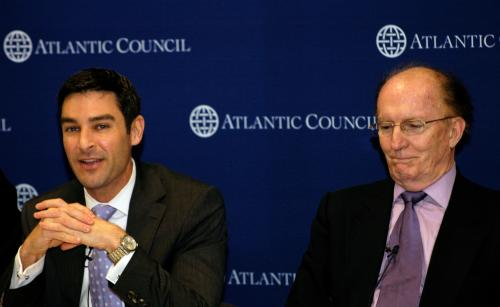
Damon Wilson and Ambassador Robert E. Hunter

Robert Edwards Hunter (May 1, 1940 – January 20, 2026) was an American government employee and foreign policy expert who was United States ambassador to NATO during the Clinton administration.

== Early life and education ==
Hunter was born in Cambridge, Massachusetts, in 1940. He earned a B.A. from Wesleyan University, graduating in 1962 with honors and Phi Beta Kappa. Hunter earned a Doctor of Philosophy in international relations from the London School of Economics in 1969 as a Fulbright Scholar.

== Career ==
During the Clinton administration, Hunter was United States Ambassador to NATO (1993–1998), where he was principal architect and negotiator of the post-Cold War "new NATO" and of the NATO airstrike decisions that ended the Bosnian War.

Throughout the administration of President Jimmy Carter, Hunter was the senior-most official on West European Affairs (1977–1979) and then Middle East Affairs (1979–1981) on the National Security Council staff. He was the first foreign policy advisor to Senator Edward M. Kennedy (1973–1977). He served on the White House staff, focusing on education, under President Lyndon B. Johnson (1964–1965). He was an administrative management intern at the U.S. Navy's Polaris Project, both in Washington and the British Admiralty.

Hunter was the author of articles and a number of books. Until July 2018, Hunter was a Senior Fellow at the Center for Transatlantic Relations at the Paul H. Nitze School of Advanced International Studies. He was a member of the Secretary of State's International Security Advisory Board from 2011 to 2017 (when it was dissolved). He was Director of the Center for Transatlantic Security Studies at the National Defense University from 2010 to 2012, and Senior Advisor at the RAND Corporation from 1998 to 2010.

== Personal life and death ==
Hunter was married to Shireen Hunter (née Tahmasseb). He died on January 20, 2026, at the age of 85.

=== Bibliography ===
- Security in Europe, Indiana University Press, 1972 (ISBN 9780253178657, OCLC 570116927)
- Presidential Control of Foreign Policy: Management or Mishap, Center for Strategic and International Studies, 1982 (ISBN 9780275915377, OCLC 8347438)
- The European Security and Defense Policy: NATO's Companion – or Competitor?, RAND, 2002
- Building a Successful Palestinian State: Security (with Seth Jones), RAND, 2006
- Building Security in the Persian Gulf, RAND, 2010.
