= William L. Hanaway =

American scholar and professor (1929–2018)

- Born: 1929
- Died: 2018 (aged 88–89)
- Spouse: Lorraine Kure (m. 1959)

William L. Hanaway (1929-2018) was an American scholar and professor of Asian and Middle Eastern Studies at the University of Pennsylvania. He was a president of the Association for Iranian Studies (2000). He was also a member of the Editorial Board of A History of Persian Literature and a consultant and contributor to the Encyclopœdia Iranica.

== Bibliography ==
- Literacy in the Persianate World: Writing and the Social Order, 2012
- Reading Nastaliq: Persian and Urdu Hands from 1500 to the Present (English, Persian and Urdu Edition), 2007
- Studies in Pakistani Popular Culture, 1996

== Awards ==
- Research Foundation Awards for “Analytical Description of the Tashkent Dialect of Uzbek” in 1992
