= Sussan Siavoshi =

Iranian-American political scientist

- Citizenship: Iranian-American
- Education: Ohio State University (PhD), Pahlavi University (BA)
- Scientific career
- Fields: international affairs, political science
- Institutions: Trinity University
- Thesis: The failure of the liberal nationalist movement in Iran, 1949-1979 : an analysis of structural constraints and political choices (1985)
- Academic advisors: R. William Liddle; Richard Cottam; Goldie Shabad; Richard K. Herrmann

Sussan Siavoshi is an Iranian-American political scientist and the Una Chapman Cox Distinguished Professor of International Affairs, Political Science at Trinity University. She is a former editor-in-chief of the journal Iranian Studies. She is known for her works on contemporary history of Iran.

== Books ==
- Montazeri: The Life and Thought of Iran's Revolutionary Ayatollah, Cambridge University Press, 2017
- Liberal Nationalism In Iran: The Failure Of A Movement, Westview Press, 1990
