= Touba and the Meaning of Night =

1989 novel by Shahrnush Parsipur

- First edition (Persian)
- Author: Shahrnush Parsipur
- Original title: طوبی و معنای شب
- Translator: Kamran Talattof; Havva Houshmand
- Language: Persian
- Set in: Iran
- Publisher: Intishārāt-i Ispark (Iran), Feminist Press (US)
- Publication date: 1989
- Publication place: Iran
- English publication date: 2006
- Media type: Print
- Pages: 367 pp
- ISBN: 978-1-5586-1519-9
- OCLC: 62878277
- Dewey Decimal: 891.5533
- LC Class: PK6561.P247

Touba and the Meaning of Night (Persian: طوبی و معنای شب) is a novel written by the Iranian novelist, Shahrnush Parsipur and originally published in Iran in 1989. Written after the author had spent four years and seven months in prison, it is Parsipur's second novel and is a fictional account of a woman, Touba, living through the rapidly changing political environment of 20th century Iran. Like other works of Shahrnush Parsipur, Touba and the Meaning of Night is considered by most to be a feminist work. Also, like Parsipur's other work, Touba and the Meaning of Night remains banned in Iran.

== Plot summary ==
Spanning eighty years, the novel follows the life of Touba, a young woman educated by her father in a time when few women received education. After her father passes away, Touba proposes to and marries a 52-year-old man. Initiated in desperation, the marriage causes Touba to fall into depression and eventually ends in a divorce. Touba later remarries a Prince of the Qajar dynasty. Though her second marriage starts happily, it also ends in divorce when the Prince takes a second wife. After the divorce, Touba is left to raise their daughter on the dwindling allowance afforded by her former husband's diminishing dynasty. To compensate, Touba weaves rugs.
