= Anna Krasnowolska =

Polish Iranologist

Anna Maria Krasnowolska
- Born: 1949 (age 76–77); Kraków
- Scientific career
- Fields: Iranology

Anna Maria Krasnowolska (born 1949 in Kraków) is a Polish Iranologist.

Krasnowolska was head of the Department of Iranian Studies at the Jagiellonian University Institute of Oriental Studies from 2000 until 2017. She is a translator of Persian literature into Polish, and Polish literature to Persian. In February 2019, Krasnowolska was awarded the Farabi International Award in the Outstanding World Iranianist category.
