= Azarbayjan, Joz-e la-yanfakk-e Iran =

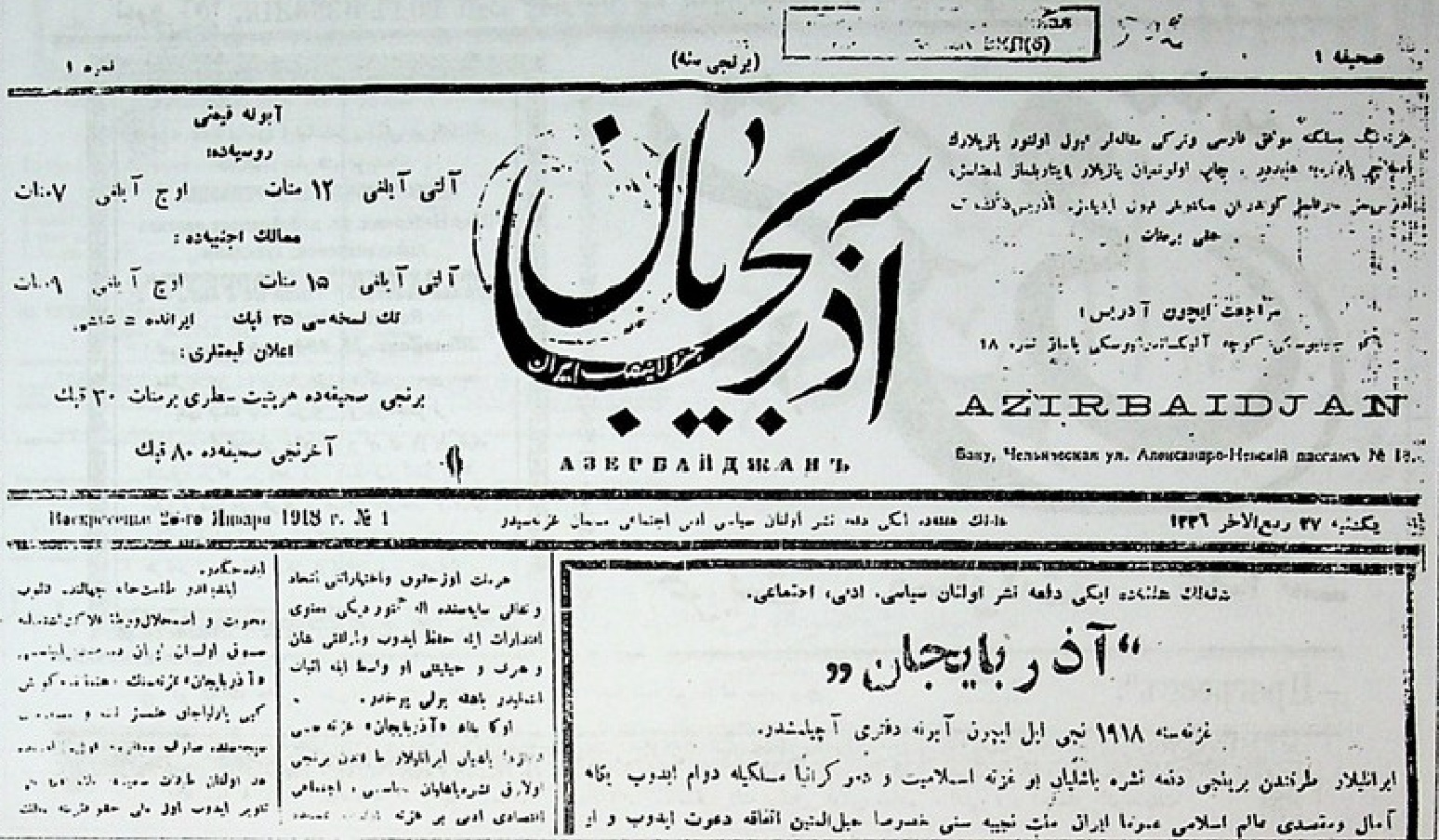
- A newspaper of the Azarbayjan, Joz-e la-yanfakk-e Iran
- Editor: Mirza Aliqoli
- Founded: 10 February 1918
- Ceased publication: May 1918
- City: Baku

Azarbayjan, Joz-e la-yanfakk-e Iran ("Azerbaijan, an Inseparable Part of Iran") was a bilingual newspaper published in Baku by the local Committee of the Democrat Party of Qajar Iran. It was published on 10 February 1918 as a response to the viewpoint expressed in the Açiq Söz newspaper by the Musavat party, which they saw as an attempt by pan-Turkists to undermine the territorial integrity and sovereignty of Iran. Recruited from the Iranian Azerbaijani population in Baku and its neighbouring areas, the Democrat Party's Baku Committee was established by Mohammad Khan Tarbiyat in 1914. The editor of the newspaper was Mirza Aliqoli.

The title of its publications read "Azarbayjan" in large characters, with "Joz-e la-yanfakk-e Iran" made much smaller and put inside the "n" of that word. The local political activist Salamullah Javid later admitted that "the decision to publish the newspaper was taken by the Democrats at the local level and was a direct response to irredentist propaganda initiated by Açiq Söz."

The newspaper stated that its goals included "displaying the country’s glorious past and its historical continuity" and "hindering any attempt to diminish the national consciousness of Iranians" in addition to advocating for political reform and change in Iran. The magazines often alluded to "the many centuries during which Azerbaijan governed all of Iran" while promoting the virtues of Azerbaijan and emphasizing its "key position in Iranian history". The newspaper stated that it was the responsibility of Azerbaijanis to defend Iran's "national pride" and "territorial integrity" by facing hostile "intruders", citing the Azerbaijan province's strategic front-line location. Despite not naming these "intruders", the newspaper stated that "their intention has always been to undermine Iran's territorial integrity and political sovereignty." Furthermore, it sought to promote Azerbaijanis as the primary protectors of Iran by portraying them as the principal leaders of the Iranian Constitutional Revolution.

The newspaper carried on publishing even after Bolsheviks briefly occupied Baku and established the Baku Commune. Nevertheless, when the Musavat party recovered their authority and established the Azerbaijan Democratic Republic in May 1918, the newspaper was compelled to close. The new newspaper Azerbayjan was later started by the Musavat party in September 1918, showing their strong loyalty to the name they had given their new state by naming their newspaper after the Azarbayjan, Joz-e la-yanfakk-e Iran.

== Sources ==
- Atabaki, Touraj (2006). Iran and the First World War: Battleground of the Great Powers. I.B.Tauris. ISBN 978-1860649646.
