= Shahrnush Parsipur =

Iranian writer and translator (1946–2026)

- شهرنوش پارسی‌پور
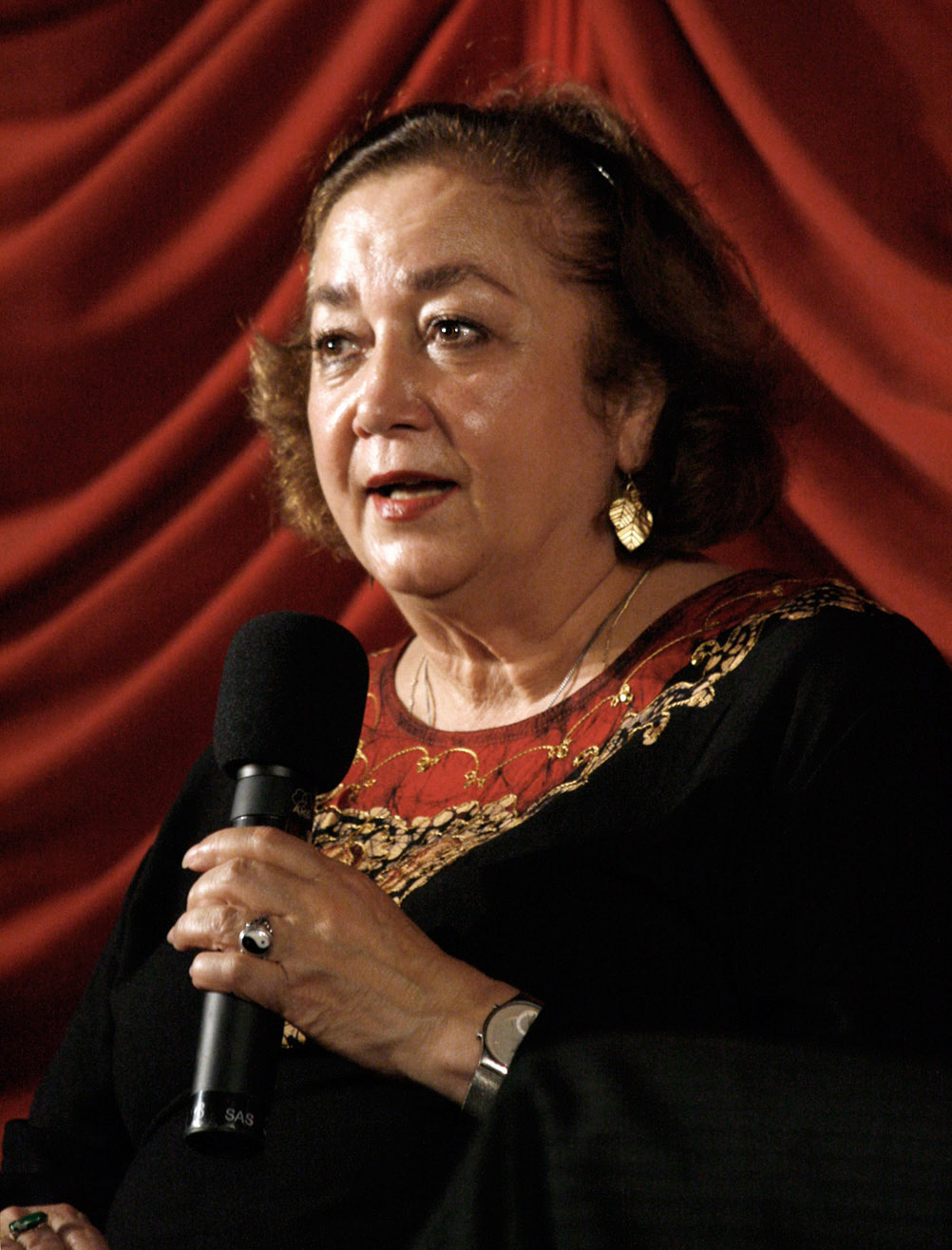
- Parsipur in 2010
- Born: Shahrnush Parsipur; 17 February 1946; Tehran, Imperial State of Iran
- Died: 3 July 2026 (aged 80); San Francisco, California, U.S.
- Education: University of Tehran
- Occupations: Writer, translator
- Spouse: Nasser Taghvai (m. 1961; div. 1967)
- Children: 1

Shahrnush Parsipur (Persian: شهرنوش پارسی‌پور; 17 February 1946 – 3 July 2026) was an Iranian writer and translator.

== Early life and career ==
Shahrnush Parsipur was born on 17 February 1946 in Tehran, Iran, to Ali Parsipur, a lawyer, and Fakhr-ol-Moluk Vala, a homemaker. She had a brother, Shahbaz, and a sister, Miryam. She spent part of her childhood in Khorramshahr. Parsipur received her B.A. degree in 1973 in sociology from Tehran University, and studied Chinese language and civilization at the Sorbonne in Paris from 1976 to 1980.

Her first book was Tupak-e Qermez (The Little Red Ball – 1969), a story for young people. Her first short stories were published in the late 1960s. One early story appeared in Jong-e Isfahan, no. 9 (June 1972), a special short-story issue that also featured stories by Esma'il Fasih, Houshang Golshiri, Taqi Modarresi, Bahram Sadeghi, and Gholam Hossein Saedi. Her novella Tajrobeha-ye Azad (Trial Offers – 1970) was followed by the novel Sag va Zemestan-e Boland (The Dog and the Long Winter), published in 1976. In 1977, she published a volume of short stories called Avizeh'ha-ye Bolur (Crystal Pendant Earrings).

She was imprisoned four times – one under the Shah regime and three times during the Islamic Republic of Iran. She did not see herself as a political activist.

As of the late 1980s, Parsipur received considerable attention in Tehran literary circles, with the publication of several of her stories and several notices and a lengthy interview with her in Donya-ye Sokhan magazine. Her second novel was Touba va ma'na-ye Shab (Touba and the Meaning of Night – 1989), which Parsipur wrote after spending four years and seven months in prison.

Right before her incarceration, in 1990, Parsipur published a short novel, in the form of connected stories, called Zanan bedun-e Mardan (Women Without Men), which she had finished in the late 1970s. The first chapter appeared in Alefba, no. 5 (1974). The Iranian government banned Women without Men in the mid-1990s and pressured the author to desist from such writing. The English translation of this book, by Faridoun Farrokh, was published in 2025 and longlisted for the 2026 International Booker Prize.

Early in 1990, Parsipur finished her fourth novel, a 450-page story of a female Don Quixote called Aql-e abirang (Blue Logos), which appeared in an English translation in 2020.

In 1994 she emigrated to the United States and wrote Prison Memoir, a 450-page account of her four times in different prisons. In 1996 she wrote her fifth novel Shiva, a science fiction work of 900 pages. In 1999 she published her sixth novel, Majaraha-ye Sadeh va Kuchak-e Ruh-e Deraxt (The Plain and Small Adventures of the Spirit of the Tree), of 300 pages. In 2002, she published her seventh novel, Bar Bal-e Bad Neshastan (On the Wings of Wind), of 700 pages.

== Personal life and death ==
Parsipur married the Iranian film director Nasser Taghvai in 1961. The marriage ended in divorce after seven years. They had a son, Ali, an artist. As of 2026, she resided in exile in Richmond in Northern California and considered herself an American as well as an Iranian.

Parsipur died of a stroke in San Francisco on 3 July 2026, at the age of 80.

== Awards and recognition ==
In 1994, Parsipur was the recipient of a Hellman-Hammett grant, awarded to writers who are in financial need as a result of political persecution, from Human Rights Watch's Free Expression Project. She was honored with the Fiction Award at the Encyclopædia Iranica Gala in Miami in 2003. She was the first recipient of the International Writers Project Fellowship from the Program in Creative Writing and the Watson Institute for International Studies at Brown University for 2003 to 2004. She received an honorary doctorate from Brown University in 2010.

In December 2024, Shahrnush Parsipur was included in the BBC's 100 Women list.

== Views ==
Parsipur believed that the theocratic laws in Iran must be changed to make Iran free. However, she opposed the 2026 attack by the USA and Israel on Iran, saying that they cannot bring liberty to Iran and instead cause suffering and ruin, which she would never forgive. In her view, the Iranians themselves must achieve change in their own country without interference by foreign powers.

== Works ==
=== Novels ===
- Touba and the Meaning of Night (novel – 1989 – طوبی و معنای شب (داستان بلند)
- The Blue Reason (novel – 1994 – عقل آبی (داستان بلند)
- The Simple and Small Adventures of the Spirit of Tree (Novel – 1999 – ماجراهای ساده و کوچک روح درخت (داستان بلند)
- The Dog and the Long Winter (novel – 1974 – سگ و زمستان بلند (داستان بلند)
- Asieh Between Two Worlds (novel – 2009 – آسیه در میان دو دنیا (داستان بلند)
- Shiva (science fiction – 1999 – شیوا (داستان دانش)
- On the Wings of Wind (novel – 2002) بربال باد نشستن (داستان بلند)

=== Other works ===
- Women Without Men (novella – 1989 – (داستانک) زنان بدون مردان
- Trial Offer (novella – 1975 – تجربه های آزاد (داستانک)
- Crystal Pendants (short stories – 1974 – آویزه های بلور (مجموعه داستان)
- Red Ball (short story for children – 1969 – توپک قرمز )
- Tea Ceremony in the Presence of the Wolf (short stories – 1993 – آداب صرف چای در حضور گرگ
- Men from Various Civilizations (novella – 1993 – Translation: Steve MacDowell & Afshin Nassiri داستان های مردان تمدن های مختلف )
- Prison Memoir (memoir – 1996) خاطرات زندان; republished as Kissing the Sword: A Prison Memoir (2013, Feminist Press)
- Heat in the Year Zero (2003)

=== Translations ===
- Chinese Astrology (1975), by Paola Delsol, from English طالع بینی چینی
- Master Lao Tzu and Taoism (1987), by Max Kaltenmark, from French لائوتزه و مرشدان دائوئی نوشته ماکس کالتنمارک، ترجمه از فرانسه
- Tanius' Cliff (1991), by Amin Maalouf, from French صخره تانیوس نوشته امین مالوف، ترجمه از فرانسه ٌ
- Witch Hunting, (1990), by Shirley Jackson, from English شکار جادوگران شرلی جاکسون، ترجمه از زبان انگلیسی
- History of China (1995), from Opium Wars till Cultural Revolution 4 Volumes, from French تاریخ چین، از جنگ های تریاک تا انقلاب فرهنگی، چهار جلد ترجمه از فرانسه
- China History for Young People (1990), from French تاریخ چین برای نو جوانان، ترجمه از فرانسه
- Parapsychology (1990), from the series "What I Know", from French پیراروانشناسی از سری چه می دانم، ترجمه از فرانسه
- Journey to the West (1995), by Wu Cheng'en, translated from French سیر باختر، رمان، نوشته ووچنگ نن، ترجمه از فرانسه ُ
- Spanking the Maid (2004), by Robert Coover مستخدمه کتک خور، نوشته رابرت کوورو ترجمه از انگلیسی
- An Unquiet Mind (2004), by Kay Redfield Jamison — from English ذهن بی قرار، نوشته کای ردفیلد جامیسون، ترجمه از انگلیسی
- Mythology (2003), by a group of professors of different universities اساطیر جهان، نوشته گروه دانشمندان اسطوره شناس دانشگاه های مختلف دنیا ترجمه از انگلیسی

== Translations of her works ==
=== Women without Men ===
Zanan bedun-e Mardan in Persian

- India: Aanungal Illatha Pennungal, translated into Malayalam by S.A. Qudsi and published by Mathrubhumi Books, Calicut, 2005
- Denmark: Kvinder uden mænd, translated into Danish by Nazila Kivi and published by Gyldendal's skala-series, Copenhagen, 2019

The book has also been translated into French (Femmes sans hommes), Polish (Kobiety bez mężczyzn), Romanian (Femei fără bărbați), Portuguese (Mulheres Sem Homens), Spanish (Mujeres sin hombres) and Estonian (Meesteta naised).

=== Tuba and the Meaning of Night ===
Tuba va Ma'na-ye Shab in Persian

- USA - Touba and the Meaning of Night, translated into English by Kamran Talattof, 2005.
- Poland - Tuba i znaczenie nocy translated into Polish by Anna Krasnowolska, 2012.

The book has also been translated into German, Italian, and Swedish.

=== Blue Logos ===
Aql-e abirang in Persian

- USA - Blue Logos, translated into English by M. R. Ghanoonparvar, 2020, ISBN 978-1568593869
