= David Nissman =

American lawyer

David Marshall Nissman (born 1953) is an American attorney and legal author who served for a time as the U.S. Attorney for the District of the Virgin Islands.

== Early life, education, and career ==
Born in Queens, New York, Nissman graduated magna cum laude from Emory University in 1975, and earned a J.D. from the University of Oregon School of Law in 1978.

In 1978, Nissman became a deputy district attorney in Eugene, Oregon, also teaching as an adjunct professor at the University of Oregon School of Law and writing several legal textbooks, including Beating the Insanity Defense (1980), The Prosecution Function (1982), and Law of Confessions (1986).

In 1984, he declared his intent to run for a seat on the Oregon Supreme Court, against incumbent Hans A. Linde. Running in a three-way race in the primary, Nissman carried nine counties and came in third with 25% of the vote, with the other two candidates being forced into a runoff election. In 1986, he prosecuted double-murderer Daniel Nick, who killed two neighbors with a shovel and claimed as his defense that he believed the victims were aliens sent to spy on him.

== Federal legal work ==
By 1987, Nissman had relocated to the U.S. Virgin Islands, as an Assistant United States Attorney. By 1994, Nissman was chief of the criminal division for the U.S. Attorney in the Virgin Islands, and by the end of 1994, he had become the Acting U.S. Attorney.

On April 18, 2002, Nissman was formally appointed by President George W. Bush as the 19th U.S. Attorney for the District of the Virgin Islands.

During his tenure the U.S. Attorney, he prosecuted many high-profile cases, including a case against the V.I. government for fraudulently circumventing the competitive process and awarding a $3.6 million contract for major sewer repairs on St. Croix to a local company with no experience. The government later cancelled the contract.

Nissman retired as U.S. Attorney in 2004.

== Later life ==
After his retirement, the U.S. Attorney's Office Building on St. Croix was named the David Marshall Nissman Justice Center.

As of 2012, he was a senior partner of ILP + McChain Miller Nissman. In January 2024, Washington, D.C.-based Community Redevelopment Inc. issued a press release announcing that Nissman had joined its board of directors.

== Personal life ==
Nissman has three children.

== Publications ==
- Beating the Insanity Defense (1980); with Brian R. Barnes and Geoffrey P. Alpert.
- The Prosecution Function (1982), with Ed Hagan.
- Law of Confessions (1986), with Ed Hagan.
- Proving Federal Crimes (Corpus Juris Publishing),
