= Comparative Studies of South Asia, Africa and the Middle East =

Academic journal

- Discipline: Comparative Studies
- Language: English
- Edited by: Marwa Elshakry, Steven Pierce

Publication details
- History: 1993–present
- Publisher: Duke University Press (United States)
- Frequency: Triannually

Standard abbreviations
- ISO 4: Comp. Stud. South Asia Afr. Middle East

Indexing
- ISSN: 1089-201X (print); 1548-226X (web)
- OCLC no.: 54038458

Links
- Journal homepage; Online access

Comparative Studies of South Asia, Africa and the Middle East is a triannual peer-reviewed academic journal covering Comparative Studies on Africa, the Middle East, and South Asia. It provides a "critical and comparative analyses of the histories, cultural productions, social and gender relations, politics, and economies" of these regions. It is published by the Duke University Press, and since 2012, edited at Columbia University.

== Abstracting and indexing ==
The journal is abstracted and indexed in:

- Arab World Research Source
- CSA (Note: Merged with ProQuest in 2007.) (Linguistics & Language Behavior Abstracts, Sociological Abstracts, Worldwide Political Science Abstracts)
- EBSCO databases (Historical Abstracts, Political Science Complete, Public Affairs Index)
- Emerging Sources Citation Index
- GEOBASE
- Index Islamicus
- International Bibliography of Periodical Literature
- International Bibliography of the Social Sciences
- Modern Language Association Database
- ProQuest
- Scopus

== History ==
The journal came into existence in 1993 as an expansion of South Asia Bulletin journal which was established in 1981. In 1993 and 1994, the issues of South Asia Bulletin were published with the sub-title Comparative Studies of South Asia, Africa and the Middle East. In 1995, South Asia Bulletin was merged with the journal.

== Editors-in-chief ==
- Marwa Elshakry and Steven Pierce (2021–present)
- Marwa Elshakry, Steven Pierce and Anupama Rao (2020–2021)
- Anupama Rao and Marwa Elshakry (2019–2020)
- Timothy Mitchell and Anupama Rao (2014–2018)
- Mohamad Tavakoli-Targhi (2001–2012)
- Sucheta Mazumdar and Vasant Kaiwar (founding editors)
