= Ali Banuazizi =

Political scientist

Ali Banuazizi (Persian: علی بنوعزیزی) is a research professor of political science at Boston College.

== Life and works ==
Banuazizi received a B.S. from the University of Michigan in 1963, an M.A. from The New School for Social Research in New York in 1965, and a Ph.D. from Yale University in 1968.

=== Selected publications ===
- The New geopolitics of Central Asia and its borderlands. Internet Archive. Bloomington : Indiana University Press. 1994. ISBN 978-0-253-31139-9.

==== Editorials ====
- Weiner, Myron; Banuazizi, Ali (1994). The Politics of social transformation in Afghanistan, Iran, and Pakistan. Internet Archive. Syracuse, N.Y. : Syracuse University Press. ISBN 978-0-8156-2608-4.
- The State, religion, and ethnic politics : Afghanistan, Iran, and Pakistan. Internet Archive. [Syracuse, N.Y.] : Syracuse University Press. 1986. ISBN 978-0-8156-2385-4.
- Banuazizi, Ali (1984). Social stratification in the Middle East and North Africa : a bibliographic survey. Internet Archive. London; New York : Mansell. ISBN 978-0-7201-1711-0.

==== Other contributions ====
- Miskūb, Shāhrukh; Perry, John R.; Banuazizi, Ali (1992). Iranian nationality and the Persian language. Internet Archive. Washington, D.C. : Mage Publishers. ISBN 978-0-934211-21-5.
