= Iranian Studies (journal) =

- Discipline: Iranian studies
- Language: English
- Edited by: Nasrin Rahimieh

Publication details
- History: 1967–present
- Publisher: Cambridge University Press
- Frequency: Quarterly
- Impact factor: 0.7 (2023)

Standard abbreviations
- ISO 4: Iran. Stud.

Indexing
- ISSN: 0021-0862 (print); 1475-4819 (web)
- LCCN: sn85060395
- JSTOR: 00210862
- OCLC no.: 1753915

Links
- Journal homepage; Online access; Online archive

Iranian Studies is a peer-reviewed academic journal covering Iranian and Persianate history, literature, and society published quarterly by Cambridge University Press on behalf of the Association for Iranian Studies (formerly known as the International Society for Iranian Studies). It was established in 1967 and up to 2021 was published 6 times a year by Routledge. The editor-in-chief is Nasrin Rahimieh.

== Editors-in-chief ==
The following persons are or have been editors-in-chief:

- Ali Banuazizi (1968–1982), founding editor
- Ervand Abrahamian and Farhad Kazemi (1982–1986)
- Richard W. Bulliet (1987–1989)
- Abbas Amanat (1990–1997)
- Robert D. McChesney (1998–2003)
- Homa Katouzian (2004–2016)
- Ali Gheissari (2016–2021)
- Sussan Siavoshi (2021–2023)
- Nasrin Rahimieh (2023–present)

== Abstracting and indexing ==
The journal is abstracted and indexed in:

- Arts and Humanities Citation Index
- Current Contents/Arts & Humanities
- Current Contents/Social and Behavioral Sciences
- Index Islamicus
- International Bibliography of Periodical Literature
- Linguistic Bibliography
- Modern Language Association Database
- ProQuest databases
- Scopus
- Social Sciences Citation Index

According to the Journal Citation Reports, the journal has a 2023 impact factor of 0.7.
