= Shireen Hunter =

Iranian political scientist (born 1945)

Personal details
- Born: Tabriz, Iran
- Spouse: Robert E. Hunter

Shireen Tahmaaseb Hunter is an Iranian-American independent scholar. Until 2019, she was a research professor at the Center for Muslim-Christian Understanding (ACMCU) at Georgetown University in Washington, D.C., with which she had been associated since 2005 as a visiting fellow and then visiting professor She became an honorary fellow of ACMCU in September 2019.

== Career ==
From 1965 to 1979 during the Pahlavi era, Hunter served as a diplomat in the Iranian ministry of Foreign Affairs. She was at the Center for Strategic and International Studies in Washington from 1983 to 2005, as director of the Islam Program, 1998–2005, deputy director of the Middle East Program, 1983–1992, and senior associate (while in Brussels), 1993–1998. She also taught courses at Georgetown, George Mason University, and Washington College. She was an Academic Fellow at Carnegie Corporation.

From 1993 to 1997, Hunter was a visiting senior fellow at the Centre for European Policy Studies (CEPS) in Brussels and directed CEPS' Mediterranean Program. She was a guest scholar at the Brookings Institution and a research fellow at the Harvard University Center for International Affairs.

Her ACMCU profile notes that she has written 16 books and monographs and has contributed to the publication of 12 books and monographs. In addition, she has written over 100 book chapters and journal articles and over 500 opinion pieces. Hunter has lectured widely in the United States and the Middle East, among others and has extensive media experience.

== Views ==
Hunter is known to have authored one of the first articles on the question of identity within the post-Soviet Republic of Azerbaijan. Hunter's field research about Azerbaijan's political elite and their pan-Turkist irredentist views towards Iran puts emphasis on the detestation by such elites of Iranian Azeri nationalists. Her research also put emphasis on how the ruling establishment in Azerbaijan's capital of Baku are anxious about a feasible irredentist counter-claim by Iran and its Azeri elites on the Republic of Azerbaijan, and how they fear that ethnic nationalist irredentism may boomerang back at them. According to Hunter, the existence of pro-Iranian sentiments among the inhabitants of the southern parts of the Azerbaijan Republic serve as evidence that concerns of this kind are perhaps legitimate.

== Personal life ==
Hunter was born in Tabriz, Iran and is an Iranian Azeri. She moved to the United States in 1978, and became a naturalized U.S. citizen in 1985. She was married to Robert E. Hunter from 1980 until his death in 2026.

In 2021, Hunter was named by Carnegie Corporation of New York as an honoree of the Great Immigrants Award

== Bibliography ==
- Iran Divided: Historic Roots of Iranian Debates in Identity, Culture and Governance in the 21st Century, Rowman & Littlefield, September 2014.
- Iran's Foreign Policy in the Post-Soviet Era, Resisting the New International Order, Praeger, 2010.
- Reformist Voices of Islam : Mediating Islam and Modernity (editor and contributor), M.E. Sharpe, June 2008.
- Islam and Human Rights: Advancing a US-Muslim Dialogue (co-editor), CSIS Press, 2005.
- Modernization, Democracy, and Islam (co-editor and contributor), Praeger, 2005 (Translated into Persian.)
- Islam in Russia: The Politics of Identity and Security, M.E. Sharpe, 2004.
- Strategic Developments in Eurasia After September 11 (editor), Frank Cass, 2003.
- Islam: Europe's Second Religion (editor and contributor), Praeger, 2002.
- The Future of Islam-West Relations: Clash of Civilizations or Peaceful Coexistence?, CSIS/Praeger, 1998. (Translated into Persian and Arabic.)
- Central Asia Since Independence, CSIS/Westview Press, 1996.
- The Transcaucasus in Transition: Nation-Building and Conflict, CSIS/Praeger, 1994.
- Iran After Khomeini, Praeger, 1992.
- Iran and the World: Continuity in a Revolutionary Decade, Indiana University Press, 1990.
- The Politics of Islamic Revivalism: Diversity and Unity (editor and contributor), Indiana University Press, 1988.
- U.S. and the Middle East: Emerging Economic and Political Trends (editor), Westview Press, July 1985.
- OPEC and the Third World: The Politics of Aid, Croom Helm Ltd. and Indiana University Press, 1984.
