= Touraj Atabaki =

Iranian academic (born 1950)

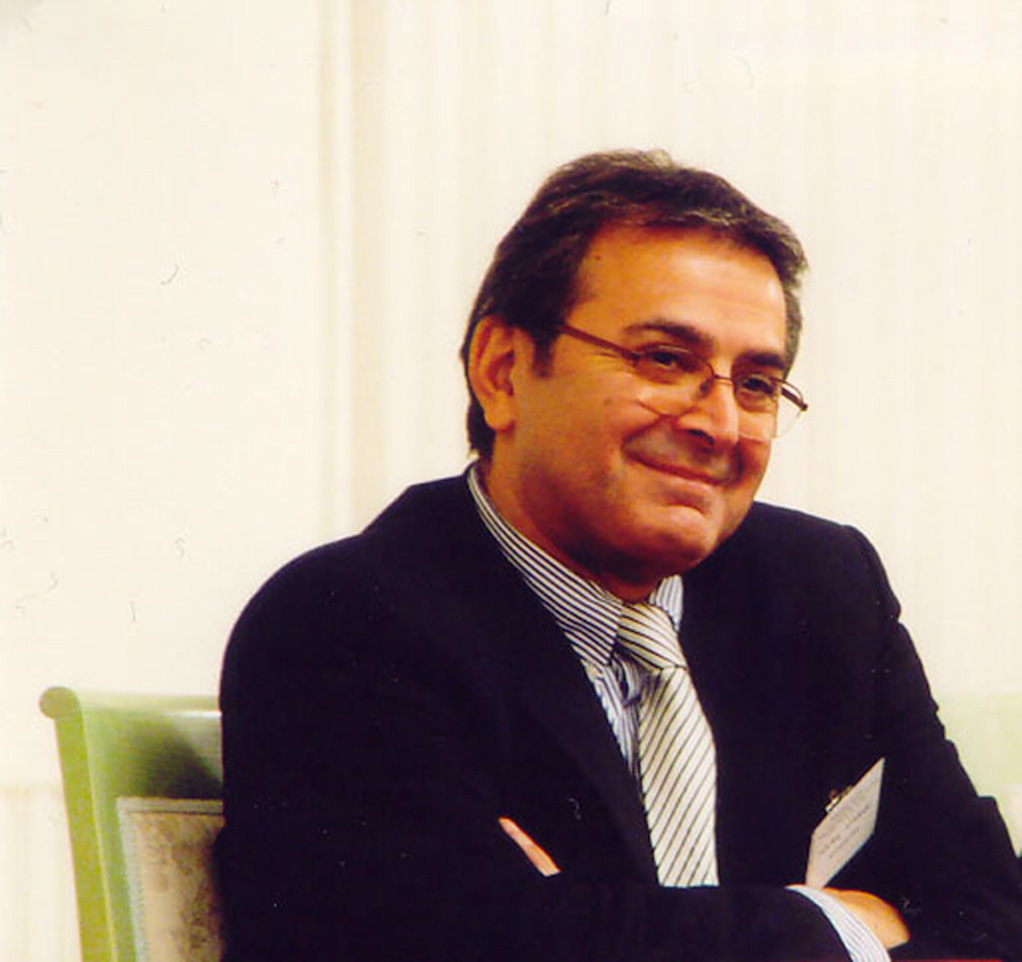
- Touraj Atabaki, Iranian scholar
- Born: 23 February 1950 (age 76); Tehran, Iran
- Citizenship: Iranian–Dutch

Academic background
- Education: National University of Iran; University of London; Utrecht University
- Thesis: Ethnicity and Autonomy in Iranian Azarbayjan: the Autonomous government of Azarbayjan 1946 (1991)
- Doctoral advisor: Ervand Abrahamian

Academic work
- Discipline: Social history
- Institutions: Utrecht University; International Institute of Social History; University of Amsterdam; Leiden University
- Website: iisg.amsterdam/nl/node/323

Touraj Atabaki (Persian: تورج اتابکی, born February 23, 1950) is Emeritus Professor of Social History of the Middle East and Central Asia at Leiden University. He has been the Senior Research Fellow at the International Institute of Social History in Amsterdam. He was former president of the Association for Iranian Studies and the European Society for Central Asian Studies.

Atabaki earned his doctorate from Utrecht University in 1991 with a dissertation titled Ethnicity and autonomy in Iranian Azarbayjan: the autonomous government of Azarbayjan 1946.

His book Toiling for Oil. A Social History of Petroleum in Iran (Cambridge University Press, 20245) was the winner of the British-Kuwait Friendship Society Book Prize in Middle Eastern Studies (2025), and El Grand Continent selected it as one of the 10th must-read books (2025).

== Books ==
Atabaki's books include:

- Iranian Exiles and Stalin’s Great Terror. State Violence in the 1930s Soviet Union, co-authored: Lana Ravandi-Fadai (Edinburgh University Press, 2026)
- Toiling for Oil. A Social History of Petroleum in Iran (Cambridge University Press, 2025)
- Fada'i Guerrilla Praxis in Iran, 1970 - 1979: Narratives and Reflections on Everyday Life, co-authored: Nasser Mohajer (Bloomsbury Publishing PLC, 2025)
- Iran in the 20th Century: Historiography and Political Culture (I. B. Tauris, 2009)
- The State and the Subaltern: Modernization, Society and the State in Turkey and Iran (I. B. Tauris, 2007)
- Iran and the First World War: Battleground of the Great Powers (edited, I. B. Tauris, 2006)
- Men of Order: Authoritarian Modernization under Atatürk and Reza Shah (I. B. Tauris, 2004)
- Azerbaijan: Ethnicity and the Struggle for Power in Iran (I. B. Tauris, 2000)
- Post-Soviet Central Asiaz, co-editor: John O'Kane (I. B. Tauris, 1998)
- Azerbaijan: Ethnicity and Autonomy in Twentieth-Century Iran (I. B. Tauris, 1993)
