= Amir Hossein Khan Ilkhani =

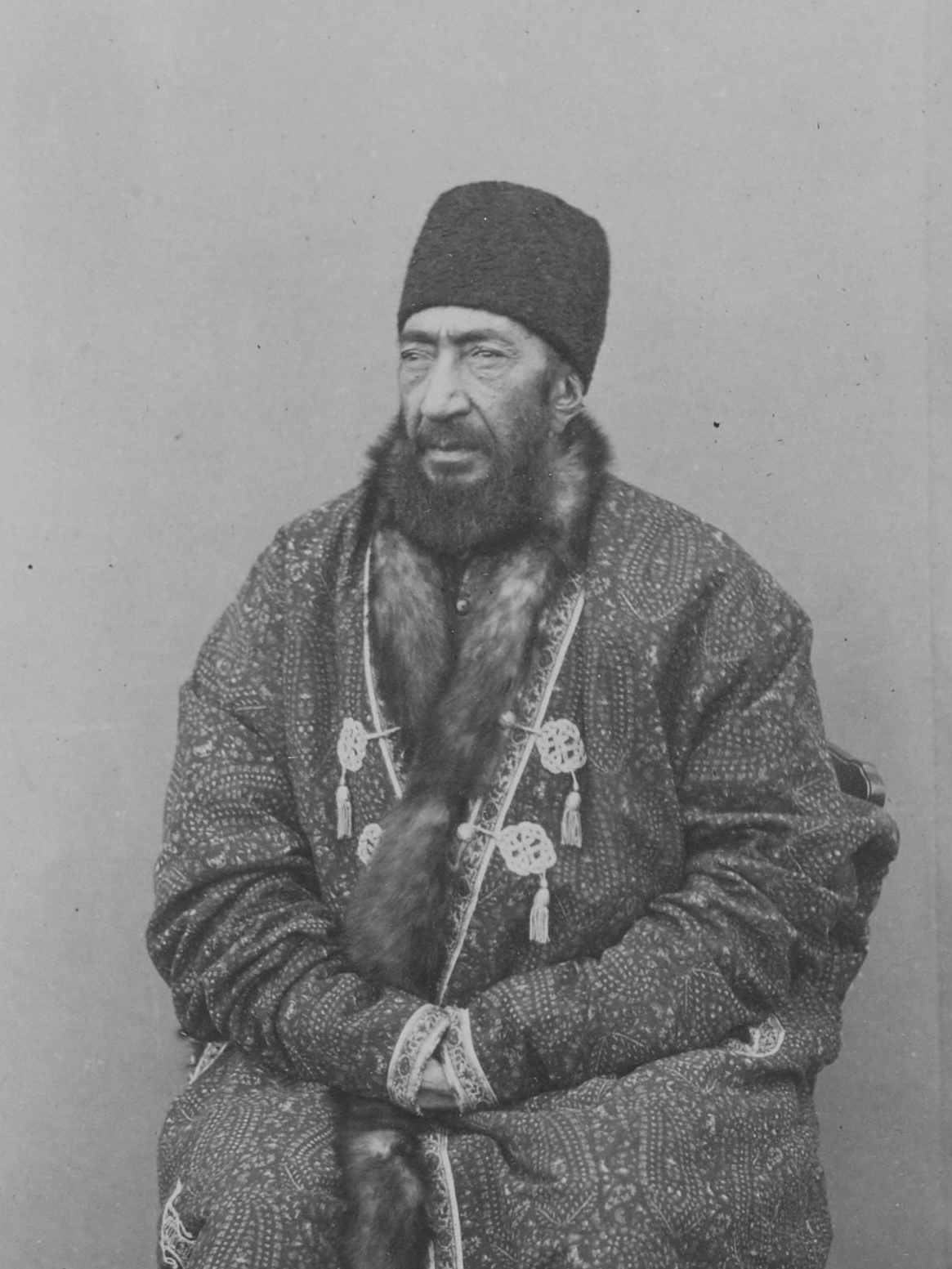
- Portrait by Jean-Baptiste Feuvrier, 1889

Governor of Quchan
- In office 1866/67–1893/94
- Monarch: Naser al-Din Shah Qajar
- Preceded by: Sam Khan Ilkhani Zafaranlu
- Succeeded by: Reza Qoli Khan

Personal details
- Died: 1893/94

Amir Hossein Khan Ilkhani (Persian: امیرحسین‌خان ایلخانی) was the leader of the Kurdish Zafaranlu tribe and ruler of the town of Quchan in the eastern Iranian province of Khorasan from 1866/67 until his death in 1893/94. He was the brother and successor of Sam Khan Ilkhani Zafaranlu.

During his rule, he was one of northern Khorasan's most affluent and influential hereditary rulers. He possessed private properties from Mashhad to Bojnord and was capable of raising 30,000 troops. During this period, the Zafaranlu tribe was highly regarded and the Iranian government regularly employed 1,000 cavalrymen from the tribe. In 1867/68, Amir Hossein Khan Ilkhani was rewarded with the title of Shoja od-Dowleh.

He was succeeded by his nephew Reza Qoli Khan, who was later succeeded by Amir Hossein Khan Ilkhani's son Mohammad Naser Khan Shoja od-Dowleh.

== Sources ==
- Qassabi-Nejad, Ali Pur Safar (2016). "Zafaranlu". Encyclopaedia of the World of Islam (in Persian). Vol. 21. Encyclopaedia Islamica Foundation. ISBN 9789644470127.
