= Sam Khan Ilkhani Zafaranlu =

Kurdish tribe leader (died 1866/67)

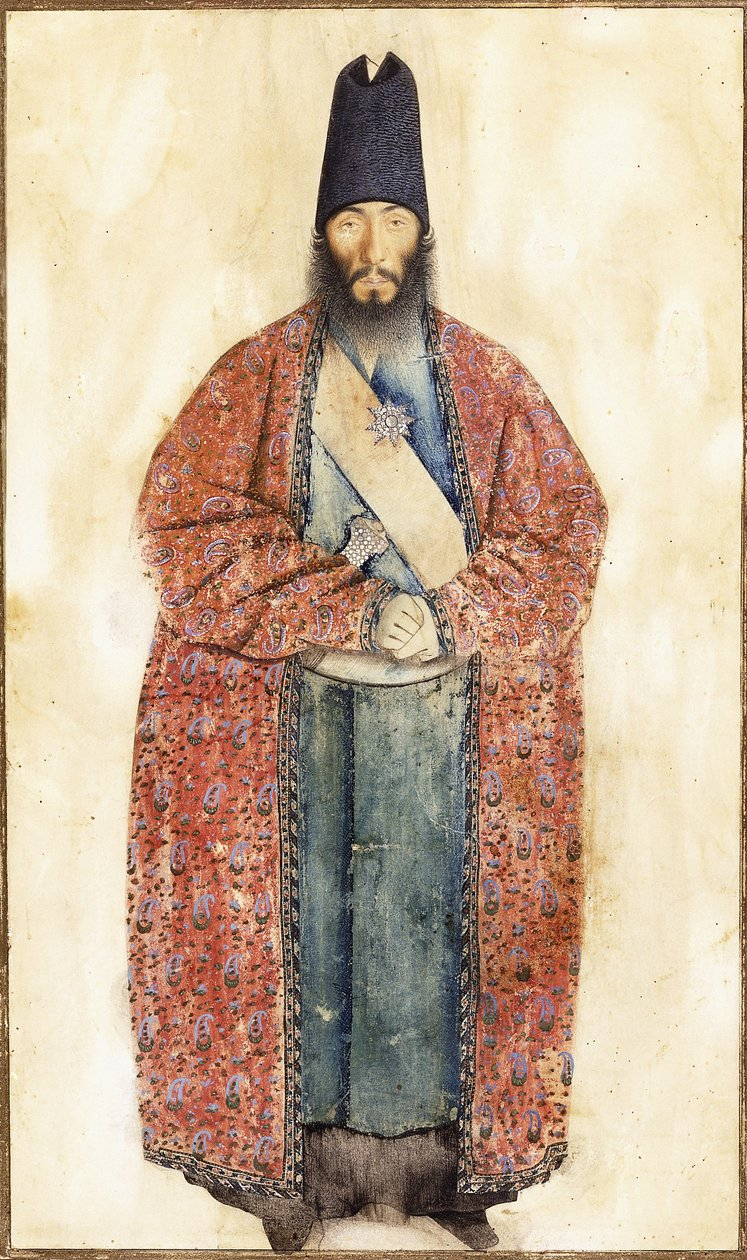
- Portrait of Sam Khan Ilkhani Zafaranlu, made in the late 19th-century
- Died: 1866/67
- Relatives: Reza Qoli Khan Zafaranlu (father); Amir Hossein Khan Ilkhani (brother)
- Military career
- Conflicts: Second Herat War

Sam Khan Ilkhani Zafaranlu (Persian: سام‌‌خان ایلخانی زعفرانلو, romanized: Sām Xān Ilxāni Zaeferānlu; died 1866/67) was the leader of the Kurdish Zafaranlu tribe and ruler of the town of Quchan in the eastern Iranian province of Khorasan from 1833 until his death. He was the son and successor of Reza Qoli Khan Zafaranlu.

Given that his father had been a fervent opponent of the Iranian government, Sam Khan Ilkhani's ascent to power was an unexpected development. He played a crucial part in suppressing the Rebellion of Hasan Khan Salar, the expedition against the Turkmens in 1851, the interference in Herat in 1852, the protection of Sarakhs against the Khanate of Khiva in 1854, and the Second Herat War. After his death, he was succeeded by his brother Amir Hossein Khan Ilkhani.

== Biography ==
The Kurdish Zafaranlu tribe originally lived in the Kurdish areas of western Iran, before the Safavid ruler Shah Abbas I (r. 1587–1629) deported them to Khorasan to fend off Uzbek attacks. By the late Safavid period, the Zafaranlu had taken over the town of Quchan. As they had done under the Safavids, the Zafaranlu also provided military support to the Qajar dynasty of Iran. Sam Khan Ilkhani was a son of Reza Qoli Khan Zafaranlu, the leader of the Zafaranlu and ruler of Quchan. Reza Qoli Khan Zafaranlu occasionally supported or clashed with the Iranian government. On 4 September 1832, he was forced to surrender to the Iranian government, who had Quchan destroyed. In June 1833, he was exiled to the Azerbaijan province, but died on his way there. Sam Khan Ilkhani subsequently became the new ruler of the Zafaranlu and Quchan. Despite numerous incidents of hostility, the Zafaranlu rulers of Quchan managed to hold onto their status as the most influential vassals of the Iranian government. During the end of the rule of the Qajar ruler Mohammad Shah (r. 1834–1848), Sam Khan Ilkhani was transported to Tehran and put under surveillance until 1847/48.

When word of the Rebellion of Hasan Khan Salar reached Sam Khan Ilkhani, he secretly went to Khorasan and joined forces with Morad Mirza, who had been tasked with suppressing the rebellion. Due to the extreme cold and snowstorm, Morad Mirza was unable to achieve much. The survival of his troops was totally dependent on the assistance of Sam Khan Ilkhani. Hasan Khan Salar was ultimately defeated and executed in the spring of 1850 by Morad Mirza, who became the new governor of Khorasan.

During his term as governor of Khorasan, Morad Mirza worked to increase Iranian influence in Herat and along the northern border. Morad Mirza's selection of allies strengthened the tribal leadership of the Khorasani places of Quchan, Dargaz and Bojnord. Sam Khan Ilkhani, who had shown himself to be a loyal supporter of the Iranian government throughout Hasan Khan Salar's rebellion, played a crucial part in the expedition against the Turkmens in 1851, the interference in Herat in 1852, the protection of Sarakhs against the Khanate of Khiva in 1854, and the Second Herat War. Given that his father had been a fervent opponent of the Iranian government, Sam Khan Ilkhani's ascent to power was an unexpected development.

In March 1852, Sardar Kuhandil Khan, the Mohammadzai leader of the city of Kandahar, conquered the towns of Farah and Esfezar and advanced to the boundaries of Herat. The Iranian government reacted by sending two different armies, led by Sam Khan Ilkhani and Abbasqoli Khan Darragazi. Kuhandil Khan abandoned his plans for Herat and retreated to Kandahar when Iranian forces reached Herat. Sam Khan Ilkhani controlled the citadel of Herat until the third week of May 1852, when it was returned to Sa'id Mohammad Khan. However, for an additional three months, the Iranian troops remained in the area around Herat.

Sam Khan Ilkhani died in 1866/67 and was succeeded by his brother Amir Hossein Khan Ilkhani.

== Sources ==
- Noelle-Karimi, Christine (2014). The Pearl in its Midst: Herat and the Mapping of Khurasan (15th-19th Centuries). Austrian Academy of Sciences. ISBN 978-3700172024.
- Qassabi-Nejad, Ali Pur Safar (2016). "Zafaranlu". Encyclopaedia of the World of Islam (in Persian). Vol. 21. Encyclopaedia Islamica Foundation. ISBN 9789644470127.
