= Behrouz =

- Pronunciation: Persian: [behɾuːz]
- Gender: Male

Origin
- Origin: Persian
- Meaning: Prosperous
- Region of origin: Iran

Other names
- Alternative spelling: Behrooz, Behrus, Behruz, bihuroz

Behrouz, Behrooz, Behrus or bihuroz (Persian: بهروز) is a Persian given name, usually masculine, loosely meaning prosperous or fortunate.

It means "Success" and when translated word by word, it means "[the man who has] good lifetime" (beh: good, rooz: day (and it refers to roozegar: lifetime)). In old Maldivian calendar Bihuroz was the New Year Day, which was the seventh day of Assidha. The name indicates someone that has good days in life, or simply, is happy or prosperous.

== People with the name Behrouz ==
=== Given name ===
- Amir Behrouz, 16th century Kurdish leader
  - and his grandson, Behrouz Khan Donboli
- Behrouz Afagh, Iranian journalist
- Behrouz Afkhami, Iranian filmmaker
- Behrouz Afshar, Iranian footballer
- Behrouz Ataei, Iranian volleyball coach
- Behrouz Boochani, Kurdish journalist and author
- Behrouz Boroumand, Iranian physician
- Behrooz Ghamari-Tabrizi, Iranian-American historian, sociologist
- Behrouz Gharibpour, Iranian theater director
- Behrouz Heyriev, Tajikistani footballer
- Behrouz Jamshidi, Iranian Olympic wrestler
- Behruz Karimov, Uzbekistani footballer
- Behrouz Kamalvandi, Iranian diplomat
- Behrouz Makvandi, Iranian footballer
- Behrouz Nemati, Iranian politician
- Behrouz Pakniat, Iranian footballer
- Behrouz Rahbar, Iranian Olympic cyclist
- Behrouz Rahbarifar, Iranian football player
- Behrouz Saffarian, Iranian composer
- Behrouz Sebt Rasoul, Iranian actor, filmmaker
- Behrouz Servatian, Iranian literary scholar
- Behrouz Soltani, Iranian football player
- Behrouz Souresrafil, Iranian journalist
- Behrouz Javid Tehrani, Iranian student and dissident, currently in prison
- Behrouz Vossoughi, Iranian actor

=== Surname ===
- Zabih Behrouz, Iranian scholar
- Zahra Behrouz Azar, Iranian researcher
