= Behrouz Khan Donboli =

Behrouz Khan Donboli was a chieftain of the Kurdish Donboli tribe in Safavid Iran during the reign of Shah Abbas I (r. 1587–1629) and Shah Safi (r. 1629–1642). He was the grandson of Amir Behrouz. In 1609/10, while serving as the governor of Churs, he and Pir Budaq Khan Pornak, the governor of Tabriz, drove the forces of the Ottoman commander Muhammad Pasha back. In 1616/17, Behrouz Khan was given the title of Khan due to his role in stopping an attack on Salmas by Kurdish rebels. He died in 1631/32 in a fortress he had built in Churs.

== Sources ==
- Golshani, Abdol-Karim (2014). "Behrouz Khan". Encyclopaedia of the World of Islam (in Persian). Vol. 4. Encyclopaedia Islamica Foundation. ISBN 9004246916.
