= NGO-ization =

NGO-ization (or 'NGO-isation') refers to the professionalization, bureaucratization, and institutionalization of social movements as they adopt the form of nongovernmental organizations (NGOs). It led to NGOs' depoliticizing discourses and practices of social movements. The term has been introduced in the context of Western European women's movements, but since the late 1990s has been employed to assess the role of organized civil society on a global scale. It is also used by Indian writer Arundhati Roy, who speaks about the NGO-ization of resistance, and more generally, about the NGO-ization of politics. Across the world, the number of internationally operating NGOs is around 40,000. The number of national NGOs in countries is higher, with around 1-2 million NGOs in India and 277,000 NGOs in Russia.

== History ==
NGO-ization is a process resulting from neoliberal globalization. It consists of the flourishing of NGOs founded on issue-specific interventions associated with the rising centrality of civil society where NGOs are in charge of social services that used to be fulfilled by the public sector. As a result, some have described this process as an outworking of foreign policy (from countries in the Global North) that is redefining the relationships (in the Global South) between society, the state and external actors.

From a political point of view, NGOs are sometimes referred to as a third sector that has the capacity to balance the power of the state. The broadening of the political configuration suggests a better governance where NGOs are enabling a real "bottom-up democracy" that promotes pluralism and the development of a civil society. Joseph Stiglitz referred to this process as the emergence of a "post-Washington consensus". From an economic point of view, some have argued that NGOs are able to provide social welfare services to the most vulnerable "at lower cost and higher standards of quality than government". However, many scholars have been very critical towards the process of NGO-ization as the case studies below suggest. Indeed, some argue that the disadvantaged communities that supposedly benefit from the services of NGOs are first and foremost "the products of neoliberal policies expressed in privatization and decentralization of state institutions".

In addition, some scholars have argued that NGOs represent a new kind of dependency on countries from the Global North and stand as a form of neocolonialism towards countries from the Global South. Similarly, there are on-going debates concerning the actual interests and legitimacy of NGOs considering their links to the states that funded them in the Global North. For this purpose, the social scientist Sangeeta Kamat pointed out that "NGO's dependence on external funding and compliance with funding agency targets raise doubts about whether their accountability lies with the people or with the funding agencies".

== Latin American women's movements ==
In Latin America, the political scientist Sonia E. Alvarez points out that NGOs have been established for a long period already. In the 1970s, many NGOs focused on women's rights in a variety of domains such as political mobilization, popular education, working-class or poor women's empowerment. However, the activities of these NGOs have shifted during the past two decades (hand-in-hand with the process of NGO-ization) towards other specializations such as gender policy assessment, social services delivery and project execution. The fact that feminist NGOs have been increasingly assigned a different role (by intergovernmental organizations or local governments) have important consequences. According to Alvarez, "this trend threatens to reduce feminist NGOs' cultural–political interventions in the public debate about gender equity and women's citizenship to largely technical ones".

In addition to this, Alvarez argues that the feminist NGOs consulted on gender-focused policies are carefully selected by neoliberal States. Therefore, even though the selected feminist NGOs have a role of intermediary to societal constituencies, Alvarez argues that "other actors in the expansive Latin American women's movement field – particularly popular women's groups and feminist organizations that are publicly critical of the New (Gendered) Policy Agenda – are denied direct access to gender policy debates and thereby effectively politically silenced".

== Arab women's movements ==
As the feminist scholar Islah Jad argues, the emergence of women's NGOs with very specific objectives brought a radical shift to Arab women's activism. In the beginning of the 20th century, women used to get together in literary salons, charitable societies and women's political unions and reached a large audience in villages as well as in Palestinian refugee camps (after 1948) where women were members and part of the general assemblies. The success of these grassroots organizations relied on the qualities of their cadres that were mobilizing people thanks to their social skills. In addition, Islah Jad points out that they had "a strong belief in the political formations to which they belonged" and people knew them on a personal level thanks to the numerous hours they spent organizing and networking.

On the other hand, the way NGOs are structured and work is very different. The power of decision-making usually relies on the highly qualified director of the board while his or her success doesn't depend on an ability to mobilize local people but rather on "his or her ability to fundraise, be convincing, presentable and able to deliver the well-written reports that donors require" often in English.

Rather than a face-to-face human contact, the communication is often established through globalized and modern tools such as media (including social media such as social networks and blogs), conferences and workshops. It is therefore abstract and receptive rather than interactive and it targets a specific group of people that is part of a project. As Islah Jad points out, these projects are rarely driven by volunteerism and conviction in the aim to mobilize the population but rather executed by professionals that are hired by NGOs "to do the job".

The differences between NGOs and social movements are seen as important to consider in order to assess the capacity of each to bring about social change as well as economic progress. In this perspective, a bottom-up approach implying a "locally grounded vision and a more sustainable power basis for social change" has better chances to succeed.

== Impoverished urban communities ==
Similarly, Asef Bayat has argued that "the professionalization of NGOs tends to diminish the mobilizational feature of grassroots activism, while it establishes a new form of clientelism". For this purpose, Mike Davis has claimed that the "true beneficiaries" of what is sometimes referred to as the "participatory turn" have been the thousands of NGOs operating in the slums of the Global South rather than local populations. According to Davis, the outcome of the NGO-ization "has been to bureaucratize and deradicalize urban social movements". To illustrate his position, Davis considers land regularization and argues that "land purchase and title formalization have produced vertical social differentiation and bitter competition within once militant squatter movements".

== The aid system in Africa ==
Julie Hearn has compared the "New Policy Agenda" applied in African countries to a renewed form of intervention and dependency from the Global South towards the Global North. For this purpose, Hearn explored the consequences of the involvement of NGOs in the aid system in countries such as Kenya.

First, Hearn found that through (financially dependent) NGOs, western states have expanded their influence in Africa from a few African states to the rest of the society. As a result, NGOs should be considered as political actors rather than mere "neutral humanitarians". Second, Hearn argues that in the process of NGO-ization the unit of development has shifted from society to local communities. Thus, while some communities may benefit from the services provided by NGOs, those left apart will remain impoverished in a stagnant society. On this account, Hearn claims that this leads to a fragmented process of development "with no provision of universal services and therefore no attempt at equity".

In addition, this model of development is questioned for its capacity to overcome a peripheral state of dependency. For this purpose, Hearn observes that if projects of major societal transformation don't complement food security and health care projects provided by NGOs, there will be two contrasting models of development in the world : "survival of sorts in Africa and progress for the rest of the World".

== World Social Forum ==
The World Social Forum has been criticized for replacing popular movements of the poor with NGOs. Movements of the poor in poorer parts of the world, like Africa, have argued that they are almost completely excluded from the forum and in countries like Kenya and South Africa they have protested against donor funded NGOs that, they argue, determine and dominate African representation at the forum. It has also been argued that NGOs sometimes compete with popular grassroots movements for access to the forum and for influence there.

The 2007 World Social Forum in Nairobi, Kenya in particular was criticized as a "NGO fair" because of how many NGOs attended, crowding out less formal groups of activists. Also, it has been alleged that at the Forum not all the attendees were properly represented, with the bigger and wealthier NGOs having far more space to talk and lead the events, while others were marginalized.

Raúl Zibechi argues that there is a "crisis" of the World Social Forum in that it has been "weakened" as it has been "taken over" by "those who were most capable of 'leading' assemblies, professionals from universities and NGOs".

== See also ==
- Criticism of non-governmental organizations
- Eurocentrism
- Neocolonialism
- Orientalism
- Structural adjustment
