= Amir Behrouz =

Amir Behrouz (1487–1577) was a chieftain of the Kurdish Donboli tribe in Safavid Iran from 1527 to 1577.

He was the son of Amir Rostam Shahverdi Beg and grandson of Amir Bahlul. Because of their military devotion to the Safavids, the Donboli gained renown and admiration at the start of the 16th century. After embracing the Safavid order, Amir Behrouz became one of the most loyal followers of its leader, Ismail I, and led his tribe to adopt the same faith, Shia Islam. As a result, Ismail honored him with the title Soleyman Khalifeh.

In 1533/34, amid harsh winter conditions, Amir Behrouz led a contingent of roughly two thousand Donboli horsemen to join the Safavid forces under Shah Tahmasp I during the Ottoman invasion of the Azerbaijan province. At the suggestion of Kurdish chief Hasan Beg, Iskandar, the Ottoman governor of Van, attacked Khoy and killed its Donboli governor Haji Beg Donboli in 1548. This caused instability amongst the Donboli, who shifted their allegiance between the Ottomans and Safavids. Many of the Donboli leaders were subsequently killed under the orders of Shah Tahmasp I, with the exception of Amir Behrouz, who remained loyal.

Amir Behrouz died in 1577 at the age of 90. Behrouz Khan Donboli was his grandson.

== Sources ==
- Davud, Ali Al-e; Oberling, Pierre (1995). "Donbolī". In Yarshater, Ehsan (ed.). Encyclopædia Iranica (Online ed.). Encyclopædia Iranica Foundation. ISBN 978-0933273719.
- Nikitine, Basil (1960). "Bihrūz". In Gibb, H. A. R.; Kramers, J. H.; Lévi-Provençal, E.; Schacht, J.; Lewis, B. & Pellat, Ch. (eds.). The Encyclopaedia of Islam, Second Edition. Volume I: A–B. Leiden: E. J. Brill. OCLC 495469456.
- Golshani, Abdol-Karim (2014a). "Behrouz, Amir". Encyclopaedia of the World of Islam (in Persian). Vol. 4. Encyclopaedia Islamica Foundation. ISBN 9004246916.
- Golshani, Abdol-Karim (2014b). "Behrouz Khan". Encyclopaedia of the World of Islam (in Persian). Vol. 4. Encyclopaedia Islamica Foundation. ISBN 9004246916.
