= Islah (disambiguation) =

Islah or Al-Islah is an Arabic word usually translated as "reform", in the sense of "to improve, to better, to correct something and removing vice or to put something into a better position."

Islah may also refer to:

== People ==
- Islah Jad (born 1951), Palestinian professor and academician in Birzeit University

== Places ==
- Islah, Qalqilya, village in the Palestinian West Bank
- Al-Islah Mosque, Muslim mosque in Michigan
- Madrasatul Islah, an Islamic institution of learning in India
- Masjid Al Islah, Singapore, a mosque

== Politics ==
- Al-Islah (Yemen), or the Yemeni Congregation for Reform, a political party in Yemen
- Al Islah (United Arab Emirates), Islamist group based in the United Arab Emirates that is affiliated with the Muslim Brotherhood
- Egyptian Reform Party, or Hizb Al-Islah, also known as Egyptian Reform Party, a Salafi political party in Egypt
- Movement for National Reform (Harakat Al-Islah Al-Wataniy), moderate Islamist political party in Algeria
- El Islah, political party in Mauritania
- Hizb el Islah al Suri, also known as Reform Party of Syria, Syrian lobby group based in the United States that was active in the mid to late 2000s
- Hizb Al-Islah wa Al-Tanmiyah, also known as Reform and Development Party (Egypt), an Egyptian liberal political party
- National Reform Trend, Iraqi political party

== Sports ==
- Al Islah Al Bourj Al Shimaly, football and sports club in Lebanon

== Music ==
- Islah (album), debut studio album by American rapper Kevin Gates.

== Media ==
- Al-Islah (newspaper), a weekly newspaper of the Khaksar movement

=== Organizations ===
- Jamaah Islah Malaysia, Malaysian NGO
