= Zafaranlu =

Kurdish tribe in Khorasan

The Zafaranlu or Zaʿfarānlu (Persian: زعفرانلو) are the largest Kurdish tribe in Khorasan, living near the Turkmenistan border. The tribe is composed of several branches or clans. The tribe historically spoke Kurmanji Kurdish; however, due to mixing with Turkmens, the Zafaranlu mainly speak Turkic languages.

== Origins ==
The Zafaranlu tribe were of Çemişgezek origin, and were also present in Iranian Kurdistan. Zafaranlu were loyal to the Safavids, and participated on their side in the Ottoman–Safavid War (1532–1555). They were first settled by the Safavids around Varamin in 1597-1598. However, Shah Abbas I moved the tribe to Khorasan to defend the region from Uzbek-Turcoman raids and incursions.

== Zafaranlu principality in Khorasan ==
Zafaranlu Principality
- 1600–1922
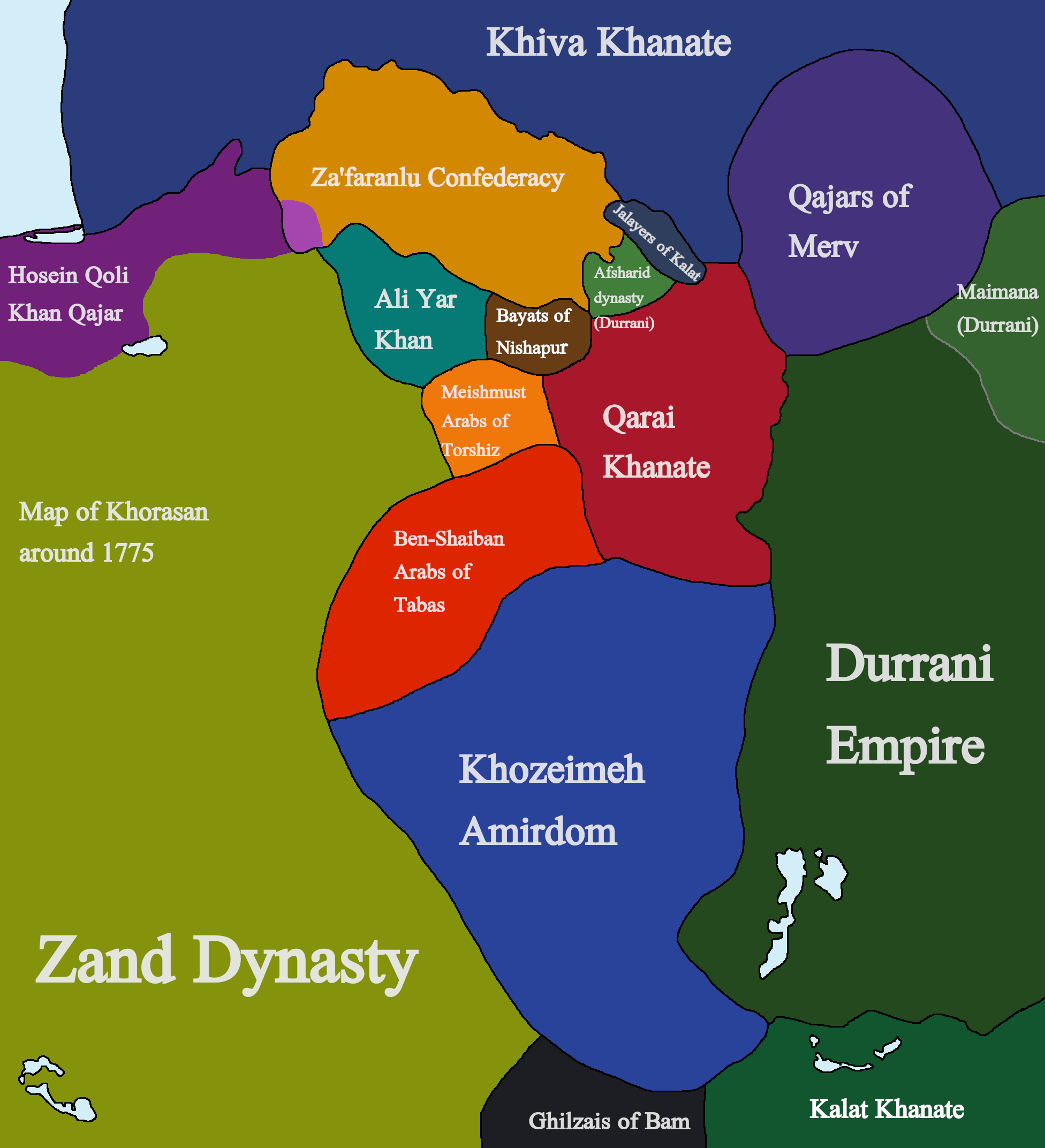
- Zafaranlu principality (in yellow) in 1775AD
- Capital: Quchan
- Religion: Shia Islam
- Government: hereditary
- History
  - Established: 1600
  - Disestablished: 1922
Preceded by	Succeeded by
Turkic tribes	Pahlavi Iran

Arriving in Khorasan around 1600CE, the Zafaranlu first settled in a region located in the Atrak river valley. The Zafaranlu took control over Qushan, Bojnourd and Ahal in the Khorasan region, during the reign of Shah Abbas I. They displaced the Gerayli tribe from the region. As the Zafaranlu chief, Yusuf Khan Chamshgzaklu was the ruler of Quchan.

In the beginning of the 18th century, the Zafaranlu moved into a mountainous region south of the Atrak, due to being less exposed to attacks from Turkic tribes beyond the Iranian border. In the early 18th century, they occupied the lands from Razabad to Chenaran. The Zafaranlu had a large population in Khorasan; along with other Kurdish tribes of Khorasan, they provided 12,000 horsemen to the Persian government.

During the fall of the Safavid Empire, Muhammad Husayn Khan, the Zafaranlu chief and ruler of Qushan, fought against Nader Quli several times. However, he was forced to submit to Nader's authority. Nader Shah married Husayn Khan's sister. In 1727-1728, Husayn Khan rebelled against Nader's rule but was forced to submit again. In 1746, Muhammad Husayn Khan rebelled yet again against Nader's rule, due to heavy taxation. While on his way to crush the rebellion, Nader Shah was assassinated by his own generals in his camp. After Nader's death, the Zafaranlu joined the service of Shah Rukh Afshar. In 1770-1771, Husayn Khan participated in several battles against the Afghan army led by Ahmad Shah Durrani, who were invading Khorasan.

The Zafaranlu principality was dissolved by the Pahlavi regime in 1922.

=== Pahlavi era ===
According to a military report, in 1929, there was around 50,000 Zafaranlu living in Qushan district, 12,000 in Shirvan district, while around 13,000 were still nomads.

== Sources ==
- Qassabi-Nejad, Ali Pur Safar (2016). "Zafaranlu". Encyclopaedia of the World of Islam (in Persian). Vol. 21. Encyclopaedia Islamica Foundation. ISBN 9789644470127.
- Pierre Oberling (2008). "KHORASAN i. ETHNIC GROUPS". In Yarshater, Ehsan (ed.). Encyclopædia Iranica. London and New York: Routledge & Kegan Paul.
