= Miriam Cooke =

American academic

miriam cooke
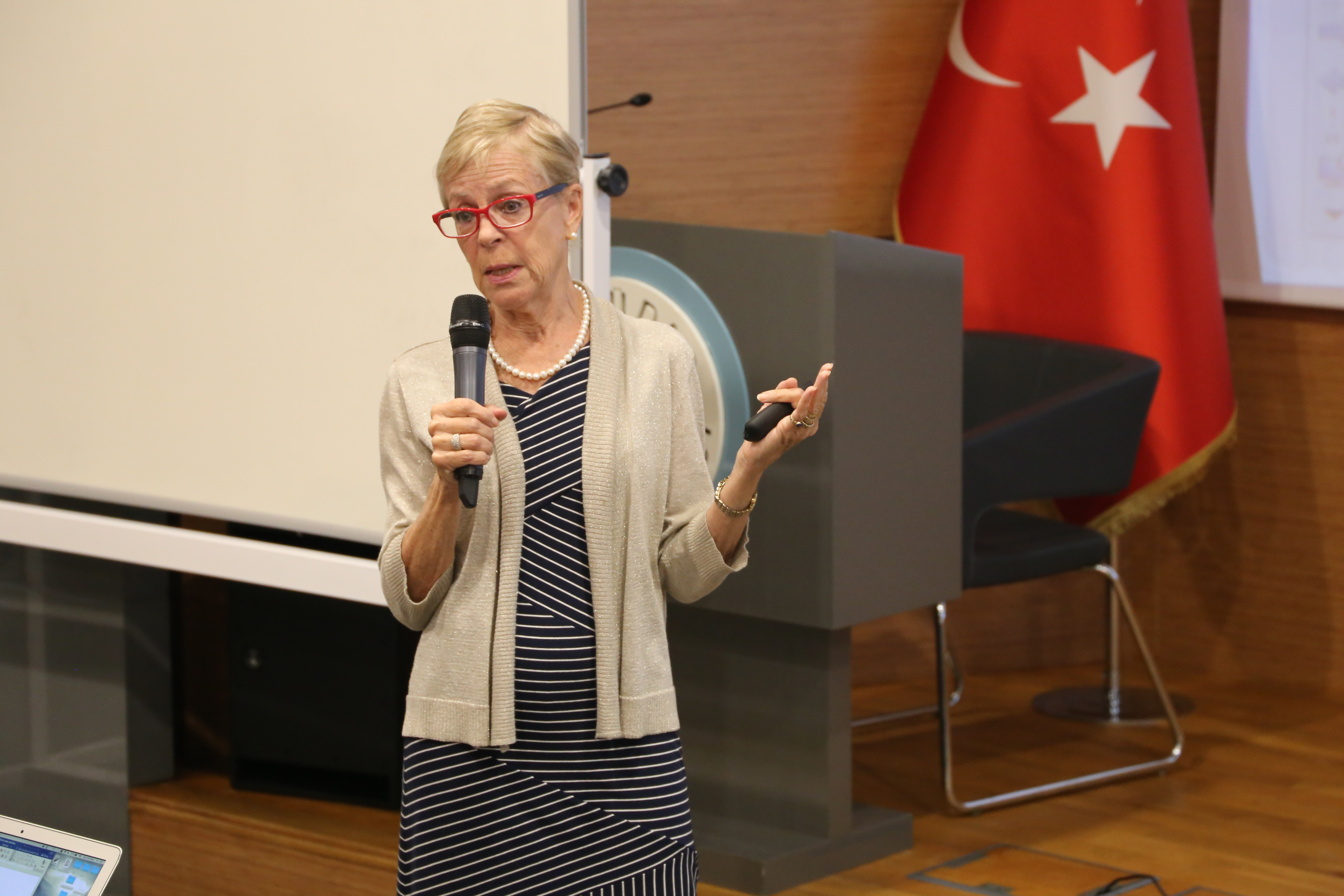

Academic background
- Education: St Antony's College, Oxford

Academic work
- Institutions: Duke University
- Main interests: Middle Eastern and Arab world studies

miriam cooke (she spells her name in lowercase) is an American academic in Middle Eastern and Arab world studies. She focuses on modern Arabic literature and critical reassessment of women's roles in the public sphere.

== Biography ==
She was educated in the United Kingdom, and is co-editor of the Journal of Middle East Women's Studies. She has published over 100 articles and 130 book reviews.

She is a professor of modern Arabic literature and culture at Duke University. She received her doctorate from St Antony's College, Oxford in 1980.

== Bibliography ==
=== Non-fiction ===
- Cooke, Miriam (1984). The anatomy of an Egyptian intellectual, Yahya Haqqi. Washington, D.C.: Three Continents Press. ISBN 9780894103964.
- Cooke, Miriam; Badran, Margot (1990). Opening the gates: a century of Arab feminist writing. Bloomington: Indiana University Press. ISBN 9781853810312.
- Cooke, Miriam (1996). War's other voices: women writers on the Lebanese civil war. Syracuse, New York: Syracuse University Press. ISBN 9780815603771.
- Cooke, Miriam (1996). Women and the war story. Berkeley: University of California Press. ISBN 9780520206137.
- Cooke, Miriam (2001). Women claim Islam: creating Islamic feminism through literature. New York: Routledge. ISBN 9780415925549.
- Cooke, Miriam (2007). Dissident Syria: making oppositional arts official. Durham: Duke University Press. ISBN 9780822340355.
- Cooke, Miriam (2010). Nazira Zeineddine: Biography of an Islamic Feminist Pioneer. Oxford: Oneworld. ISBN 978-1-85168-769-5.
- Cooke, Miriam (2014). Tribal Modern: Branding New Nations in the Arab Gulf. Berkeley, CA: University of California Press. ISBN 9780520280106.
- Cooke, Miriam (2017). Dancing in Damascus: Creativity, Resilience and the Syrian Revolution. New York: Routledge. ISBN 9781138692176.

=== Fiction ===
- Cooke, Miriam (2000). Hayati, my life: a novel. Syracuse, New York: Syracuse University Press. ISBN 9780815606710.
