= The Story of the Daughters of Quchan =

1998 book by Afsaneh Najmabadi

- Author: Afsaneh Najmabadi
- Genre: Political History
- Publication date: 1998
- ISBN: 978-0815627913

The Story of the Daughters of Quchan: Gender and National Memory in Iranian History is a 1998 political history book written by Afsaneh Najmabadi, about a 1905 occurrence of human trafficking in Iran. The titular Daughters of Quchan were a group of about 250 girls from the district of Quchan, who were kidnapped and sold by the local government in lieu of a tax.

== Synopsis ==
Najmabadi presents the event as an example of one of the many acts by both the provincial governments and the national Qajar Regime which led to the Constitutional Revolution. In the province of Quchan, the provincial governor, Asaf al-Dawlah, set a flat tax for all citizens, regardless of their income. The poor could not afford to pay this tax, due to a bad harvest, and the only way they could raise the money was to sell their daughters to the elite Turkmen or to nomads. Turkmen also began raiding the village and capturing the women. When the citizens begged for payment postponement, they were shot and killed by provincial government officials.

About 250 girls were sold, and they became known as the Daughters of Quchan. According to Najmabadi, the incident symbolises how Iranian women were viewed as "objects of traffic" and exemplifies the poverty and social injustice facing people under that government. The people of Quchan went to the central government to protest and ask for help. Finally an investigator was sent to Quchan, who was bribed by the provincial governor, and did not report the true events to the central government. The citizens went back to the central government again to protest and eventually the issue was resolved. This story was published in newspapers across Iran and caused a public demand for social justice and a parliamentary government.

According to Najmabadi, the episode also showed how effective newspapers were at relaying information across the country, as many Iranians sympathized for those in Quchan and would join the campaign for a constitutional government. Asaf al-Dawlah and many of his high-ranking officials were put on trial under the new regime in 1906 and there were multiple efforts made to get the girls back from the Turkmens. While some girls were rescued and brought back to their families, the majority of girls were not found.
