= Afsaneh Najmabadi =

Iranian-American historian and gender studies academic

- افسانه نجم‌آبادی
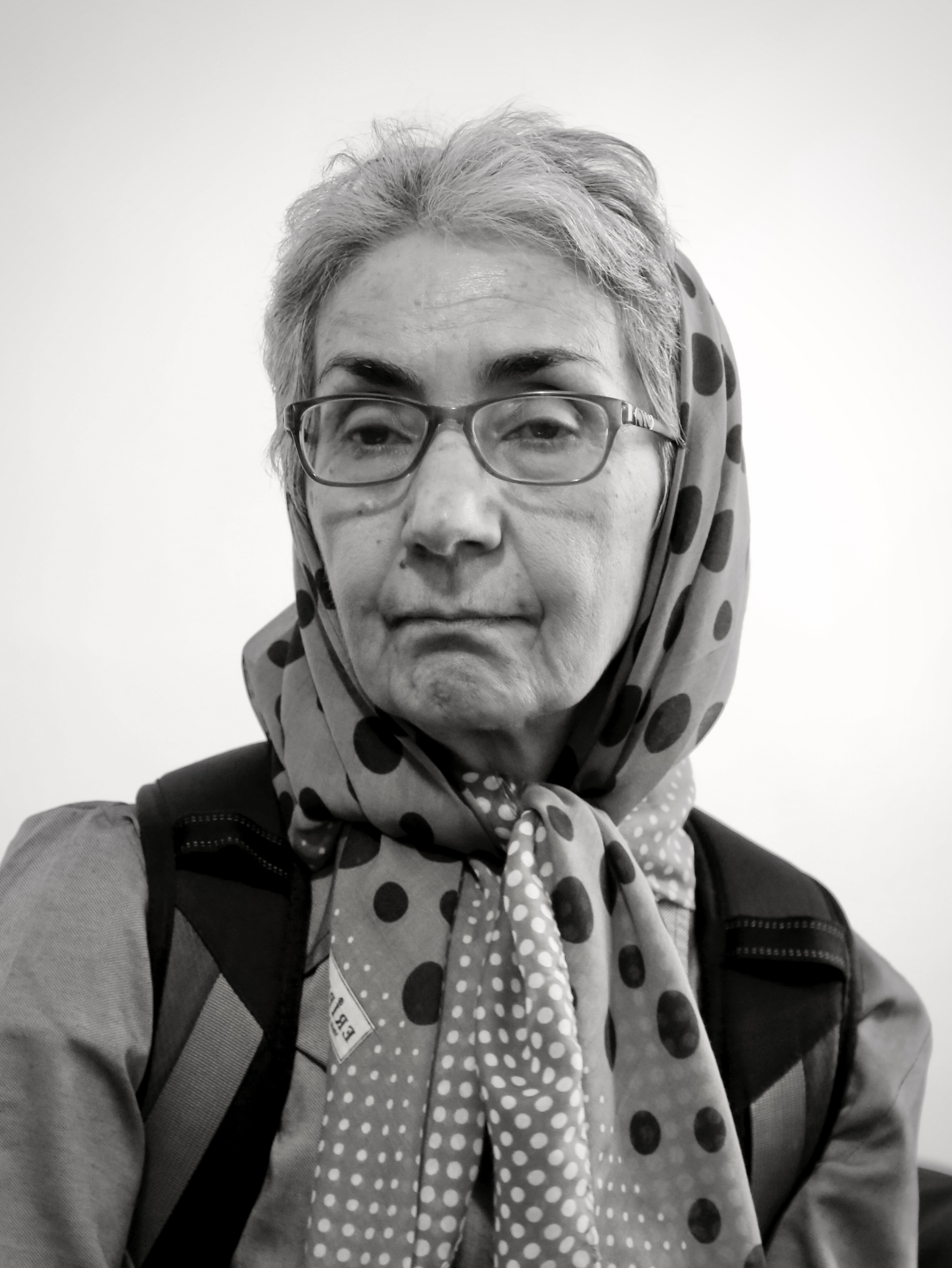
- Najmabadi in Evaz, 2016
- Born: 29 December 1946 (age 79); Iran
- Other names: Afsāneh Najmābādi, Afsānah Najmʹābādī
- Spouse: Kanan Makiya (divorced)

Academic background
- Education: Harvard University; University of Manchester
- Thesis: Land Reform and Development of Agriculture in Iran (1984)

Academic work
- Discipline: Women's studies
- Sub-discipline: Gender history
- Institutions: Harvard University; Barnard College; Wellesley College

Afsaneh Najmabadi (Persian: افسانه نجم‌آبادی; born 29 December 1946) is an Iranian-born American historian, gender studies academic, archivist, and educator. She is the Francis Lee Higginson Professor of History and of Studies of Women, Gender, and Sexuality at Harvard University.

== Biography ==
Afsaneh Najmabadi was born on December 29, 1946, in Iran. She started as a student at University of Tehran.

She moved to Radcliffe College in the United States in 1966. She obtained her BA in physics in 1968 from Radcliffe College, Harvard University, and her MA in physics in 1970 from Harvard University. Following this, she pursued social studies, combining academic interests with engagement in social activism, first in the United States and later in Iran.

She obtained her PhD in sociology in 1984 from the University of Manchester, United Kingdom.

== Career ==
Professor Najmabadi has been Nemazee Fellow at the Center for Middle Eastern Studies, Harvard University (1984–1985), Fellow at Pembroke Center for Teaching and Research on Women, Brown University (1988–1989), at Harvard Divinity School (Women's Studies in Religion Program) (1988–1989), at Institute for Advanced Study in Princeton, New Jersey (1994–1995), and at the Radcliffe Institute for Advanced Study, Harvard University (2000–2001). After nine years of teaching and research at the Department of Women's Studies of Barnard College, in July 2001 she joined Harvard University as Professor of History and of Women's Studies. At present she chairs the Committee on Degrees in Studies of Women, Gender, and Sexuality. Under her tenure as chair, the Committee on Degrees in Women's Studies changed its name to the Committee on Degrees in Studies of Women, Gender, and Sexuality.

Najmabadi is also Associate Editor of Encyclopaedia of Women and Islamic Cultures, in six volumes.

Professor Najmabadi's most recent research has been concerned with the study of the ways in which concepts and practices of sex and sexuality have transformed in Iran, from the late-nineteenth-century to the present-day Iran.

Najmabadi leads a digital archive and website, Women’s Worlds in Qajar Iran. The project was awarded its third two-year grant from the National Endowment for the Humanities, and it was recognized by the White House Office of Public Engagement in May 2012.

In Najmabadi's publication Beyond the Americas: Are Gender and Sexuality Useful Categories of Historical Analysis? Najmabadi problematizes the categories of sex and gender for analyzing texts outside Western societies. Within the historical context in other parts of the world, (in her case study, Iran) thinking of gender-based solely on the binary of man/woman masculine/feminine is a concept that was imposed by Victorian values in Modern times. (examples from Iran). This led her to some questions which are as follows: Are gender and sexuality useful categories analyzing beyond the modern? (For those studying beyond the Americas) How have we had to renegotiate meanings of gender and sexuality as well as their analytic utility? Acknowledging the largely Anglo-American history of gender as a name category, in the particular burden of birth in connection with psycho-behavioral categories of gender role determination, how have we reckoned with the many effects of that genealogy? Have we really done away with gender binaries in our historical and analytical work?. How do we approach the problem of gender’s historical narrative effect for its own production as a binary? To the extent that we continue to narratively reproduce gender binaries are we not naturalizing and by indication attemporalizing gender despite our best intention? The dichotomy between masculinity and femininity. Allocating certain traits to muscularity and anything outside that is effeminate. With these, there is no room for gender fluidity. She also recognizes the effect of colonialism on these, and its rigid view on gender.

Also in her journal “Veiled Discourse, Unveiled Bodies” Afsaneh Najmabadi talks about how modern and counter modern discourses formed around “the Woman Question”. The Iranian modernist discourses and Islamic counter discourses, in their respective narratives of "the Woman Question," share a language of loss. Iranian modernism scripts a loss of chains of female enslavement, the Islamicist response scripts the same historical moment as loss of Islamic virtue. In the modernist imagination, the premodern woman is envisaged as absent from the public, silent from the print. Modernity is to have transformed these absences into her unveiled public presence and her printed words. The Islamic counter discourse, on the other hand, sees the modern transformations symbolized by the loss of Islamic identity of the female (and of the community), through the absence of her Islamic marker, her veil. This project of producing a new verbal and bodily language and new rules for intercourse suited the heterosocial space and was of course not limited to women. Men also needed to be reeducated, modern men newly crafted. This process was not gender blind. The public space was a male space unto which the modern woman was to make an entry.

== Political activities ==
In 1991, she supported the U.S. invasion of Iraq and harshly attacked Edward Said for criticizing the attack, describing his view as the "rhetorical equivalent of political murder".

== Publications ==
- Afsaneh Najmabadi, Land Reform and Social Change in Iran, 246 p. (University of Utah Press, Salt Lake City, 1987). ISBN 0-87480-285-7
- Afsaneh Najmabadi, Women's Autobiography in Contemporary Iran, 78 p., Harvard Middle Eastern Monographs (Harvard University Press, 1991). ISBN 0-932885-05-5
- Afsaneh Najmabadi, editor, Bibi Khanum Astarabadi's Ma'ayib al-Rijal: Vices of Men (Midland Printers, Chicago, 1992).
- Afsaneh Najmabadi, The Story of the Daughters of Quchan: Gender and National Memory in Iranian History, 232 p., Modern Intellectual and Political History of the Middle East (Syracuse University Press, 1998). ISBN 0-8156-2791-2
- Afsaneh Najmabadi, Crafting an Educated Housewife in Iran, in Remaking Women: Feminism and Modernity in the Middle East, Chapter 3, pp. 91–125, edited by Lila Abu-Lughod, 314 p. (Princeton University Press, 1998). ISBN 0-691-05792-3
- Afsaneh Najmabadi, The Morning After: Travails of Sexuality and Love in Modern Iran, International Journal of Middle East Studies, Vol. 36, pp. 367–385 (Cambridge University Press, 2004).
- Afsaneh Najmabadi, Women with Mustaches and Men without Beards: Gender and Sexual Anxieties of Iranian Modernity, 377 p. (University of California Press, Berkeley, 2005). ISBN 0-520-24262-9
- Afsaneh Najmabadi, Professing Selves: Transsexuality and Same-Sex Desire in Contemporary Iran, 450 p. (Duke University Press, 2013). ISBN 978-0-8223-5557-1
- Suad Joseph, and Afsaneh Najmabadi, editors, Family, Law and Politics, Encyclopaedia of Women and Islamic Cultures, 837 p. (Brill Academic Publishers, 2005). ISBN 90-04-12818-2
- Suad Joseph, and Afsaneh Najmabadi, editors, Family, Body, Sexuality and Health, Encyclopaedia of Women and Islamic Cultures, Vol. 3, 588 p. (Brill Academic Publishers, 2005). ISBN 90-04-12819-0
- Suad Joseph, Afsaneh Najmabadi, Julie Peteet, Seteney Shami, and Jacqueline Siapo, editors, Economics, Education, Mobility and Space, Encyclopaedia of Women and Islamic Cultures, 587 p. (Brill Academic Publications, 2006). ISBN 90-04-12820-4
- Suad Joseph, Afsaneh Najmabadi, Julie Peteet, Seteney Shami, and Jacqueline Siapno, editors, Practices, Interpretations and Representations, Encyclopaedia of Women and Islamic Cultures, 594 p. (Brill Academic Publishers, 2007). ISBN 90-04-12821-2
