= Islah Jad =

Palestinian academic (born 1951)

- إصلاح جاد
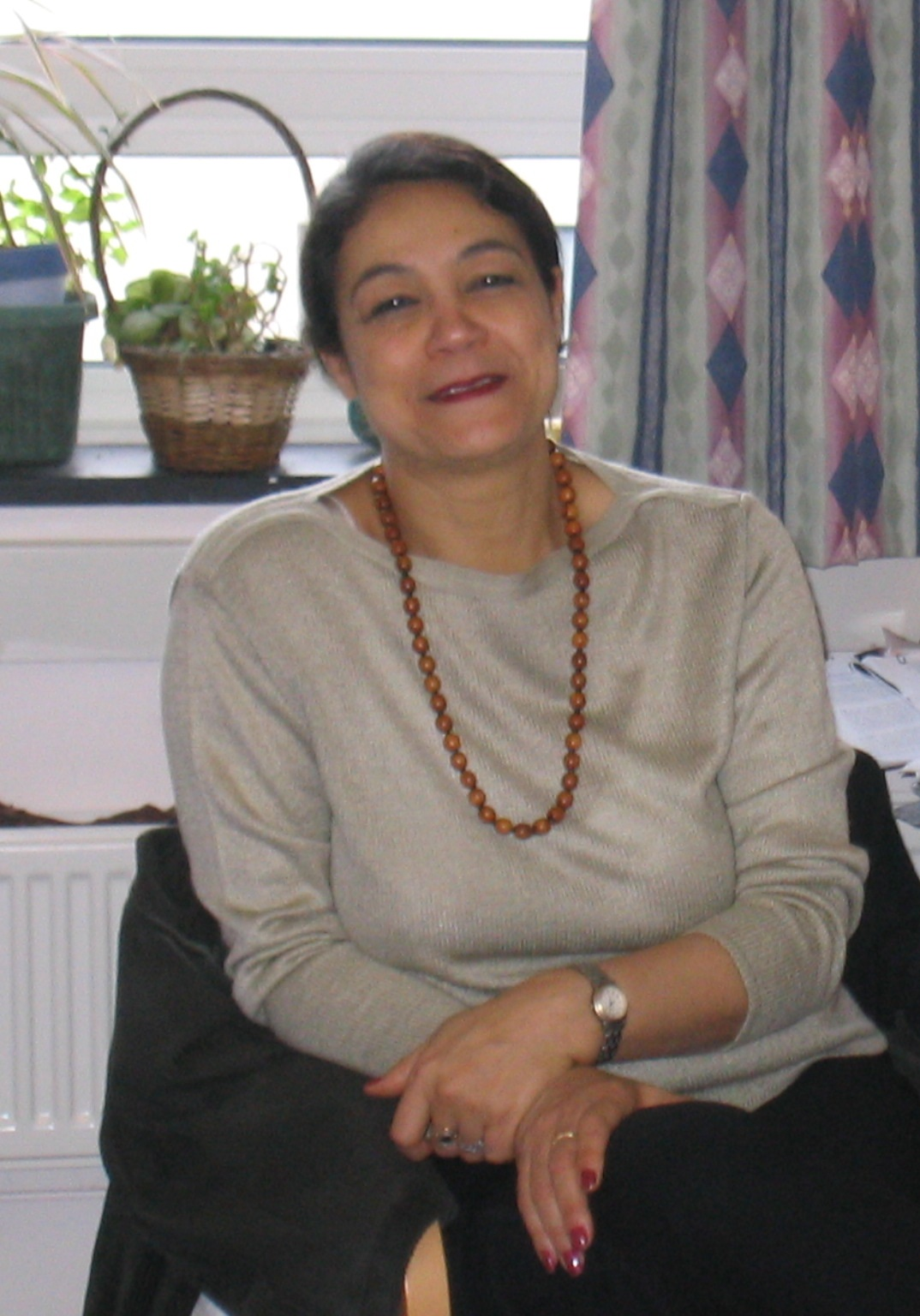
- Born: December 4, 1951 (age 74); Cairo, Egypt
- Education: Cairo University (bachelor's); University of Nantes (master's); University of London (Ph.D)
- Occupation: teaching
- Employer: Birzeit University
- Organizations: Arab Families Working Group; Institute of Women's Studies, Birzeit
- Movement: feminism
- Children: 3

Islah Jad (born 1951) is a tenured assistant professor of Gender and Development at Birzeit University. She is also the co-founder and current Director of the Institute of Women's Studies at Birzeit and a Core Group Member of the Arab Families Working Group. A prominent figure in the Palestinian women's movement, Jad also helped to establish the Women's Affair Centre in Gaza and Nablus, Les Amies du Francis, the Child Corner project in el-Bireh, and the WATC (Women's Affairs Technical Committee). Jad carried out Gender Consultancy for the United Nations Development Programme and was a co-author of the United Nations' Arab Human Development Report of 2005. She earned a bachelor's degree in political science from Cairo University, a master's degree in political theory from the University of Nantes, and a Ph.D. in gender and development studies from the University of London.

WATC was established in 1992 in Ramallah, West Bank.

== Selected publications ==
- Jad, Islah. 2005. "Islamist Women of Hamas: A New Women's Movement?" In On Shifting Ground; Muslim Women in a Global Era, edited by Fereshteh Nouraie-Simone. New York: The Feminist Press.
- UNDP. Jad, Islah (core team member) and others. 2006. Arab Human Development Report, 2005: Women's Empowerment. New York: UNDP.
- Jad, Islah. 2005–2006. "Letters from Ramallah." Bahithat 11: 206–226.
- −−−. Jad, Islah (August 2007). "Re-reading the British mandate in Palestine: gender and the urban rural divide through health care and education". International Journal of Middle East Studies. 39 (3): 338–342. doi:10.1017/S002074380707047X. S2CID 161308092.
- −−−. Jad, Islah (August 2007). "NGOs: Between buzzwords and social movements". Development in Practice. 17 (4–5): 622–629. doi:10.1080/09614520701469781. S2CID 144027087.
- −−−. Women at the cross-roads: the Palestinian women's movement between nationalism, secularism and Islamism (Ph.D.). SOAS, University of London. 2008.
- −−−. PCBS, ed. (2008), "Women and public life", Men and Women Report (PDF) (in Arabic), Ramallah, Palestine: Palestinian Central Bureau of Statistics (PCBS).
- −−−. Jad, Islah (Fall 2009). "The politics of group weddings in Palestine: political and gender tensions". Journal of Middle East Women's Studies. 5 (3): 36–53. doi:10.2979/mew.2009.5.3.36. JSTOR 10.2979/mew.2009.5.3.36. S2CID 145529800.
- −−−. Al–Ali, Feryal, ed. (2010), "Reflections on the Arab Human Development Report on the empowerment of women in the Arab world", Arab women: future perspectives (in Arabic), Amman, Jordan: Arab Thought Forum.
- −−−. Rubenberg, Cheryl A., ed. (2010), "Islamic Jihad", Encyclopedia of the Israeli-Palestinian Conflict, Boulder, Colorado: Lynne Rienner Publishers, ISBN 9781588266866.
- −−−. Jad, Islah (August 2010). "The conundrums of post-Oslo Palestine: gendering Palestinian citizenship". Feminist Theory. 11 (2): 149–169. doi:10.1177/1464700110366809. S2CID 143673217.
- −−−. Jad, Islah (June 2011). "Islamist women of Hamas: between feminism and nationalism". Inter-Asia Cultural Studies. 12 (2): 176–201. doi:10.1080/14649373.2011.554647. S2CID 144924736.
- Jad, Islah. 2020. "NGOs: Between Buzzwords and Social Movements." In Women's Grassroots Mobilization in the MENA Region Post-2011 (Kelsey Norman, ed.).Baker Institute (Houston, TX). 28 June 2020. https://doi.org/10.25613/j0tx-w723

== See also ==
- Diaspora studies
- Women in Islam
- Palestine
- Women's studies
- Gender studies
- Transnationalism
- Development studies
- Rula Hassanein
