= Encyclopedia of Women and Islamic Cultures =

Reference work on gender studies and the Islamic world

- Author: Suad Joseph (Editor)
- Language: English
- Subject: Gender Studies, Islamic Cultures
- Genre: Reference
- Publisher: Brill
- Publication date: 2003-2007 (Volumes 1-6), 2010-2020 (Supplement)
- Media type: Print, Online

The Encyclopedia of Women and Islamic Cultures (EWIC) is a reference work on gender studies and the Islamic world. The EWIC project was founded by Suad Joseph who is its general editor. EWIC is aimed at becoming "an essential reference work for students and researchers in the fields of gender studies, Middle Eastern and Islamic studies, as well as scholars of religion, history, politics, anthropology, geography and related disciplines." EWIC examines the experiences of Muslim women globally as well as non-Muslim women in Islamic societies.

The encyclopedia consists of six volumes in English and is the result of collaboration of over 1,000 scholars from around the world. The EWIC print version was published between 2003 and 2007, and includes 1,246 articles written by over one thousand scholars from around the world, covering 410 topics. EWIC is also available as a digital, searchable database EWIC Online: Brill that includes all six EWIC print volumes, as well as two annual online supplements, adding 50 to 60 scholarly articles to the index each year.

EWIC is the only encyclopedia that brings together research on women and Islamic cultures, in all humanities and social sciences disciplines, covering all topics for which scholarship can be found. EWIC works to survey all facets of life (art, music, literature, languages, film, dance, folklore, religious thought and practices, family systems, education, politics, economy, science, health, environment, and so forth) of women in cultures where Islam has played a significant role. EWIC challenges the misrepresentation of women in Islamic societies and Muslim women around the world by publishing rigorous, original evidence-based research that is historically and culturally situated, and making it all available as an accessible digital resource.

== See also ==
- Encyclopaedia of Islam
- Encyclopaedia of the Qur'an
