= Quchan University of Technology =

Coordinates: 37.0702023°N 58.5372421°E

- دانشگاه صنعتی قوچان; Daneshgah-e Sanati-e Quchan
- Type: Public
- Established: 2006
- Chancellor: Dr. Majid Mahdavian
- Academic staff: 70
- Students: 2,700(in 2018)
- Location: 5th km of Quchan-Mashhad road, Quchan, Iran
- Campus: Urban
- Website: qiet.ac.ir

The Quchan University of Technology (Persian: دانشگاه صنعتی قوچان) is a state university located in Quchan, Iran. Established in 2006, it was formerly named Technical Institute of Engineering.

== History ==
The Quchan University of Technology was founded at first as a technical college in 2007. It began its activities in January 2007 with 70 students of Computer Engineering and Telecommunications. It converted to Higher Education Complexes of Engineering of Quchan in 2009. In 2013 the Quchan University of Technology was confirmed by the Ministry of Science, Research, and Technology of Iran.The Quchan University of Technology has more than 3000 students with 65 scientific boards.

== Colleges ==
There are seven colleges of the Quchan University.

- Faculty Of Engineering
  - Department of Chemical and Energy Engineering
  - Department of Civil Engineering
  - Department of Mathematics
  - Department of Mechanical and Industrial Engineering
  - Faculty Of Electrical and Computer Engineering
- Faculty Of Electrical and Computer Engineering
  - Department of Computer Engineering
  - Department of Electrical Engineering

== Picture Gallery ==
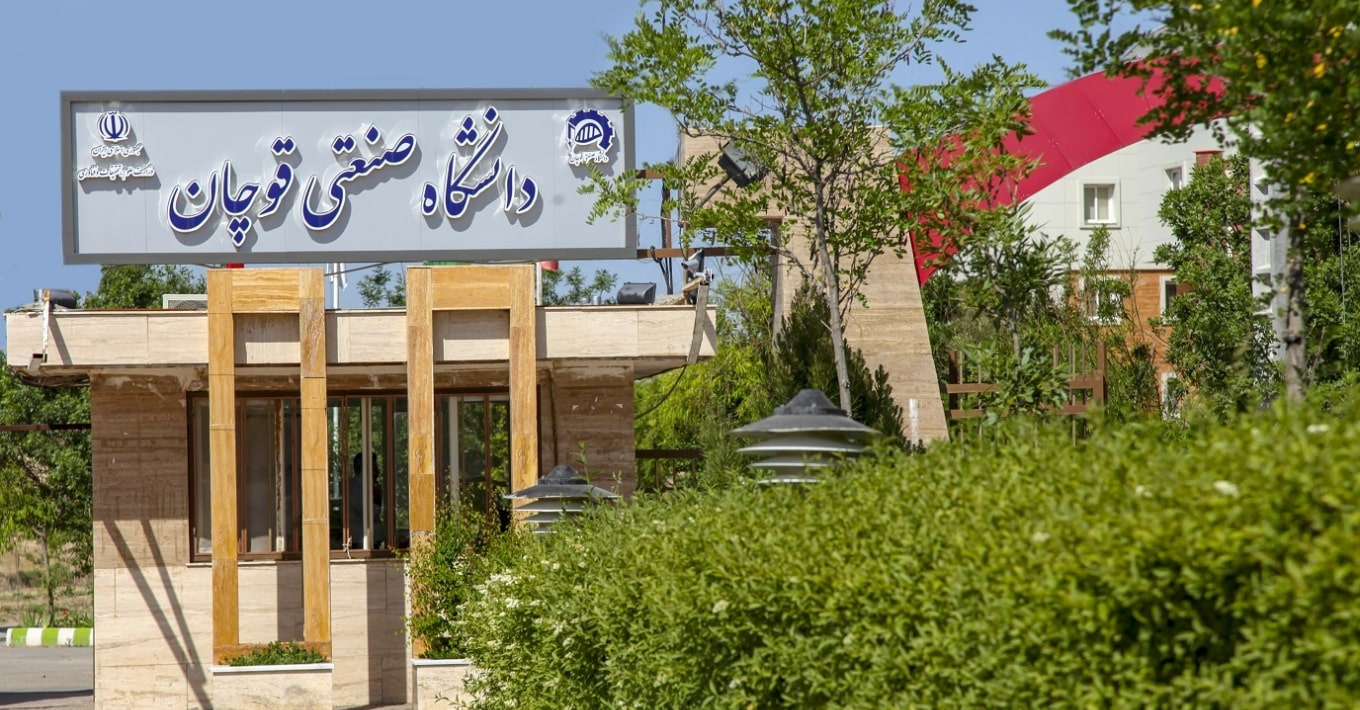
Quchan University Gateway

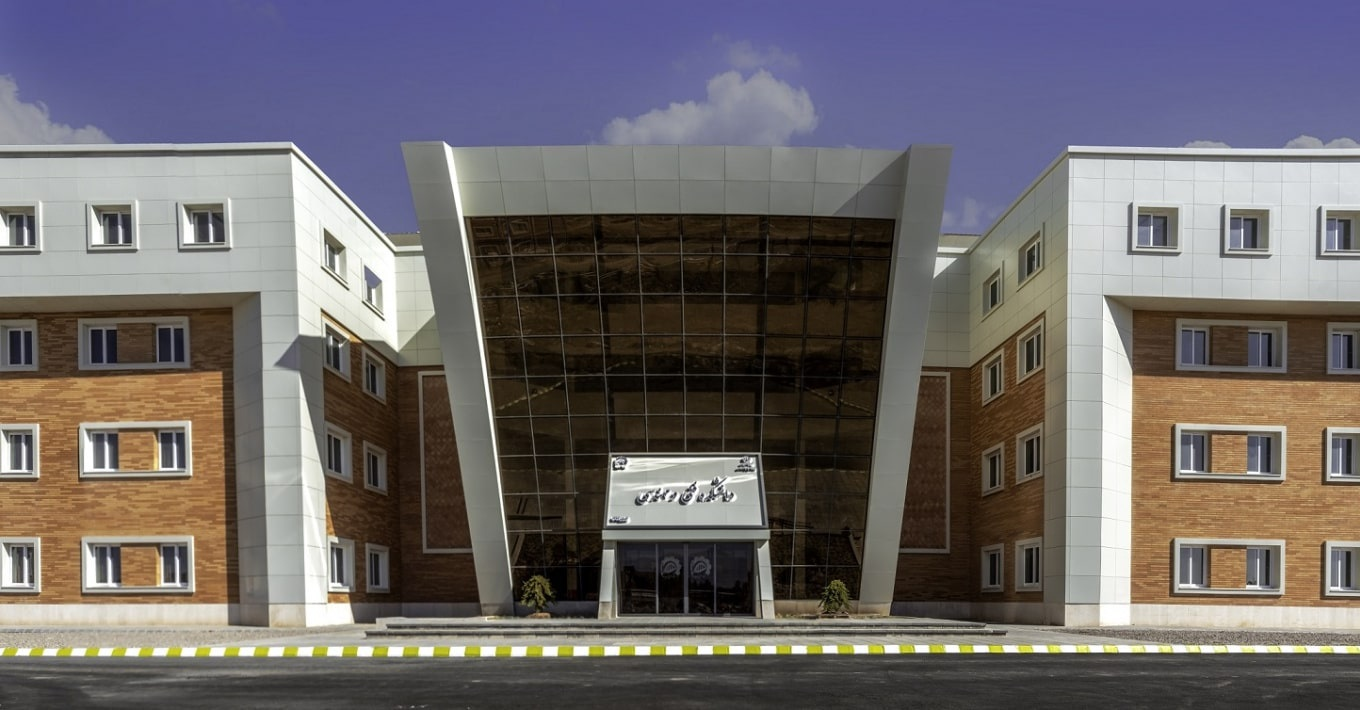
Faculty Of Electrical and Computer Engineering

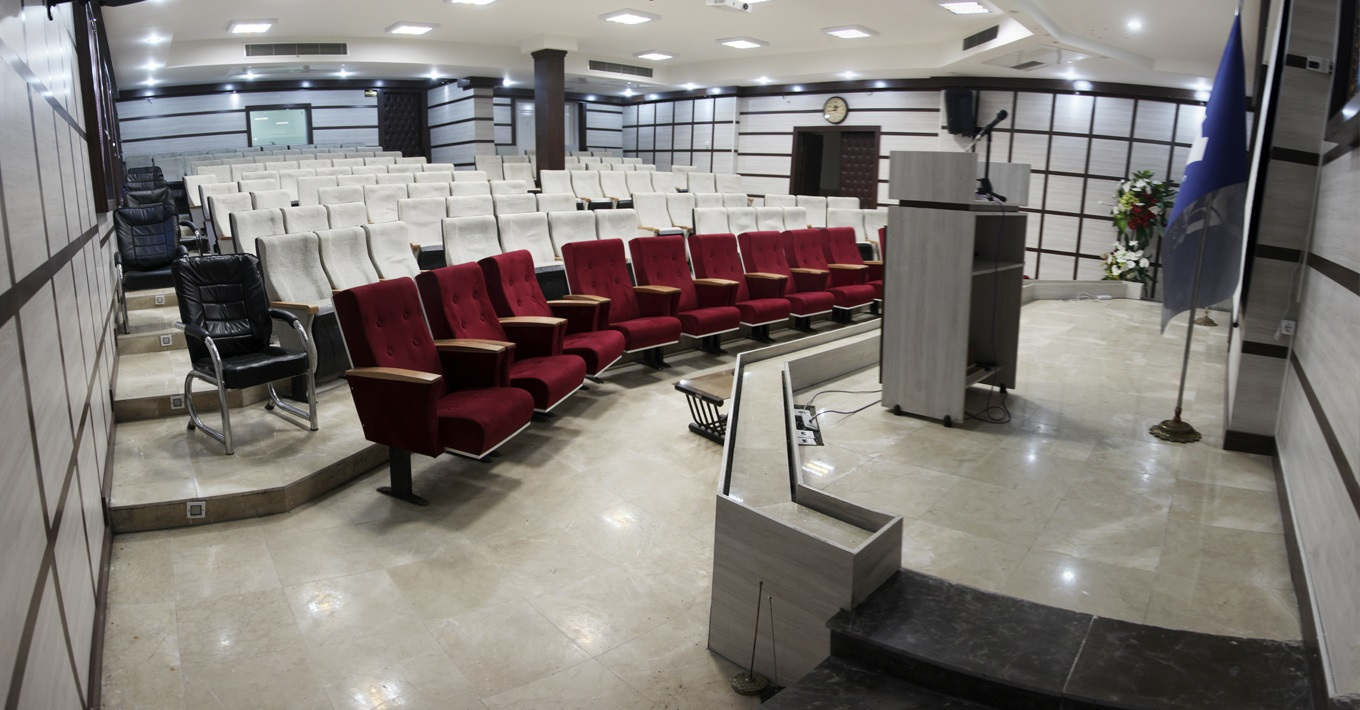
Quchan University Conference hall
