= Behrouz Javid-Tehrani =

Iranian student (born 1978)

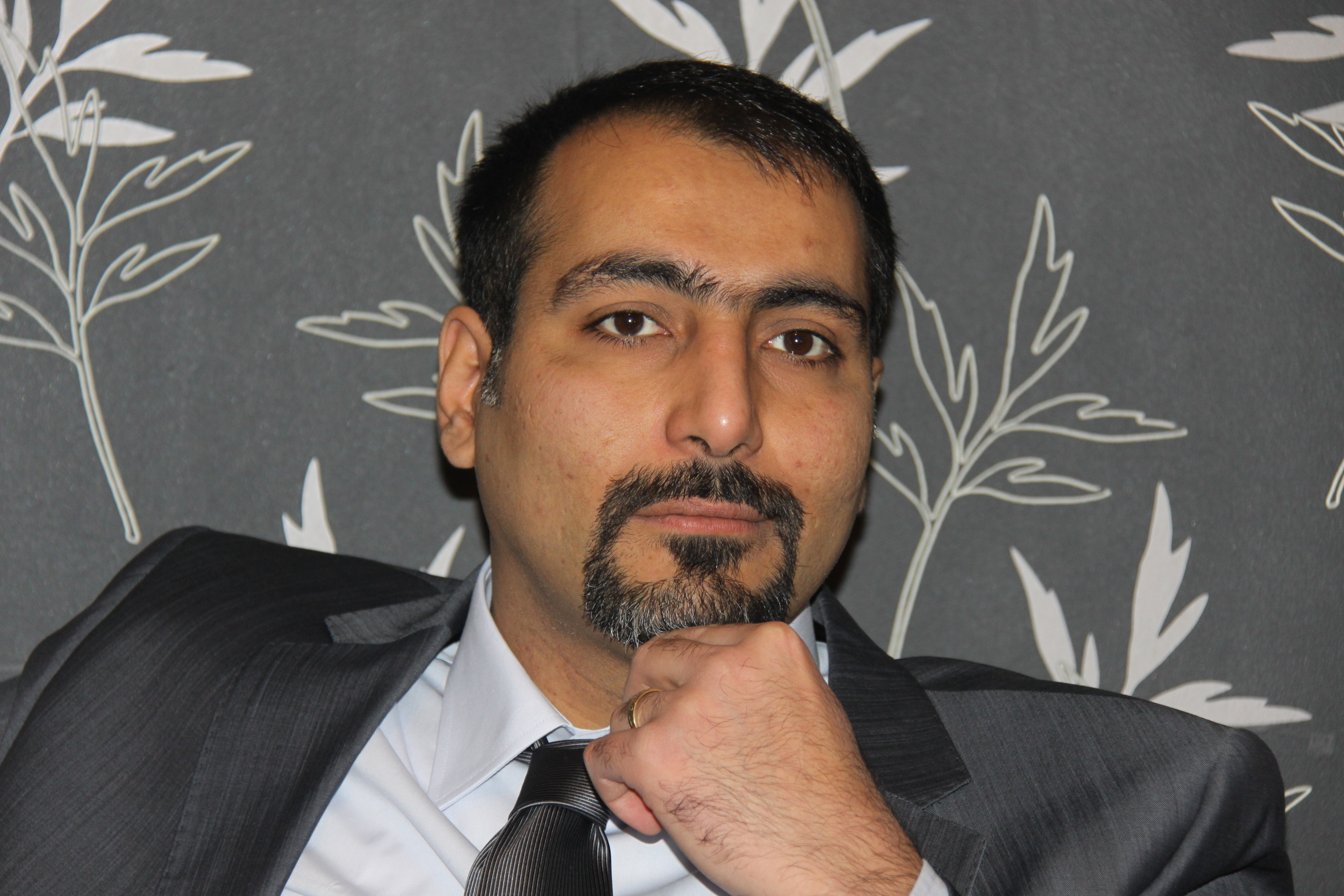
- Born: December 26, 1978 (age 47); Iran

Behrouz Javid-Tehrani (Persian: بهروز جاوید تهرانی; born December 26, 1978) is an Iranian student who was first arrested following the Iran student protests of July 1999. As of 2009, he had spent most of the past eleven years in jail, and was in poor health due to torture.

He was first given an eight-year sentence in 1999, which was later commuted to four years. In 2005, he was arrested again and given a four-year prison sentence for "acts against state security", a three-year sentence for belonging to the People's Mujahedin of Iran, and a flogging of seventy four lashes for "insulting the leadership and the state".

A 2006 independent medical examination concluded that he had been tortured while in prison. In 2009, Human Rights Watch expressed concern at his condition and called for his immediate release.
