= Suad Joseph =

American anthropologist

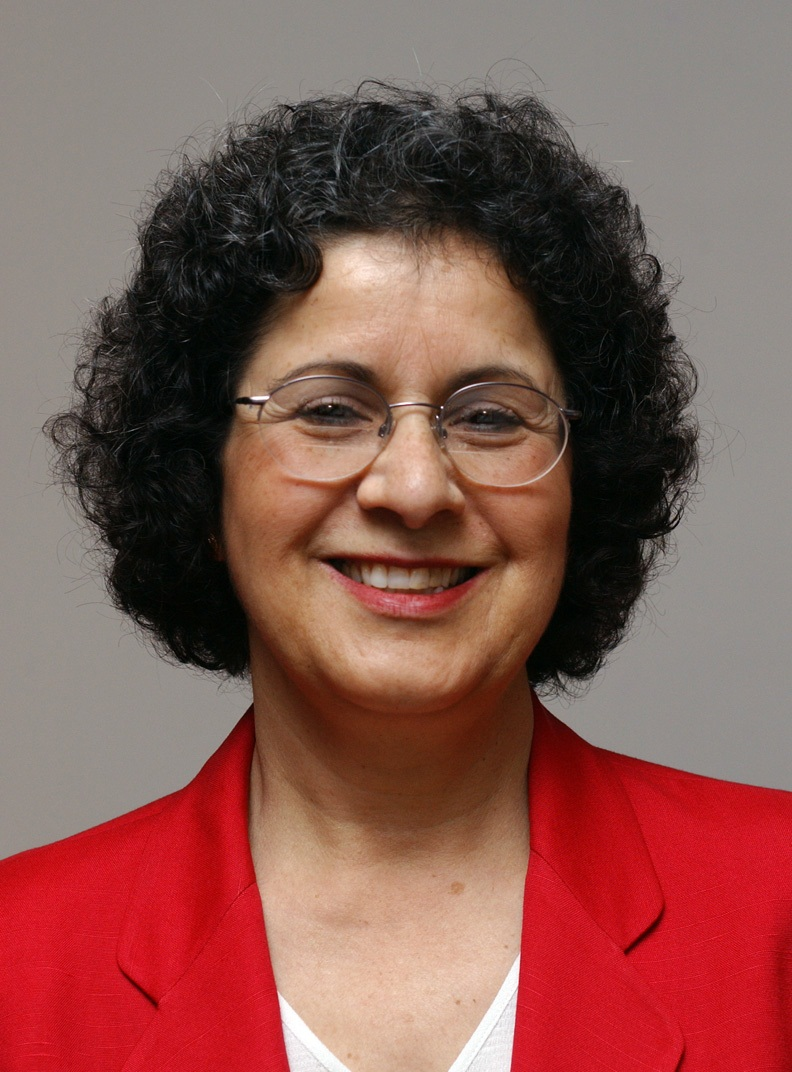
- Dr. Suad Joseph, University of California, Davis
- Born: 6 September 1943 (age 83); Lebanon

Academic background
- Education: Columbia University

Academic work
- Discipline: Anthropologist
- Sub-discipline: Women and Gender Studies
- Institutions: University of California, Davis
- Notable works: Arab Families Working Group, Encyclopedia of Women and Islamic Culture

Suad Joseph (Arabic: سعاد جوزيف; born 6 September 1943) is professor of Anthropology and Women and Gender Studies at the University of California, Davis (UCD) and in 2009 was President of the Middle East Studies Association of North America.

Her research addresses issues of gender; families, children, and youth; sociology of the family; and selfhood, citizenship, and the state in the Middle East, with a focus on her native Lebanon. Joseph is the founder of the Middle East Research Group in Anthropology (now the Middle East Section of the American Anthropological Association), the founder and coordinator of the Arab Families Working Group, the founder of the Association for Middle East Women's Studies, the general editor of the Encyclopedia of Women and Islamic Cultures, and the founding director of the Middle East/South Asian Studies Program at the UCD.

== Early life ==
Joseph was born in Lebanon as the youngest of seven children. Joseph and four brothers and two sisters were taught to put schooling first by their parents who were unskilled laborers. Her mother, Rose Haddad Joseph, was illiterate. Joseph grew up in Cortland, New York, and obtained her bachelor's degree from State University of New York at Cortland. She then went on to complete graduate school, studying anthropology at the University of Pittsburgh and then at Columbia University, where she achieved her doctoral degree in anthropology. She and all six of her siblings went on to achieve advanced degrees. Her earlier work focused on the politicization of religion in Lebanon.

== Arab Families Working Group ==
Joseph founded the Arab Families Working Group (AFWG) in 2001. The organization is an international collective of sixteen scholars whose work focuses on families and youth in Palestine, Lebanon and Egypt and their diasporas. AFWG, in addition to its research, undertakes capacity building to help prepare a new generation of scholars in Palestine, Lebanon, and Egypt; works with NGO's and stakeholders to exchange research findings; and works to transform their research into policy briefs and papers for NGO's and policy makers working with Arab families and youth. They also are committed to translating their relevant works into Arabic to make their findings of use to the local public.

== Encyclopedia of Women and Islamic Cultures ==
Joseph founded the Encyclopedia of Women and Islamic Cultures (EWIC) project and is its general editor. EWIC is a six-volume interdisciplinary, transhistorical encyclopaedia, published between 2002 and 2007, that examines the experiences of Muslim women globally as well as non-Muslim women in Islamic societies.

== American Anthropological Association, ME Section ==
Joseph is the founder of the Middle East Research Group in Anthropology, which later evolved into the Middle East Section (MES) of the American Anthropological Association. MES brings together anthropologists with an interest in the peoples, cultures, and histories of the Middle East. Its membership is international, composed of anthropologists from diverse subdisciplines including sociocultural anthropology, medical anthropology, and archeology. As such, according to the website, MES is “uniquely poised to contribute to establishing and promoting public understanding and policy frameworks that accommodate the historical experience and sociocultural diversity of the peoples of the Middle East.” MES scholars convene annually at the conference of the American Anthropological Association.

== Association for Middle East Women's Studies ==
Joseph is the founder of the Association for Middle East Women's Studies (AMEWS) and co-founder of the Journal of Middle East Women's Studies. AMEWS is an organization of scholars and individuals with an interest in women and gender studies in the context of the Middle East, North Africa, including their diasporic communities. AMEWS works to organize and sponsor conferences, workshops and symposia that encourage research and collaboration in these areas. AMEWS is affiliated with the Middle East Studies Association of North America. It produces the Journal of Middle East Women's Studies (JMEWS), which is published triennially by Indiana University Press. According to their website, JMEWS is "a venue for region-specific research informed by transnational feminist, gender, and sexuality scholarship," and encourages editors to submit work "that employs historical, ethnographic, literary, textual, and visual analyses and methodologies."

== Middle East/South Asia Studies Program, UC Davis ==
Joseph is the Founding Director of the Middle East/South Asia Studies Program (ME/SA) at the University of California, Davis (2004–2009). ME/SA meets the growing demand of students for courses to develop their understanding of this critical region. Originally launched as an undergraduate minor program, ME/SA won a substantial grant from the U.S. Department of Education in 2006 enabling it to add new courses including Arabic and Hindi/Urdu instruction, sponsor conferences and lectures, and launch a K-12 teacher training workshop. In the Fall of 2008, ME/SA launched its undergraduate Major, and by 2010, it had 30 affiliated faculty members, 20 teaching faculty members, and offered over 80 courses. By 2011, ME/SA had won an endowment for a Visiting Lecturer from the PARSA Community Foundation to launch Iranian studies. ME/SA will offer a minor in Iranian Studies by 2014. In 2011 ME/SA also won a donor gift to assist in the development of an Arab Studies minor which it also plans to launch by 2014. Joseph led both of these efforts. According to the website, “As the only University of California campus with a minor and major in Middle East/South Asia Studies, UC Davis is a pioneer in the study of the Middle East and South Asia in relationship to each other.”

== Five-university consortium facilitator ==
Joseph is also the founder and facilitator of a five-university consortium of the American University of Beirut, American University in Cairo, Lebanese American University, UCD, and Birzeit University Consortium.

== Honors and awards ==
- 1976–78 Founding President, Middle East Research Group in Anthropology
- 1985–87 Founding President, Association for Middle East Women's Studies
- 1994 Distinguished Alumnus Award. Cortland College Alumni Association. State University of New York, Cortland
- 1997 Pro Femina Research Consortium, Outstanding Mentor Award
- 2003 Lyceum Distinguished Scholar Award. Wichita State University
- 2003 Sabbagh Distinguished Lecturer. University of Arizona
- 2004 Distinguished Scholarly Public Service Award, University of California, Davis
- 2004 Founding Director, Middle East/South Asian Studies Program
- 2009–12 Named Endowed Lecture Series: Suad Joseph Iranian Studies Lecture Series, University of California, Davis
- 2010 Journal of Middle East Women's Studies Distinguished Lecturer, UCLA
- 2010–2011 President, Middle East Studies Association of North America
- 2012 Chancellor's Achievement Award for Diversity and Community by the University of California, Davis.
- 2011–13 President, Arab American Studies Association
- 2014 UC Davis Prize (excellence in teaching award)

== Selected publications ==
=== Encyclopedia ===
- Joseph, Suad, General Ed. 2003–2007. Encyclopedia of Women and Islamic Cultures. 6 vols. Leiden: Brill.
- −−−, General Ed. 2010. Encyclopedia of Women and Islamic Cultures EWIC Online. Supplement I. Leiden: Brill.

=== Edited and co-edited books ===
- Joseph, Suad and Barbara L.K. Pillsbury, eds. 1978. Muslim-Christian Conflicts: Economic, Political and Social Origins. Boulder, CO.: Westview Press.
- Moubarak, Walid, Antoine Messarra, and Suad Joseph, eds. 1999. Building Citizenship in Lebanon. Beirut: Lebanese American University Press. (In Arabic).
- Joseph, Suad, ed. 1999. Intimate Selving in Arab Families: Gender, Self and Identity. Syracuse: Syracuse University Press.
- Hamadeh, Najla, Jean Said Makdisi, and Suad Joseph, eds. 1999. Gender and Citizenship in Lebanon. Beirut: Dar al Jadid Press. (In Arabic).
- Joseph, Suad, ed. 2000. Gender and Citizenship in the Middle East. Syracuse: Syracuse University Press.
- Joseph, Suad and Susan Slyomovics. 2001. Women and Power in the Middle East. Philadelphia: University of Pennsylvania Press.

=== Book chapters ===
- Joseph, Suad (2005), "The kin contract and citizenship in the Middle East", in Friedman, Marilyn (ed.), Women and citizenship, Studies in Feminist Philosophy, Oxford New York: Oxford University Press, pp. 130–145, ISBN 9780195175356.
- Cudd, Ann (5 April 2006). "Women and Citizenship". Notre Dame Philosophical Reviews.
- Joseph, Suad; D’Harlingue, Benjamin; Wong, Ka Hin (2008), "Arab Americans and Muslim Americans in the New York Times, before and after 9/11", in Jamal, Amaney; Naber, Nadine (eds.), Race and Arab Americans before and after 9/11: from invisible citizens to visible subjects, Syracuse, New York: Syracuse University Press, pp. 229–275, ISBN 9780815631774.
- Joseph, Suad (2008), "Familism and critical Arab family studies", in Young, Kathryn; Rashad, Hoda (eds.), Family in the Middle East: ideational change in Egypt, Iran, and Tunisia, London New York: Routledge, pp. 25–39, ISBN 9780415774864.

=== Journal articles ===
- Joseph, Suad (Winter 2005). "Conceiving family relationships in post-war Lebanon". Journal of Comparative Family Studies. 35 (2): 271–293. doi:10.3138/jcfs.35.2.271. JSTOR 41603937.
- Joseph, Suad (Winter 2005). "Learning desire: relational pedagogies and the desiring female subject in Lebanon". Journal of Middle East Women's Studies. 1 (1): 79–109. doi:10.1215/15525864-2005-1005. JSTOR 40326850. S2CID 143451745.
- Joseph, Suad (Fall 2009). "Geographies of Lebanese families: women as transnationals, men as nationals, and other problems with transnationalism". Journal of Middle East Women's Studies. 5 (3): 120–144. doi:10.2979/mew.2009.5.3.120. JSTOR 10.2979/MEW.2009.5.3.120. S2CID 143957572.
- Joseph, Suad (July 2011). "Political familism in Lebanon". The Annals of the American Academy of Political and Social Science. 636 (1): 150–163. doi:10.1177/0002716211398434. S2CID 145269097.
