= Quchan =

City in Razavi Khorasan province, Iran

Quchan Persian: قوچان
- City
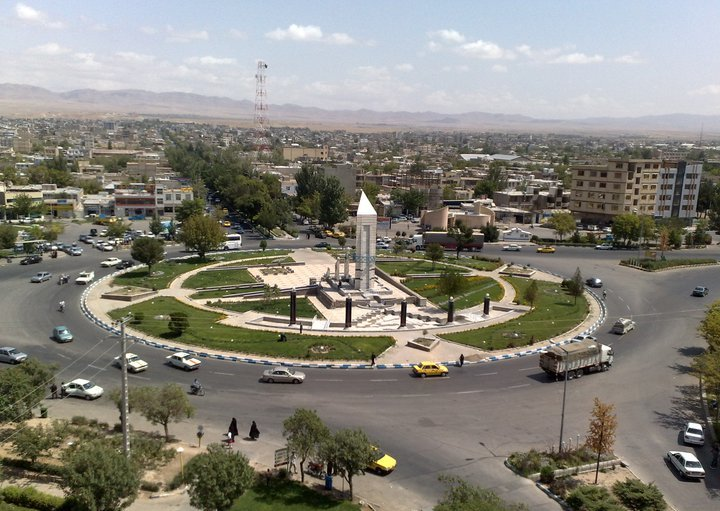
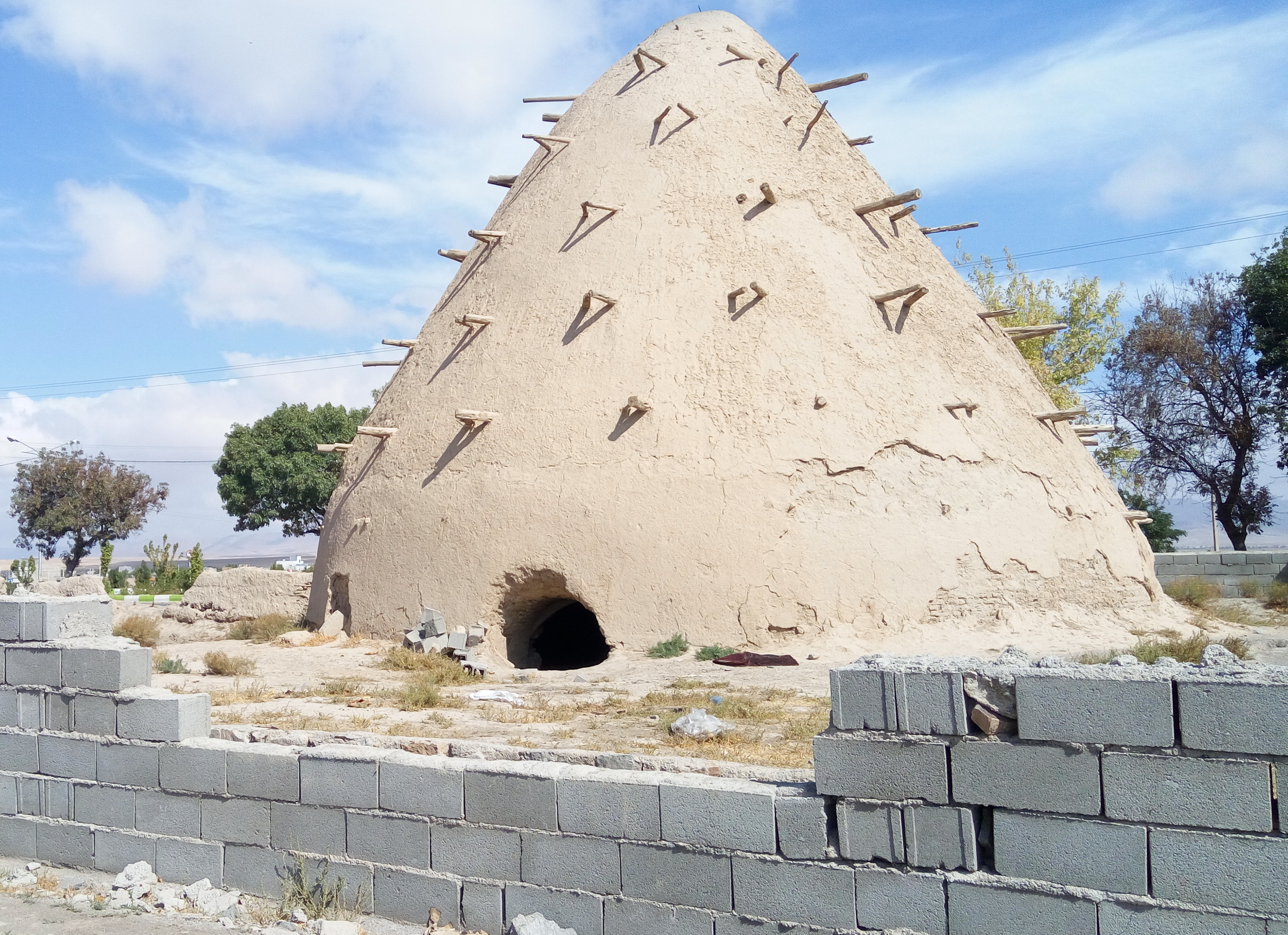
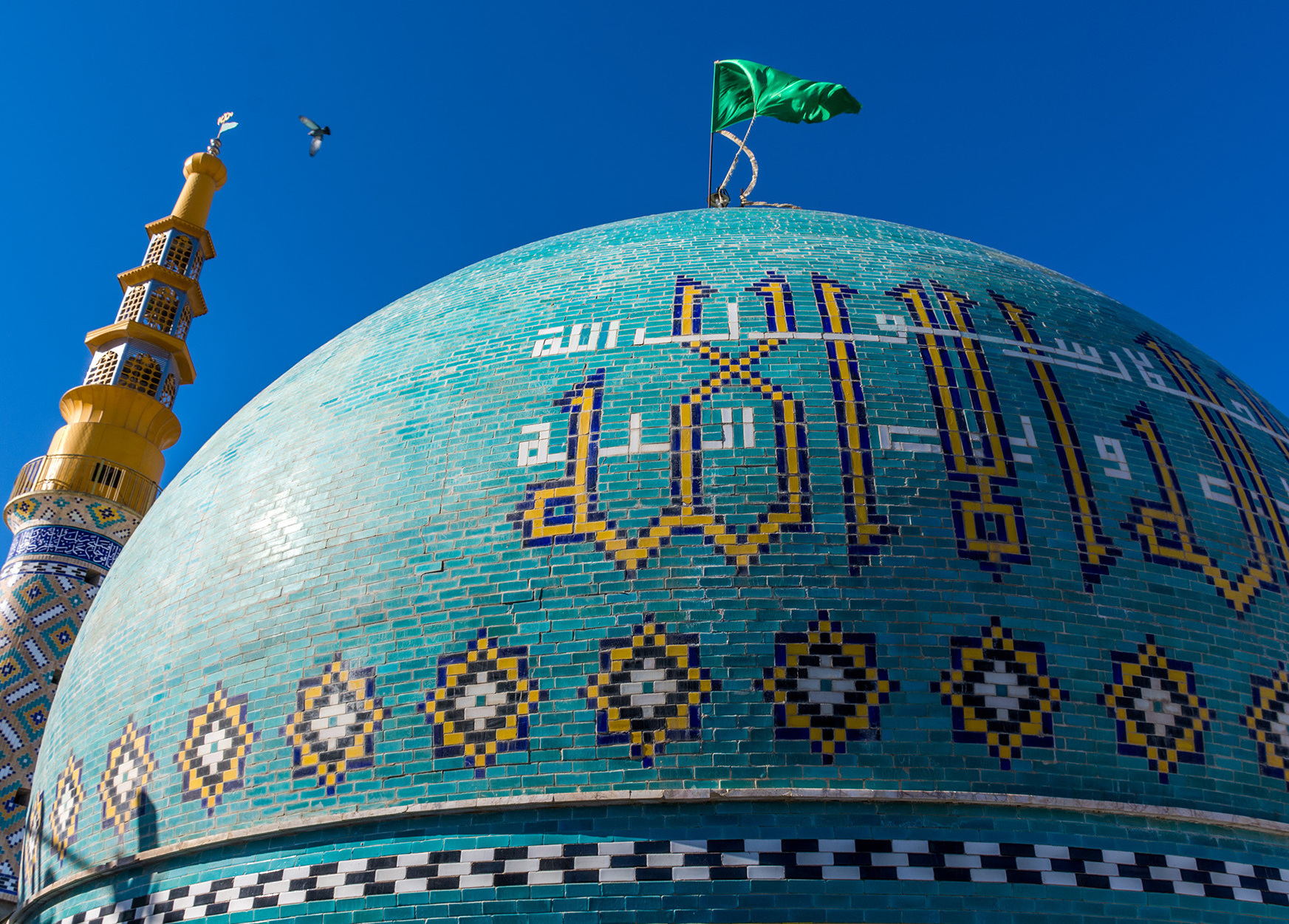
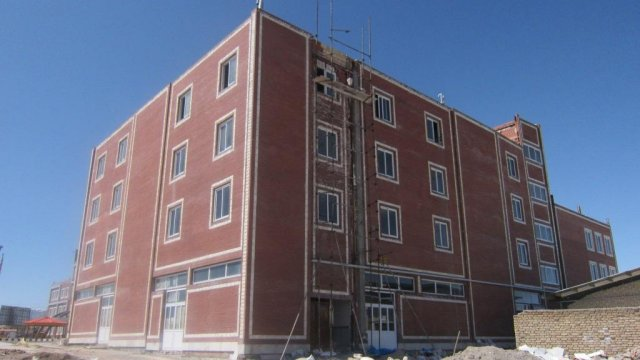
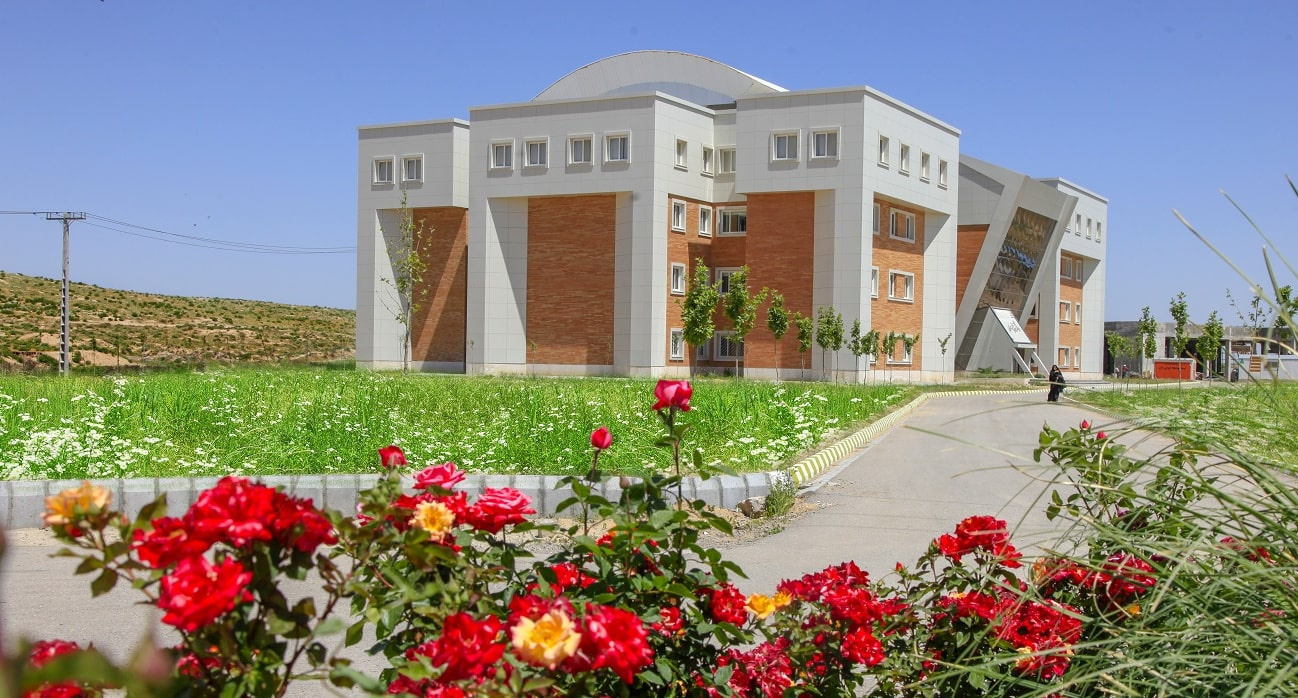
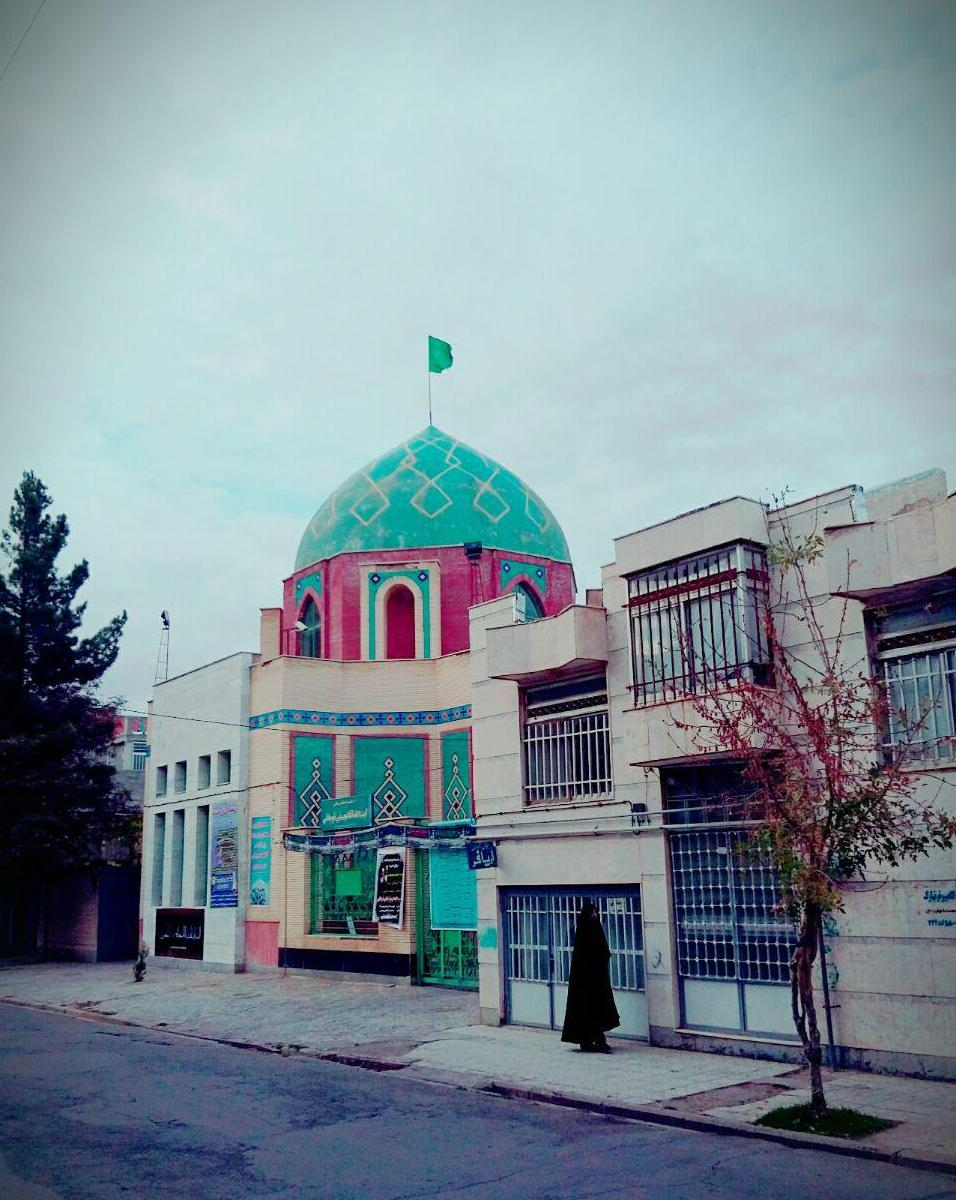

- Location within Iran
- Coordinates: 37°06′22″N 58°30′34″E
- Country: Iran
- Province: Razavi Khorasan
- County: Quchan
- District: Central

Population (2016)
  - Total: 101,604
- Time zone: UTC+3:30 (IRST)

Quchan (Persian: قوچان; pronounced [quˈtʃɑːn, ɢoˈtʃɒːn]) (Note: Also romanized as Quçan, Qučān, and Qūchān; also known as Gochan and Khabushan) is a city in the Central District of Quchan County, Razavi Khorasan province, Iran, serving as capital of both the county and the district. It is approximately 97 km south of the border city of Ashgabat, capital city of the neighboring country Turkmenistan.

The city of Quchan has been considered in the past due to its historical location, including having 140 historical monuments and having 32 monuments registered in the list of national monuments and 20 attractive tourist areas. Nader Shah was assassinated on 20 June 1747, at Quchan in Khorasan.

This city has trained famous scholars, mystics, thinkers, poets and heroes. Heroes such as Jafar Gholi Zangli and Noei khaboushani and Ahmad Vafadar who technically struck the heroes Abbas Zandi and Gholamreza Takhti and won the wrestling armband for three consecutive national championships.

== History ==
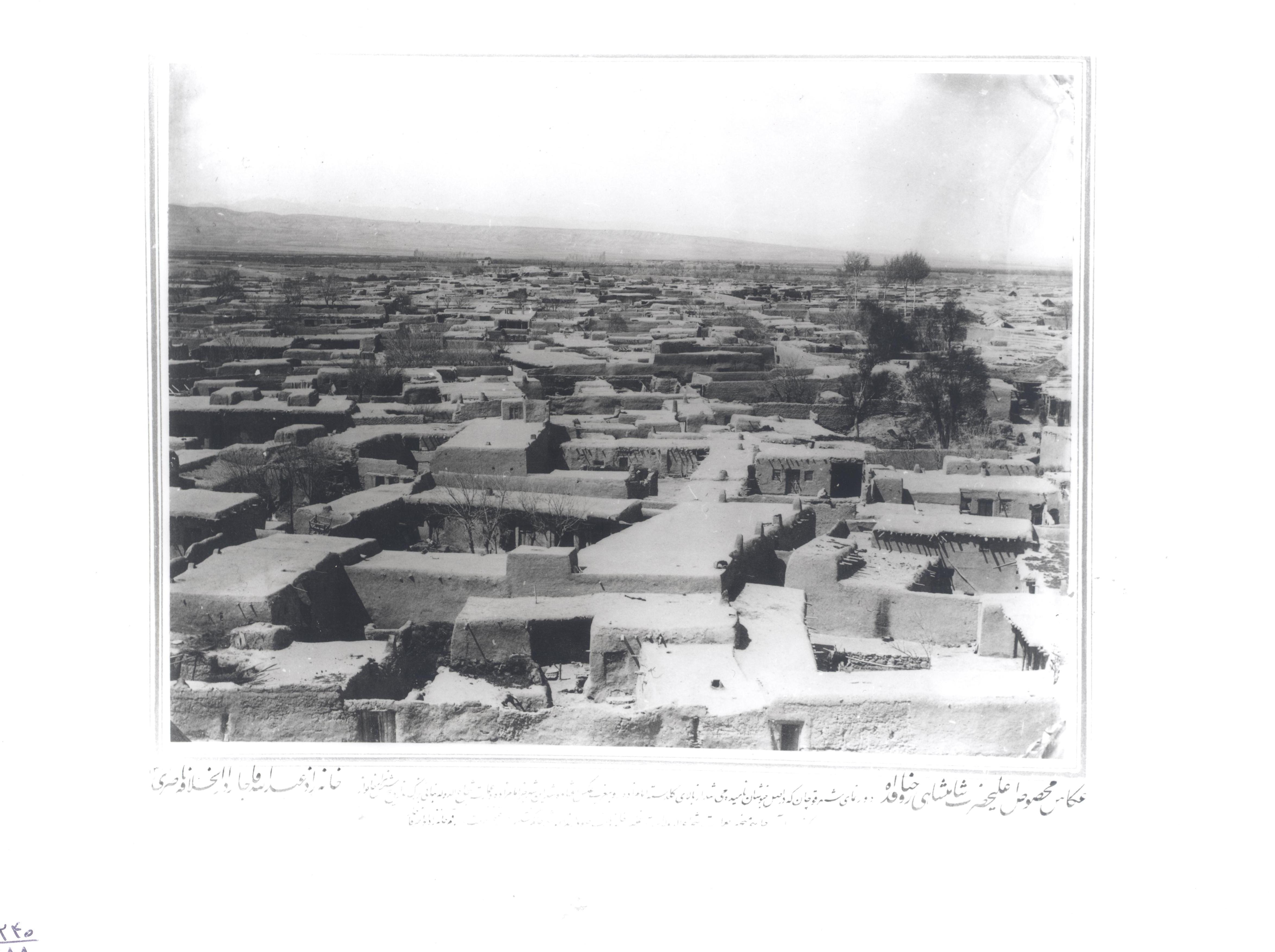
Quchan photographed by Abdollah Mirza Qajar, 1894

Quchan city is located in 10 km of old Quchan and its distance to Mashhad is about 130 km and to Bajgiran (Iran-Turkmenistan border) 84 km and to the center of Turkmenistan (Ashgabat) is 118 km and has two important parts. The central part and the part of the tax collectors.

It is stated in the historical writings: Asak was the name of a city from the village or mountain of Khorasan, where Parth is called, and its founder was Ashk Aol. The oldest capital of the Parthians was in a place called Astaka or Areska in the present-day Qochan region, after the names of Asak and Areska, Stu and Stua were named. The residence of the Ashkani family was in Asak, and this name came from there and was changed to Ashak, Arshak, Ashk, and Ashkanian. In his inscription, Darius the Great connects Part Roza with Zarnka and Herat, and Sargarti, which was located in the Lut desert, with Gorgan.

The length of this province from west to east is 480 km, and its width is 200 km, and the main area of Part has an area of 96,000 square kilometers. This area is surrounded by three mountain ranges. Daman Kouh or the Akrad Mountains, whose range extends to the Khorezm desert, "in fact, the northern mountain chain", another Aladagh and Miraby in the middle, called Jagtai Mountains or Jovin Mountains, continue in the south.

Ashk declared his kingdom for the first time in the city of Asak and near the current Quchan. Nilsson writes twice that Andragoras, who was ruling Parthia before Antiochus II, was killed in this raisin, and apparently Arsasis was crowned king in a city called Asak, which was located near Quchan in the Etrak valley. Ho Feman has speculated that the eternal fire of the city of Asak in the Astaoin state, in the presence of which Arshak, the founder of the Parthian dynasty, ascended to the royal throne is the same as the fire of Azerbarzin Mehr, because the place of this fire was near the city of Asak during the Sasanian era.

In the present Ostad (one of the districts of Qochan), which according to the narration of the local people, due to their handiwork and art by Khosrow Parviz, the name of Ostad was given to them, and Moghadisi in Hasan al-Taqasim also mentioned the mention of their handiwork. There is the name of Atashgah, which confirms the presence of many ashes, and a basic and comprehensive investigation should be done because it is possible that it is the same place as the famous Atashkada, which time has destroyed its traces.

Alferofen Gottschmid considers Astaune, which also includes the city of Quchan, as one of the eighteen satraps of the Ashkan period, and considers the current Khobushan as one of its cities. It was in this city that the Perti Arshak tribe was killed in 249 AD. M was elected king"

Since 1316, when the first law of national division was approved, Quchan was recognized as one of the seven provinces of Greater Khorasan along with the cities of Bojnourd, Birjand, Sabzevar, Gonabad, Mashhad and Torbat-e Heydarieh. Separated.

=== Ninth province ===
The ninth province was one of the 10 provinces of Iran, which was designated as the ninth province in January 1915, with the amendment of the law on the division of the country. This province included the cities of Quchan, Sabzevar, Gonabad, Bojnourd, Birjand, Torbat Heydariyeh and Mashhad (the capital of the province).

=== City expansion ===
In 1895, after the earthquake of the previous year, the current city was built 12 km from the old city with the help of Mohammad Nasser Khan Shoa al-Dowleh, the head of the Zafranlu tribe and Russian engineers. During the reign of Reza Shah, the silo building, the water source and the arch bridge (Atrak Bridge) were built by the Germans in Quchan.

== Demographics ==
=== Ethnicity ===
The majority of the people in Quchan are Khorasani Kurdish people of the Zafaranlu tribe, who once spoke Kurdish, now speak Khorasani Turkish.

=== Population ===
At the time of the 2006 National Census, the city's population was 96,953 in 25,066 households. The following census in 2011 counted 103,760 people in 29,438 households. The 2016 census measured the population of the city as 101,604 people in 30,099 households.

== Geography ==
=== Location ===
Quchan is in the northeast of Iran in Razavi Khorasan province at an elevation of 1,149 meters above sea level and north of the Shah Jahan Mountains. It is south of the border with Turkmenistan. Quchan is connected by road to Mashhad, 125 km southeast and Turkmenistan, 100 km north.

Quchan has suffered from many earthquakes, and the town was relocated about 10 km east of the original town in 1895 following its destruction in another earthquake.

=== Climate ===
Quchan has a cold semi-arid climate (BSk).

Climate data for Ghoochan (1991-2020, extremes 1984-2020)
Month	Jan	Feb	Mar	Apr	May	Jun	Jul	Aug	Sep	Oct	Nov	Dec	Year
Record high °C (°F)	21.6 (70.9)	25.9 (78.6)	31.4 (88.5)	31.9 (89.4)	36.6 (97.9)	39.0 (102.2)	41.4 (106.5)	38.8 (101.8)	38.0 (100.4)	34.2 (93.6)	27.5 (81.5)	25.2 (77.4)	41.4 (106.5)
Mean daily maximum °C (°F)	5.8 (42.4)	7.9 (46.2)	13.2 (55.8)	19.6 (67.3)	24.8 (76.6)	30.1 (86.2)	32.1 (89.8)	31.3 (88.3)	27.8 (82.0)	21.4 (70.5)	13.3 (55.9)	8.2 (46.8)	19.6 (67.3)
Daily mean °C (°F)	−0.6 (30.9)	1.3 (34.3)	6.2 (43.2)	11.9 (53.4)	16.9 (62.4)	21.8 (71.2)	24.1 (75.4)	22.6 (72.7)	18.6 (65.5)	12.5 (54.5)	6.0 (42.8)	1.5 (34.7)	11.9 (53.4)
Mean daily minimum °C (°F)	−5.6 (21.9)	−3.6 (25.5)	0.5 (32.9)	5.4 (41.7)	9.2 (48.6)	12.7 (54.9)	14.7 (58.5)	13.0 (55.4)	9.5 (49.1)	4.8 (40.6)	0.2 (32.4)	−3.5 (25.7)	4.8 (40.6)
Record low °C (°F)	−25.4 (−13.7)	−24.0 (−11.2)	−18.8 (−1.8)	−10.9 (12.4)	−1.2 (29.8)	3.4 (38.1)	7.3 (45.1)	3.2 (37.8)	−1.6 (29.1)	−7.4 (18.7)	−17.1 (1.2)	−24.8 (−12.6)	−25.4 (−13.7)
Average precipitation mm (inches)	32.7 (1.29)	43.6 (1.72)	61.0 (2.40)	53.4 (2.10)	40.8 (1.61)	11.2 (0.44)	3.4 (0.13)	2.1 (0.08)	4.0 (0.16)	14.0 (0.55)	31.3 (1.23)	26.8 (1.06)	324.3 (12.77)
Average precipitation days	10.9	11.2	12.7	11.6	9.5	3.7	2.4	1.3	1.9	4.0	6.8	8.6	84.6
Average snowy days	8.5	8.4	5.9	1.0	0.1	0	0	0	0	0.1	2.0	5.3	31.3
Average relative humidity (%)	74	73	69	63	57	43	37	36	41	52	66	74	57
Average dew point °C (°F)	−4.5 (23.9)	−2.9 (26.8)	0.6 (33.1)	4.6 (40.3)	7.5 (45.5)	7.6 (45.7)	7.8 (46.0)	5.7 (42.3)	4.9 (40.8)	2.0 (35.6)	−0.2 (31.6)	−2.6 (27.3)	2.5 (36.6)
Mean monthly sunshine hours	151	154	170	213	271	332	353	347	297	249	173	148	2,858
Source: IRIMO(extremes 1984-2010, precipitation days and snow days) NCEI

== Economy ==
Factories and industrial areas

There are two industrial towns in Quchan city, the first town is located on Farooj road and the second town is located on Quchan-Mashhad highway.

In order to access the markets of Central Asian countries bordering Turkmenistan and close to the capital, the creation of a special economic zone in Quchan over the past few years was considered by officials and elites of Quchan. In a part of the industrial town, number two has been presented to the parliament after passing its legal process and is about to be established.

== Education ==
- Quchan University of Technology
- Islamic Azad University — Quchan Branch

== Notable people ==
- Porya Yali (born 1999) - volleyball player for the Iranian national team and club Paykan Tehran.
- Nader Shah was assassinated on 20 June 1747, at Quchan in Khorasan.

== See also ==
- The Story of the Daughters of Quchan, a 1998 political history by Afsaneh Najmabadi.
