= Journal of Middle East Women's Studies =

- Discipline: Women's studies
- Language: English
- Edited by: Soha Bayoumi, Ellen McLarney, Sherine Hafez

Publication details
- History: 2005–present
- Publisher: Duke University Press (United States)
- Frequency: Triannual
- Impact factor: 0.219 (2015)

Standard abbreviations
- ISO 4: J. Middle East Women's Stud.

Indexing
- ISSN: 1552-5864 (print); 1558-9579 (web)
- LCCN: 2004214905
- JSTOR: 15525864
- OCLC no.: 61311734

Links
- Journal homepage; Online archive; Online archive (Project MUSE)

Journal of Middle East Women's Studies is a triannual peer-reviewed interdisciplinary journal which advances Middle East gender, sexuality, and women's studies. It is published by Duke University Press for the Association for Middle East Women's Studies.

The journal is co-edited by Soha Bayoumi (The Johns Hopkins University), Ellen McLarney (Duke University), and Sherine Hafez (UC Riverside).

Editors emeritae include Frances S. Hasso, (Duke University), Miriam Cooke, (Duke University) and Banu Gökarıksel, (University of North Carolina at Chapel Hill).

== Abstracting and indexing ==
- Feminist Periodicals
- Sociological Abstracts
- Index Islamicus
- Index to Jewish Periodicals
- Humanities Index
- Project MUSE
- Wilson Omnifile
- EBSCO Current Abstracts
- EBSCO Current Citations Express
- EBSCO Education Research Complete
- EBSCO Education Research Index
- ProQuest Research Library
- ProQuest Genderwatch

According to the Journal Citation Reports, the journal has a 2015 impact factor of 0.219, ranking it =35th out of 40 journals in the category "Women's Studies".

== See also ==
- List of women's studies journals
