= Encyclopaedia of the World of Islam =

Persian encyclopedia

- Front page of the twenty-fifth volume
- Language: Persian, English, Arabic
- Publisher: Encyclopaedia Islamica Foundation
- Publication date: From 1996
- Publication place: Iran

Encyclopaedia of the World of Islam (Persian: دانشنامة جهان اسلام) (Daaneshnaame-ye Jahaan-e Eslam) is a Persian encyclopedia that deals with Islam and the history, civilization, and culture of Muslims from the beginning of Islam until now. This encyclopedia was published by the Encyclopaedia Islamica Foundation that has published more than seventy-five books in Persian and English languages in addition to twenty-nine volumes of Encyclopaedia of the world of Islam and twelve volumes of its Arabic translation under the title of دائرة معارف العالم الإسلاميّ. These activities take place in the structure of a research institute with more than 120 faculty members and a research library.

Its articles, arranged alphabetically, cover a wide range of topics: technical terms of Quranic sciences, prophetic traditions, Islamic law (fiqh), theology, mysticism, philosophy, letters (adab), art. This encyclopedia also focuses on the biographies of the prophets, Muslim saints (awlia') and Imams, the lives, works and views of Quran commentators, traditionists, legists (foqaha'), Muslim theologians, philosophers, scientists, mystics, historians, poets, and artists of the Islamic world. The articles also address the political history of Islam, biographies of caliphs, sultans, viziers, and accounts of past ruling dynasties, as well as the geography of countries and cities of the Islamic world (past and present), archaeology of secular and religious monuments. Lastly, the encyclopedia documents religious festivities and special days, artefacts, clothes, food items, plants, medicine, among other items peculiar to Islamic lands.

When compared to the Encyclopedia of Islam, the encyclopedia of the World of Islam differs in terms of the diversity of sources, the volume of theological articles, and the emphasis placed on Shia intellectual and cultural heritage, specifically Imamiyya and Iranian elements. The number of theological articles in the Encyclopedia of Islam is restricted to 404, whereas there are 749 entries in the Encyclopedia of the World of Islam. Theological entries in the Encyclopedia of Islam do not reference Shia sources, while the Encyclopedia of the World of Islam benefits from both Shia and Sunni sources.
