= Encyclopaedia Islamica Foundation =

Iranian research institute

- Abbreviation: BDE
- Formation: 1984; 42 years ago
- Founder: Ali Khamenei
- Type: Non-profit research organization
- Official language: Persian, Arabic, English, Urdu
- Main organ: High Counsil
- Website: https://rch.ac.ir/about

The Encyclopaedia Islamica Foundation (بنیاد دائره المعارف اسلامی)(Bonyād-e Dāyerat-al-ma̒āref-e eslāmi ) is a public and non-governmental institution that was established in Tehran in 1983-1984 to undertake preparing and publishing Encyclopaedia of the world of Islam to deal issues related to Islam and the history, civilization and culture of Muslim countries, especially Iran, and in this way to consolidate and expand the ties and cultural relations of the Muslim people. It was established by the decision of Ali Khamenei during his presidency. The EncyclopaediaIslamica Foundation has published more than 75 books in Persian and English languages in addition to publishing 29 volumes of Encyclopaedia of the world of Islam and 12 volumes of its translation into Arabic under the title of دائرة معارف العالم الإسلاميّ. These activities take place in the structure of a research institute with more than 120 faculty members and a research library.
