= Bernard Lewis bibliography =

Bernard Lewis (31 May 1916 – 19 May 2018) was a British-American historian, public intellectual, and political commentator. Lewis' expertise was in the history of Islam and the interaction between Islam and the West.

His advice was frequently sought by policymakers, including the Bush administration. Lewis wrote dozens of books, lectures, and essays.

== Books by Lewis ==
Publications by Bernard Lewis
Year	Book	Notes	Publisher
1940	Origins of Isma'ilism: A Study of the Historical Background of the Fatimid Caliphate		AMS Press
1940	Turkey To-day		Hutchinson & Co. (London)
1941	British Contributions to Arabic Studies		British Council
1947	A Handbook of Diplomatic and Political Arabic		Luzac and Co.
1948	Land of Enchanters: Egyptian Short Stories from the Earliest Times to the Present Day		Harvill Press
1950	The Arabs in History		Hutchinson's University Library
1952	Notes and Documents from the Turkish Archives: A Contribution to the History of the Jews in the Ottoman Empire		Israel Oriental Society
1961	The Emergence of Modern Turkey		Oxford University Press
1963	Istanbul and the Civilization of the Ottoman Empire		University of Oklahoma Press
1964	The Middle East and the West		Indiana University Press
1967	The Assassins: A Radical Sect in Islam		Weidenfeld & Nicolson
1971	The Cambridge History of Islam	Edited by Lewis, Peter M. Holt, and Ann K.S. Lambton	Cambridge University Press
1972	Race and Color in Islam		Joanna Cotler Books, ISBN 0-061-31590-7
1974	Islam: From the Prophet Muhammad to the Capture of Constantinople. Volume 1: Politics and War	Translated and edited by Lewis	Harper & Row
1974	Islam: From the Prophet Muhammad to the Capture of Constantinople. Volume 2: Religion and Society	Translated and edited by Lewis	Harper & Row
1975	History: Remembered, Recovered, Invented		Princeton University Press, ISBN 0-691-03547-4
1982	Christians and Jews in the Ottoman Empire: The Functioning of a Plural Society	Edited by Lewis and Benjamín Braude	Holmes & Meier Publishers, ISBN 0-841-90520-7
1982	The Muslim Discovery of Europe		W. W. Norton & Company, ISBN 0-393-01529-7
1984	The Jews of Islam		Princeton University Press, ISBN 0-691-05419-3
1987	Semites and Anti-Semites: An Inquiry Into Conflict and Prejudice		W. W. Norton & Company, ISBN 0-393-30420-5
1988	The Political Language of Islam		University of Chicago Press, ISBN 0-226-47692-8
1990	Race and Slavery in the Middle East: an Historical Enquiry		Oxford University Press, ISBN 0-195-06283-3
1993	Islam and the West		Oxford University Press, ISBN 0-195-06283-3
1993	Islam in History: Ideas, People, and Events in the Middle East		Open Court Publishing Company, ISBN 0-812-69217-9
1994	The Shaping of the Modern Middle East		Oxford University Press, ISBN 0-195-07282-0
1995	Cultures in Conflict: Christians, Muslims, and Jews in the Age of Discovery		Oxford University Press, ISBN 0-195-09026-8
1995	The Middle East: A Brief History of the Last 2,000 Years		Scribner, ISBN 0-684-80712-2
1999	The Future of the Middle East: Predictions		Orion Publishing Group, ISBN 0-297-81980-1
1999	The Multiple Identities of the Middle East		Schocken Books, ISBN 0-805-24172-8
2000	A Middle East Mosaic: Fragments of Life, Letters and History	Selected and edited by Lewis	Modern Library, ISBN 0-375-75837-2
2001	Music of a Distant Drum: Classical Arabic, Persian, Turkish, and Hebrew Poems	Translated by Lewis	Princeton University Press, ISBN 0-691-08928-0
2002	What Went Wrong?: The Clash Between Islam and Modernity in the Middle East		Weidenfeld & Nicolson, ISBN 0-297-82929-7
2003	The Crisis of Islam: Holy War and Unholy Terror		Weidenfeld & Nicolson, ISBN 0-297-64548-X
2004	From Babel to Dragomans: Interpreting the Middle East		Weidenfeld & Nicolson, ISBN 0-297-84884-4
2008	Islam: The Religion and the People	Coauthored by Buntzie Ellis Churchill	FT Press, ISBN 0-132-23085-2
2010	Faith and Power: Religion and Politics in the Middle East		Oxford University Press, ISBN 0-195-14421-X
2011	The End of Modern History in the Middle East		Hoover Institution Press, ISBN 0-817-91294-0
2012	Notes on a Century: Reflections of a Middle East Historian		Viking Adult, ISBN 0-670-02353-1

== Films ==
Film and television appearances
Year	Title	Role
2000	Charlie Rose (episode dated 5 June 2000)	Himself
2001	Charlie Rose (episode dated 18 October 2001)	Himself
2008	The Third Jihad: Radical Islam's Vision For America	Himself
2010	America at Risk	Himself
