= The Muslim Discovery of Europe =

1982 book by Bernard Lewis

- 1983 edition cover
- Author: Bernard Lewis
- Language: English
- Genre: Non-fiction
- Publisher: W.W. Norton & Co.
- Publication date: 1982
- ISBN: 978-0-297-78140-0

The Muslim Discovery of Europe is a non-fiction book by Bernard Lewis, published by W.W. Norton & Co. in 1982.

The scope of the work goes from Early Muslim conquests in the continent up to the latter part of the 1700s.

Reviewer Muhammad Al-Faruque wrote that how the "Muslim world remained curiously uninterested in their European neighbours" was among the "main themes" of the work.

== Background ==
In the 1950s Lewis first published an article with the title "The Muslim Discovery of Europe", which was presented at the 1955 International Congress of Historical Sciences. He gave speeches and wrote articles about this topic.

Thomas D. Goodrich of Indiana University of Pennsylvania wrote that Ottoman material provided "well over" 50% of the sourcing of the content.

== Contents ==
Part one describes the Western world-Islam interactions throughout history, and how they were viewed by Muslims. Part two describes how the groups communicated and entities that were go-betweens. Several specialties of this theme are described in the third part. The book does not use chronological order.

The book includes content that was originally in Arabic, Ottoman Turkish, and Persian. Muhammad Al-Faruque described portions of this content as "little known and not very accessible".

The book does not describe interactions between the West and Islam in South Asia and Southeast Asia, and it does not have translations of content from other languages.

Some of the material was previously published as chapters of other publications.

== Reception ==
Al-Faruque stated that the work is "informative, lucid and demonstrates the breadth of [the author's] knowledge" According to Al-Faruque, there were some "editorial problems", citing what he stated was lack of integration of some previously standalone content.

Charles Fraser Beckingham wrote that the work is "lucid, eminently readable, elegantly, at times wittily, written, well-informed, and cautious in judgment."

T. B. Irving criticized the book for, in his words, "insulting and irritating language".

Richard W. Bulliet stated that the work should be studied together with Islam and the West and that it is "impressive and useful as a contribution to knowledge in a hitherto little explored area." However, Bulliet also argued that the "tenor" is "derisive and condescending towards Muslims to such an extent that the book's analytical value is seriously undermined".

Kirkus Reviews stated that the work is "vulnerable" to the same critiques regarding "assumptions about the inferiority of Islam" as are Lewis' previous works. The Kirkus review stated that the main idea does not address why different groups of people in the Islamic world reacted differently to Western cultural influences.
