= Charles Krauthammer =

American psychiatrist and journalist (1950–2018)

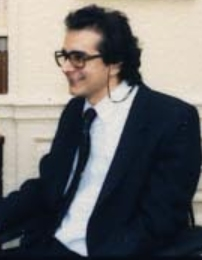
- Krauthammer in 1986
- Born: Irving Charles Krauthammer; March 13, 1950; New York City, U.S.
- Died: June 21, 2018 (aged 68); Atlanta, Georgia, U.S.
- Education: McGill University (BA); Balliol College, Oxford; Harvard University (MD)
- Occupations: Political columnist; author; speechwriter; psychiatrist
- Years active: 1978–2018
- Employers: The New Republic (1979–2003); The Washington Post (1985–2018); The Weekly Standard; Time (1983–2018); Inside Washington (1990–2013); Fox News Channel (2005–2017)
- Spouse: Robyn Trethewey (m. 1974)
- Children: 1
- Website: charleskrauthammer.com

Charles Krauthammer (/ˈkraʊthæmər/; March 13, 1950 – June 21, 2018) was an American political columnist and psychiatrist. A conservative pundit, Krauthammer won the Pulitzer Prize for his columns in The Washington Post in 1987. His weekly column was syndicated to more than 400 publications worldwide.

While in his first year studying medicine at Harvard Medical School, Krauthammer became permanently paralyzed from the waist down after a diving board accident that severed his spinal cord at cervical spinal nerve 5. After spending 14 months recovering in a hospital, he returned to medical school, graduating to become a psychiatrist involved in the creation of the Diagnostic and Statistical Manual of Mental Disorders III in 1980. He joined the Carter administration in 1978 as a director of psychiatric research, eventually becoming the speechwriter to Vice President Walter Mondale in 1980.

In the late 1970s and early 1980s, Krauthammer embarked on a career as a columnist and political commentator. In 1985, he began writing a weekly column for The Washington Post, which earned him the 1987 Pulitzer Prize for Commentary for his "witty and insightful columns on national issues". He was a weekly panelist on the PBS news program Inside Washington from 1990 until it ceased production in December 2013. Krauthammer had been a contributing editor to The Weekly Standard, a Fox News contributor, and a nightly panelist on Special Report with Bret Baier on Fox News.

Krauthammer received acclaim for his writing on foreign policy, among other matters. He was a leading conservative voice and proponent of United States military and political engagement on the global stage, coining the term Reagan Doctrine and advocating both the Gulf War and the Iraq War. In August 2017, due to his battle with cancer, Krauthammer stopped writing his column and serving as a Fox News contributor. He died on June 21, 2018.

== Early life and career ==
Krauthammer was born on March 13, 1950, in the New York City borough of Manhattan. His father, Shulim Krauthammer (November 23, 1904 – June 1987), was from Bolekhiv, Ukraine (then the Austro-Hungarian Empire), and later became a naturalized citizen of France. His mother, Thea (née Horowitz; July 28, 1921 – February 14, 2019), was from Antwerp, Belgium. The Krauthammer family spoke French in the household. When he was five, the family moved to Montreal. Through the school year they resided in Montreal, and spent the summers in Long Beach, New York. Both of his parents were Orthodox Jews, and he graduated from Herzliah High School.

Krauthammer attended McGill University in Montreal, graduating in 1970 with first-class honours in economics and political science. At that time, McGill was a hotbed of radical sentiment, something that Krauthammer said influenced his dislike of political extremism. "I became very acutely aware of the dangers, the hypocrisies, and sort of the extremism of the political extremes. And it cleansed me very early in my political evolution of any romanticism." He later said: "I detested the extreme Left and extreme Right, and found myself somewhere in the middle." The following year, after graduating from McGill, he studied as a Commonwealth Scholar in politics at Balliol College, Oxford, before returning to the United States to attend medical school at Harvard.

A diving accident during his first year of medical school left Krauthammer paralyzed from the waist down. He remained with his Harvard Medical School class during his hospitalization, graduating in 1975. He credited Hermann Lisco, associate dean of students, for making it happen. From 1975 through 1978, Krauthammer was a resident in psychiatry at Massachusetts General Hospital, serving as chief resident his final year. During his time as chief resident, he identified a variant of manic depression (bipolar disorder) that he named secondary mania. He published his findings in the Archives of General Psychiatry. He also co-authored a path-finding study on the epidemiology of mania.

In 1978, Krauthammer relocated to Washington, D.C., to direct planning in psychiatric research under the Carter administration. He began contributing articles about politics to The New Republic and, in 1980, served as a speechwriter to Vice President Walter Mondale. He contributed to the third edition of the Diagnostic and Statistical Manual of Mental Disorders. In 1984, he was board certified in psychiatry by the American Board of Psychiatry and Neurology.

== Career as columnist and political commentator ==
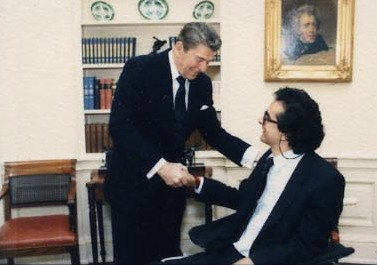
Krauthammer greeting President Ronald Reagan in 1986

In 1979, Krauthammer joined The New Republic as both a writer and editor. In 1983, he began writing essays for Time magazine, including one on the Reagan Doctrine, which first brought him national acclaim as a writer. Krauthammer began writing regular editorials for The Washington Post in 1985 and became a nationally syndicated columnist. Krauthammer coined and developed the term Reagan Doctrine in 1985, and he defined the U.S. role as sole superpower in his essay "The Unipolar Moment", published shortly after the fall of the Berlin Wall in 1989.

In 1990, Krauthammer became a panelist for the weekly PBS political roundtable Inside Washington, remaining with the show until it ceased production in December 2013. Krauthammer also appeared on Fox News Channel as a contributor for many years. Krauthammer's 2004 speech "Democratic Realism", which was delivered to the American Enterprise Institute when Krauthammer won the Irving Kristol Award, set out a framework for tackling the post-9/11 world, focusing on the promotion of democracy in the Middle East.

In 2013, Krauthammer published Things That Matter: Three Decades of Passions, Pastimes and Politics. An immediate bestseller, the book remained on The New York Times bestseller list for 38 weeks and spent 10 weeks in a row at number one. His son Daniel is responsible for the final edits on a book that was posthumously released, The Point of It All: A Lifetime of Great Loves and Endeavors, that was published in December 2018.

== Personal life ==
In 1974, Krauthammer married his wife, Robyn, a lawyer who stopped practicing law in order to focus on her work as an artist. They had one child, Daniel Krauthammer. Charles Krauthammer's brother, Marcel, died in 2006.

Krauthammer was Jewish, raised largely in the Orthodox tradition, but in his adult life he variously described himself as "not religious" and "a Jewish Shinto" who engaged in "ancestor worship". At the same time, while he considered himself a skeptic regarding religious fanaticism and those claiming to hold certainty of any particular theological dogma, he was also quite scornful of atheism, once being quoted as saying that of all the belief systems he was aware of, "the only one I know is NOT true is atheism." His beliefs were sometimes described as a version of the "ceremonial Deism" exhibited by some of the U.S. Founding Fathers, particularly Thomas Jefferson. He was also influenced by his study of Maimonides at McGill University with Rabbi David Hartman, the head of Jerusalem's Shalom Hartman Institute and professor of philosophy at McGill during Krauthammer's student days.

Krauthammer was a member of both the Chess Journalists of America and the Council on Foreign Relations. He was co-founder of Pro Musica Hebraica, a not-for-profit organization devoted to presenting Jewish classical music, much of it lost or forgotten, in a concert hall setting. Krauthammer was a big baseball fan. He enjoyed chess to a point that he gave it up later in life, fearing he was addicted. In the final presidential election of his life, that of 2016, he refused to support either candidate and declared his intention to cast a write-in vote after giving extensive explanations for why he could support neither Hillary Clinton nor Donald Trump.

== Death ==
In August 2017, Krauthammer had a cancerous tumor removed from his abdomen. The surgery was thought to have been successful; however, on June 8, 2018, Krauthammer announced that his cancer had returned and that doctors had given him only weeks to live. On June 21, he died of small intestine cancer at Emory University Hospital in Atlanta, Georgia. He was 68. Krauthammer was survived by his wife and son. Mitch McConnell, Chris Wallace, David Nakamura, Megyn Kelly, John Roberts, Bret Baier, Mike Pence, and others paid tribute to him.

== Views and perspectives ==
=== Bioethics and medicine ===
Krauthammer was a supporter of abortion legalization (although he believed Roe v. Wade was wrongly decided) and opposed to euthanasia. Krauthammer was appointed to President George W. Bush's Council on Bioethics in 2002. He supported relaxing the Bush administration's limits on federal funding of discarded human embryonic stem cell research. Krauthammer supported embryonic stem cell research using embryos discarded by fertility clinics with restrictions in its applications. However, he opposed human cloning. He warned that scientists were beginning to develop the power of "creating a class of superhumans". A fellow member of the council, Janet D. Rowley, insists that Krauthammer's vision was still an issue far in the future and not a topic to be discussed at the present time.

In March 2009, Krauthammer was invited to the signing of an executive order by President Barack Obama at the White House but declined to attend because of his fears about the cloning of human embryos and the creation of normal human embryos solely for purposes of research. He also contrasted the "moral seriousness" of Bush's stem cell address of August 9, 2001, with that of Obama's address on stem cells. Krauthammer was critical of the idea of living wills and the current state of end-of-life counseling and feared that Obamacare would just worsen the situation:

When my father was dying, my mother and brother and I had to decide how much treatment to pursue. What was a better way to ascertain my father's wishes: What he checked off on a form one fine summer's day years before being stricken; or what we, who had known him intimately for decades, thought he would want? The answer is obvious.

=== Energy and global warming ===
Krauthammer was a longtime advocate of radically higher energy taxes to induce conservation. Krauthammer wrote in The Washington Post on February 20, 2014, "I'm not a global warming believer. I'm not a global warming denier." Objecting to declaring global warming settled science, he contended that much that is believed to be settled turns out not to be so.

=== Foreign policy ===
Krauthammer first gained attention in 1985 when he first used the phrase "Reagan Doctrine" in his Time magazine column. The phrase was a reference to the American foreign policy of supporting anti-communist insurgencies around the globe (most notably Nicaragua, Angola, and Afghanistan) as a response to the Brezhnev Doctrine and reflected a U.S. foreign policy that went beyond containment of the Soviet Union to rollback of recent Soviet influence in the Third World. The policy, which was strongly supported by Heritage Foundation foreign policy analysts and other conservatives, was ultimately embraced by Reagan's senior national security and foreign policy officials. Krauthammer's description of it as the "Reagan Doctrine" has since endured. In "The Poverty of Realism" (New Republic, February 17, 1986), he asserted:

that the end of American foreign policy is not just the security of the United States, but what John F. Kennedy called "the success of liberty." That means, first, defending the community of democratic nations (the repository of the liberal idea) and second, encouraging the establishment of new liberal policies at the frontier, most especially in the Third World.

Krauthammer argued the foreign policy should be both "universal in aspiration" and "prudent in application", thus combining American idealism and realism. Over the next 20 years these ideas developed into what is now called "democratic realism". In 1990, at the end the Cold War, Krauthammer wrote several articles entitled "The Unipolar Moment". Krauthammer used the term "unipolarity" to describe the world structure that was emerging with the fall of the Soviet Union, with world power residing in the "serenely dominant" Western alliance led by the United States. Krauthammer predicted that the bipolar world of the Cold War would give way not to a multipolar world in which the U.S. was one of many centers of power, but a unipolar world dominated by the United States with a power gap between the most powerful state and the second most powerful state that would exceed any other in history. He also suggested that American hegemony would inevitably exist for only a historical "moment" lasting at most three or four decades.

Hegemony gave the United States the capacity and responsibility to act unilaterally if necessary, Krauthammer argued. Throughout the 1990s, however, he was circumspect about how that power ought to be used. He split from his neoconservative colleagues who were arguing for an interventionist policy of "American greatness". Krauthammer wrote that in the absence of a global existential threat, the United States should stay out of "teacup wars" in failed states, and instead adopt a "dry powder" foreign policy of nonintervention and readiness. Krauthammer opposed purely "humanitarian intervention" (with the exception of overt genocide). While he supported the 1991 Gulf War on the grounds of both humanitarianism and strategic necessity (preventing Saddam Hussein from gaining control of the Persian Gulf and its resources), he opposed American intervention in the Yugoslav Wars on the grounds that America should not be committing the lives of its soldiers to purely humanitarian missions in which there is no American national interest at stake.

Krauthammer's major 2004 monograph on foreign policy, "Democratic Realism: An American Foreign Policy for a Unipolar World", was critical both of the neoconservative Bush doctrine for being too expansive and utopian, and of foreign policy "realism" for being too narrow and immoral; instead, he proposed an alternative he called "Democratic Realism".

In a 2005 speech later published in Commentary magazine, Krauthammer called neoconservatism "a governing ideology whose time has come." He noted that the original "fathers of neoconservatism" were "former liberals or leftists". More recently, they have been joined by "realists, newly mugged by reality" such as Condoleezza Rice, Richard Cheney, and George W. Bush, who "have given weight to neoconservatism, making it more diverse and, given the newcomers' past experience, more mature".

In a 2008 column entitled "Charlie Gibson's Gaffe", Krauthammer elaborated on the changing meanings of the Bush Doctrine in light of Gibson's questioning of Republican vice-presidential candidate Sarah Palin regarding what exactly the Bush Doctrine was, which resulted in criticism of Palin's response. Krauthammer states that the phrase originally referred to "the unilateralism that characterized the pre-9/11 first year of the Bush administration," but elaborates, "There is no single meaning of the Bush doctrine. In fact, there have been four distinct meanings, each one succeeding another over the eight years of this administration."

==== Israel ====
Krauthammer has been described as "predictably tak[ing] Israel's side and devot[ing] a significant amount of his... writing to defending steadfast U.S. support for Israel". Israeli Prime Minister Benjamin Netanyahu described his relationship with Krauthammer as "like brothers". Krauthammer strongly opposed the Oslo accords and said that Palestine Liberation Organization leader Yasir Arafat would use the foothold it gave him in the West Bank and the Gaza Strip to continue the war against Israel that he had ostensibly renounced in the Israel–Palestine Liberation Organization letters of recognition. In a July 2006 essay in Time, Krauthammer wrote that the Israeli–Palestinian conflict was fundamentally defined by the Palestinians' unwillingness to accept compromise.

During the 2006 Lebanon War, Krauthammer wrote a column, "Let Israel Win the War": "What other country, when attacked in an unprovoked aggression across a recognized international frontier, is then put on a countdown clock by the world, given a limited time window in which to fight back, regardless of whether it has restored its own security?" He later criticized Israeli prime minister Ehud Olmert's conduct, arguing that Olmert "has provided unsteady and uncertain leadership. Foolishly relying on air power alone, he denied his generals the ground offensive they wanted, only to reverse himself later."

Krauthammer supported a two-state solution to the conflict. Unlike many conservatives, he supported Israel's Gaza withdrawal as a step toward rationalizing the frontiers between Israel and a future Palestinian state. He believed a security barrier between the two states' final borders will be an important element of any lasting peace.

When Richard Goldstone retracted the claim 1 1/2 years after the issuance of the UN report on the 2008 Gaza war that Israel intentionally killed Palestinian civilians, including children, Krauthammer strongly criticized Goldstone, saying that "this weasel-y excuse-laden retraction is too little and too late" and called "the original report a blood libel ranking with the libels of the 19th century in which Jews were accused of ritually slaughtering children in order to use the blood in rituals". Krauthammer thought that Goldstone "should spend the rest of his life undoing the damage and changing and retracting that report".

==== 9/11, Iraq, and the War on Terror ====
Krauthammer laid out the underlying principle of strategic necessity restraining democratic idealism in his controversial 2004 Kristol Award Lecture: "We will support democracy everywhere, but we will commit blood and treasure only in places where there is a strategic necessity—meaning, places central to the larger war against the existential enemy, the enemy that poses a global mortal threat to freedom."

The 9/11 attacks, Krauthammer wrote, made clear the new existential threat and the necessity for a new interventionism. On September 12, 2001, he wrote that, if the suspicion that bin Laden was behind the attack proved correct, the United States had no choice but to go to war in Afghanistan. He supported the Second Iraq War on the "realist" grounds of the strategic threat the Saddam regime posed to the region as UN sanctions were eroding and of his alleged weapons of mass destruction and on the "idealist" grounds that a self-sustaining democracy in Iraq would be a first step toward changing the poisonous political culture of tyranny, intolerance, and religious fanaticism in the Arab world that had incubated the anti-American extremism from which 9/11 emerged.

In October 2002, he presented what he believed were the primary arguments for and against the war, writing, "Hawks favor war on the grounds that Saddam Hussein is reckless, tyrannical, and instinctively aggressive, and that if he comes into possession of nuclear weapons in addition to the weapons of mass destruction he already has, he is likely to use them or share them with terrorists. The threat of mass death on a scale never before seen residing in the hands of an unstable madman is intolerable—and must be preempted. Doves oppose war on the grounds that the risks exceed the gains. War with Iraq could be very costly, possibly degenerating into urban warfare."

He continued: "I happen to believe that the preemption school is correct, that the risks of allowing Saddam Hussein to acquire his weapons will only grow with time. Nonetheless, I can both understand and respect those few Democrats who make the principled argument against war with Iraq on the grounds of deterrence, believing that safety lies in reliance on a proven (if perilous) balance of terror rather than the risky innovation of forcible disarmament by preemption."

On the eve of the invasion, Krauthammer wrote, "Reformation and reconstruction of an alien culture are a daunting task. Risky and, yes, arrogant." In February 2003, Krauthammer cautioned that "it may yet fail. But we cannot afford not to try. There is not a single, remotely plausible, alternative strategy for attacking the monster behind 9/11. It's not Osama bin Laden; it is the cauldron of political oppression, religious intolerance, and social ruin in the Arab-Islamic world—oppression transmuted and deflected by regimes with no legitimacy into virulent, murderous anti-Americanism." Krauthammer in 2003 wrote that the reconstruction of Iraq would provide many benefits for the Iraqi people, once the political and economic infrastructure destroyed by Saddam was restored: "With its oil, its urbanized middle class, its educated population, its essential modernity, Iraq has a future. In two decades Saddam Hussein reduced its GDP by 75 percent. Once its political and industrial infrastructures are reestablished, Iraq's potential for rebound, indeed for explosive growth, is unlimited."

On April 22, 2003, Krauthammer predicted that he would have a "credibility problem" if weapons of mass destruction were not found in Iraq within the next five months. In a speech to the Foreign Policy Association in Philadelphia, he argued that the beginnings of democratization in the Arab world had been met in 2006 with a "fierce counterattack" by radical Islamist forces in Lebanon, Palestine, and especially Iraq, which witnessed a major intensification in sectarian warfare. In late 2006 and 2007, he was one of the few commentators to support the troop surge in Iraq.

In 2009, Krauthammer argued that the use of torture against enemy combatants was impermissible except in two contexts: (a) when "[an] innocent's life is at stake," "[the] bad guy you have captured possesses information that could save this life, [and he] refuses to divulge"; and (b) when torture may lead to "the extraction of information from a high-value enemy in possession of high-value information likely to save lives".

=== Ideology ===
Meg Greenfield, editorial page editor for The Washington Post who edited Krauthammer's columns for 15 years, called his weekly column "independent and hard to peg politically. It's a very tough column. There's no 'trendy' in it. You never know what is going to happen next." Hendrik Hertzberg, also a former colleague of Krauthammer while they worked at The New Republic in the 1980s, said that when the two first met in 1978, Krauthammer was "70 percent Mondale liberal, 30 percent 'Scoop Jackson Democrat', that is, hard-line on Israel and relations with the Soviet Union"; in the mid-1980s, he was still "50–50: fairly liberal on economic and social questions but a full-bore foreign-policy neoconservative". Hertzberg in 2009 called Krauthammer a "pretty solid 90–10 Republican". Krauthammer was described by some as having been a conservative.

=== Presidential elections ===
A few days before the 2012 United States presidential election, Krauthammer predicted it would be "very close" with Republican candidate Mitt Romney winning the "popular [vote] by, I think, about half a point, Electoral College probably a very narrow margin". After admitting his incorrect prediction, Krauthammer maintained, "Obama won but had no mandate. He won by going very small, very negative."

Before the 2016 United States presidential election, Krauthammer stated that "I will not vote for Hillary Clinton, but, as I've explained in my columns, I could never vote for Donald Trump." In July 2017 following the release by Donald Trump Jr. of the email chain about the Trump Tower meeting on June 9, 2016, Krauthammer opined that even bungled collusion is still collusion.

=== Religion ===
Krauthammer received a rigorous Jewish education. He attended a school where half the day was devoted to secular studies and half the day was devoted to religious education conducted in Hebrew. By the time he graduated from high school at the age of 16, Krauthammer was able to write philosophical essays in Hebrew. His father demanded that he learn Talmud; in addition to his school's required Talmud studies, Krauthammer took extra Talmud classes three days a week. This was not enough for his father who hired a rabbi to provide private instruction on the Talmud three nights a week.

Krauthammer's attachment to Judaism was strengthened through his study of Maimonides at McGill University under Rabbi David Hartman. Krauthammer said, "I had discovered the world, and was going to leave all of this [Judaism] behind, because I was too sophisticated for it. And then in my third year I took Hartman's course in Maimonides, and I'm thinking this is pretty serious stuff. It stands up to the Greeks, stands up to the philosophers of the age, and it gave me sort of a renewed commitment to and respect for my own tradition, which I already knew, but was ready to throw away. And I didn't throw it away as a result of that encounter."

Krauthammer stated that "atheism is the least plausible of all theologies. I mean, there are a lot of wild ones out there, but the one that clearly runs so contrary to what is possible, is atheism". Krauthammer opposed the Park51 project in Manhattan for "reasons of common decency and respect for the sacred. No commercial tower over Gettysburg, no convent at Auschwitz, and no mosque at Ground Zero. Build it anywhere but there." Krauthammer was critical of intelligent design, "a self-enclosed, tautological 'theory' whose only holding is that when there are gaps in some area of scientific knowledge — in this case, evolution — they are to be filled by God. It is a 'theory' that admits that evolution and natural selection explain such things as the development of drug resistance in bacteria and other such evolutionary changes within species, but that every once in a while God steps into this world of constant and accumulating change and says, 'I think I'll make me a lemur today.' A 'theory' that violates the most basic requirement of anything pretending to be science — that it be empirically disprovable." Of Kitzmiller v. Dover Area School District, he wrote: "Dover distinguished itself this Election Day by throwing out all eight members of its school board who tried to impose 'intelligent design' — today's tarted-up version of creationism — on the biology curriculum." Of the Kansas evolution hearings, he wrote: "In order to justify the farce that intelligent design is science, Kansas had to corrupt the very definition of science, dropping the phrase 'natural explanations for what we observe in the world around us,' thus unmistakably implying — by fiat of definition, no less — that the supernatural is an integral part of science. This is an insult both to religion and to science." He concluded:

How ridiculous to make evolution the enemy of God. What could be more elegant, more simple, more brilliant, more economical, more creative, indeed more divine than a planet with millions of life forms, distinct and yet interactive, all ultimately derived from accumulated variations in a single double-stranded molecule, pliable and fecund enough to give us mollusks and mice, Newton and Einstein? Even if it did give us the Kansas State Board of Education, too.

Krauthammer noted the scientific consensus on evolution, arguing that the religion–science controversy was a "false conflict".

=== Supreme Court nominations ===
Krauthammer criticized President George W. Bush's 2005 nomination of Harriet Miers to succeed Supreme Court Justice Sandra Day O'Connor. He called the nomination of Miers a "mistake" on several occasions. He noted her lack of constitutional experience as the main obstacle to her nomination.

On October 21, 2005, Krauthammer published "Miers: The Only Exit Strategy", in which he explained that all of Miers's relevant constitutional writings are protected by both attorney–client privilege and executive privilege, which presented a unique face-saving solution to the mistake: "Miers withdraws out of respect for both the Senate and the executive's prerogatives." Six days later, Miers withdrew, employing that argument:

As I stated in my acceptance remarks in the Oval Office, the strength and independence of our three branches of government are critical to the continued success of this great Nation. Repeatedly in the course of the process of confirmation for nominees for other positions, I have steadfastly maintained that the independence of the Executive Branch be preserved and its confidential documents and information not be released to further a confirmation process. I feel compelled to adhere to this position, especially related to my own nomination. Protection of the prerogatives of the Executive Branch and continued pursuit of my confirmation are in tension. I have decided that seeking my confirmation should yield.

The same day, NPR noted, "Krauthammer's scenario played out almost exactly as he wrote." Columnist E. J. Dionne wrote that the White House was following Krauthammer's strategy "almost to the letter". A few weeks later, The New York Times reported that Krauthammer's "exit strategy" was "exactly what happened" and that Krauthammer "had no prior inkling from the administration that they were taking that route; he was later given credit for giving the Bush administration a plan."

=== Other issues ===
Krauthammer was an opponent of capital punishment, writing that "there is no convincing evidence that the death penalty deters. Murder rates in states with the death penalty are just as high as in neighboring states without it. In states where the death penalty has been introduced, murder rates do not, on average, go down. And in states where the death penalty has been abolished, murder rates do not go up. When something as barbaric as cold-blooded execution by the state makes no appreciable contribution to public safety, it deserves abolition." In 2017, Krauthammer argued in favor of a border wall at the Mexico–United States border.

== Works ==
- Cutting Edges: Making Sense of the Eighties, Random House (1988) ISBN 978-0394548012, ISBN 0394548019
- Democratic Realism: An American Foreign Policy for a Unipolar World (2004 speech)
- Things That Matter: Three Decades of Passions, Pastimes and Politics, Crown Forum (2013) ISBN 978-1770496538, ISBN 177049653X
- The Point of It All: A Lifetime of Great Loves and Endeavors (with Daniel Krauthammer), Crown Forum (2018) ISBN 978-1984825483, ISBN 1984825488

== Awards and accolades ==
Krauthammer's New Republic essays won him the "National Magazine Award for Essays and Criticism". The weekly column he began writing for The Washington Post in 1985 won him the Pulitzer Prize for commentary in 1987. On June 14, 1993, he was awarded the Honorary degree of Doctor of Letters from McGill University. In 1999, Krauthammer received the Golden Plate Award of the American Academy of Achievement. His acceptance speech at the 1999 Summit in Washington, D.C., is included in his book, The Point of It All: A Lifetime of Great Loves and Endeavors, published after his death.

In 2006, the Financial Times named Krauthammer the most influential commentator in America, stating that "Krauthammer has influenced US foreign policy for more than two decades." In 2009, Politico columnist Ben Smith wrote that Krauthammer had "emerged in the Age of Obama as a central conservative voice, the kind of leader of the opposition that economist and New York Times columnist Paul Krugman represented for the left during the Bush years: a coherent, sophisticated and implacable critic of the new president." In 2010, The New York Times columnist David Brooks said Krauthammer was "the most important conservative columnist." In 2011, former congressman and MSNBC host Joe Scarborough called him "without a doubt the most powerful force in American conservatism. He has [been] for two, three, four years."

In a December 2010, press conference, former president Bill Clinton – a Democrat – called Krauthammer "a brilliant man". Krauthammer responded, tongue-in-cheek, that "my career is done" and "I'm toast." Krauthammer also received the William F. Buckley Award for Media Excellence in 2013. Krauthammer's other awards included the People for the American Way's First Amendment Award, the Champion Media Award for Economic Understanding from Amos Tuck School of Business Administration, the first annual Bradley Prize, the 2002 "Mightier Pen" award from the Center for Security Policy, the 2004 Irving Kristol Award, and the 2009 Eric Breindel Award for Excellence in Opinion Journalism, an annual award given by the Eric Breindel Foundation.
