= Things That Matter: Three Decades of Passions, Pastimes and Politics =

2013 book by Charles Krauthammer

- Authors: Charles Krauthammer
- Audio read by: Charles Krauthammer; George Newbern
- Language: English
- Genre: Politics; News
- Publisher: Crown Forum
- Publication date: October 22, 2013
- Publication place: United States
- Pages: 400
- ISBN: 978-0385349192

Things That Matter: Three Decades of Passions, Pastimes and Politics is a nonfiction book by the Pulitzer Prize-winning journalist Charles Krauthammer. It was at the top on The New York Times Non-Fiction Best Sellers List for four weeks, in January 2014.

== Content ==
The book is a collection of essays written by Krauthammer over 30 years and includes essays originally published in The Washington Post, Time Magazine, The New Republic, and The Weekly Standard. It begins with a new introduction by the author.

The collection of articles is divided into four parts: personal, political, historical, and global. According to The National Review, it tackles "everything from embryo research to entitlement reform, from Halley’s Comet to border collies, from Christopher Columbus to Martin Luther King, from drone warfare to American decline."

== Critical reception ==
The book was on The New York Times Nonfiction Bestseller list for more than 38 weeks. It was Number 1 on the list for four weeks in January 2014. It sold more than one million copies.

In The American Spectator, Aaron Goldstein argued that the book "ought to matter" because "Krauthammer’s analysis of the issues that have mattered most over the past thirty years have more often been right than wrong." He also highlighted Krauthammer's essay about the FDR Memorial, where Krauthammer argued against portraying FDR in a wheelchair, drawing a parallel with Krauthammer's silence about his own use of a wheelchair.

In The Washington Times, Michael Taube praised the book, writing that the writing was 'fresh, intelligent, compelling and thought-provoking.' Writing for Commentary, Peter Wehner called it "a marvelous, and at times quite moving, collection," adding that these articles Krauthammer's voice "matters so very much." He concluded that the book was about 'the duties of citizenship in a free society.'
