= From Babel to Dragomans =

From Babel to Dragomans: Interpreting the Middle East
- Author: Bernard Lewis
- Language: English
- Subject: Middle East and the Islamic world
- Genre: Islamic history
- Publisher: Oxford University Press
- Publication date: May 2, 2004
- Publication place: United States
- Media type: Print (Hardcover, Paperback), E-book
- Pages: 456
- ISBN: 978-0195173369
- OCLC: 1171225675

From Babel to Dragomans: Interpreting the Middle East is a 2004 book written by Middle-East historian Bernard Lewis. The book comprises a series of scholarly essays and speeches given by Lewis over a period of four decades on the topic of the Middle East and the Islamic world.

== Contents ==
Chapter 1 : An Islamic mosque
Chapter 2 : From Babel to Dragomans
Chapter 3 : Middle East feasts
Chapter 4 : Iran in history
Chapter 5 : Palimpsests of Jewish history : Christian, Muslim and secular diaspora
Chapter 6 : Some notes on land, money and power in medieval Islam
Chapter 7 : An interpretation of Fatimid history
Chapter 8 : Propaganda in the pre-modern Middle East : a preliminary classification
Chapter 9 : Monarchy in the Middle East
Chapter 10 : Religion and murder in the Middle East
Chapter 11 : The Mughals and the Ottomans
Chapter 12 : Europe and the Turks : the civilization of the Ottoman empire
Chapter 13 : Europe and Islam : Muslim perceptions and experience
Chapter 14 : Cold war and detente in the sixteenth century
Chapter 15 : From pilgrims to tourists : a survey of Middle Eastern travel
Chapter 16 : The British mandate for Palestine in historical perspective
Chapter 17 : Pan-Arabism
Chapter 18 : The emergence of modern Israel
Chapter 19 : Orientalist notes on the Soviet-United Arab Republic Treaty of 27 May 1971
Chapter 20 : A taxonomy of group hatred
Chapter 21 : Islam and the West
Chapter 22 : The Middle East, westernized despite itself
Chapter 23 : The Middle East in world affairs
Chapter 24 : Friends and enemies : reflections after a war
Chapter 25 : Return to Cairo
Chapter 26 : Middle East at prayer
Chapter 27 : At the United Nations
Chapter 28 : The anti-Zionist resolution
Chapter 29 : Right and left in Lebanon
Chapter 30 : The Shi'a
Chapter 31 : Islamic revolution
Chapter 32 : The enemies of God
Chapter 33 : The roots of Muslim rage
Chapter 34 : The other Middle East problems
Chapter 35 : Did you say "American imperialism"? : power, weakness, and choices in the Middle East
Chapter 36 : The law of Islam
Chapter 37 : Not everybody hates Saddam
Chapter 38 : Mideast states : pawns no longer in imperial games
Chapter 39 : What Saddam wrought
Chapter 40 : The "sick man" of today coughs closer to home
Chapter 41 : Revisiting the paradox of modern Turkey
Chapter 42 : We must be clear
Chapter 43 : Deconstructing Osama and his evil appeal
Chapter 44 : Targeted by a history of hatred
Chapter 45 : A time for toppling
Chapter 46 : In defense of history
Chapter 47 : First-person narrative in the Middle East
Chapter 48 : Reflections on Islamic historiography
Chapter 49 : The Ottoman archives : a source for European history
Chapter 50 : History writing and national revival in Turkey
Chapter 51 : On Occidentalism and Orientalism
