= The Emergence of Modern Turkey =

1961 book by Bernard Lewis

- Author: Bernard Lewis
- Language: English
- Series: Studies in Middle Eastern History
- Subject: Turkey, Ottoman Empire
- Genre: Islamic history
- Publisher: Oxford University Press
- Publication date: 1961
- Publication place: United States
- Media type: Print (Hardcover, Paperback), E-book
- Pages: 568
- ISBN: 978-0195134605
- OCLC: 807778553

The Emergence of Modern Turkey is a 1961 book written by historian Bernard Lewis, an expert in the history of Middle East and Islam.

The book covers the history of modern Turkey, from the decline and collapse of the Ottoman Empire up to the present days.

== Contents ==
- Chapter I Introduction: the Sources of Turkish Civilization

Part I The Stages of Emergence

- Chapter II The Decline of the Ottoman Empire

Chapter III The Impact of the West
Chapter IV The Ottoman Reform
Chapter V The Seeds of Revolution
Chapter VI Despotism and Enlightenment
Chapter VII Union and Progress
Chapter VIII The Kemalist Republic
Chapter IX The Republic after Kemal

Part II Aspects of Change

Chapter X Community and Nation
Chapter XI State and Government
Chapter XII Religion and Culture
Chapter XIII Elite and Class
Chapter XIV Conclusions: The Turkish Revolution
- Select Bibliography
- Maps
