= Race and Slavery in the Middle East =

Race and Slavery in the Middle East: A Historical Enquiry
- Author: Bernard Lewis
- Language: English
- Genre: Historical non-fiction
- Publisher: Oxford University Press
- Publication date: August 1990
- Publication place: United States
- Media type: Hardcover
- Pages: 200
- ISBN: 978-0-19-506283-0 (1990 hardcover edition)
- OCLC: 423210596
- Dewey Decimal: 306.3/62/0956 20
- LC Class: HT1316 .L48 1990

Race and Slavery in the Middle East: an Historical Enquiry is a 1990 book written by the British historian Bernard Lewis. The book details the Islamic history of slavery in the Middle East from its earliest incarnations until its abolition in the various countries of the region.

Though the book details specifically the role that Islam has had in slavery in the Middle East, the author offers a brief statement at the beginning of the book stating that there were other religions who sanctioned slavery in their history such as Christianity, Judaism, Zoroastrianism, and pagan religions.

== Quote ==
In 1842 the British Consul General in Morocco, as part of his government's worldwide endeavor to bring about the abolition of slavery or at least the curtailment of the slave trade, made representations to the sultan of that country asking him what measures, if any, he had taken to accomplish this desirable objective. The sultan replied, in a letter expressing evident astonishment, that "the traffic in slaves is a matter on which all sects and nations have agreed from the time of the sons of Adam up to this day." The sultan continued that he was "not aware of its being prohibited by the laws of any sect, and no one need ask this question, the same being manifest to both high and low and requires no more demonstration than the light of day." The sultan was only slightly out of date concerning the enactment of laws to abolish or limit the slave trade, and he was sadly right in his general historic perspective.

== Chapters ==
- Chapter 1. Slavery (available on-line)
- Chapter 2. Race
- Chapter 3. Islam in Arabia
- Chapter 4. Prejudice and Piety. Literature and Law
- Chapter 5. Conquest and Enslavement
- Chapter 6. Ventures in Ethnology
- Chapter 7. The Discovery of Africa.
- Chapter 8. In Black and White
- Chapter 9. Slaves in Arms (available on-line)
- Chapter 10. The Nineteenth Century and After
- Chapter 11. Abolition
- Chapter 12. Equality and Marriage,
- Chapter 13. Image and Stereotype.
- Chapter 14. Myth and Reality

== See also ==
- Islamic views on slavery
- Arab slave trade
