= Irving Kristol Award =

Award conferred by the American Enterprise Institute

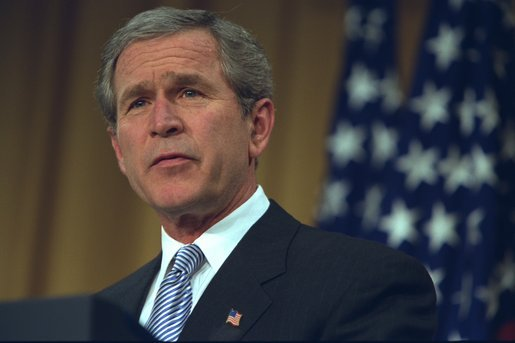
George W. Bush speaks at AEI's Annual Dinner in 2003.

The Irving Kristol Award is the highest honor conferred by the American Enterprise Institute for Public Policy Research.

The award is given for "notable intellectual or practical contributions to improved public policy and social welfare" and named in honor of Irving Kristol. It replaced the Francis Boyer Award in 2003. The award was named for Kristol as a tribute to his influence on public issues and as an intellectual mentor to several generations of conservatives. According to Christopher DeMuth, "In our sixty years of labors, no one has had a more profound influence on the work of the American Enterprise Institute, or on American political discourse, than Irving Kristol. Combining philosophical depth with intense practicality and constant good cheer, [Kristol] has, as President Bush has put it, 'transformed political debate on every subject he approached, from economics to religion, from social welfare to foreign policy.'"

The Kristol Award is presented at AEI's Annual Dinner, a gala dinner in Washington, D.C., that is well-attended by conservative leaders and is a major event on the Washington social scene. President George W. Bush spoke at the first Kristol Award presentation in 2003. Bush's speech, only days before the commencement of the Iraq War, laid out his promise to launch military action even if the United Nations Security Council did not authorize it. Former vice president Dick Cheney and former Spanish prime minister Jose Maria Aznar have also presented the award.

Kristol Award recipients occasionally make news with their speeches. John Howard, who had a few months before been defeated in the Australian elections, criticized his successor as prime minister, Kevin Rudd, over industrial relations and the Iraq War.

All recipients are given a token of esteem engraved with a citation for their achievements.

== List of recipients ==
| Year | Recipient | Nationality | Citation | Lecture title |
|---|---|---|---|---|
| 2003 | Allan H. Meltzer | American | "To Allan H. Meltzer; Pioneer of political economy and policy reform Teacher to students, scholars, and statesmen Intellectual leader in the causes of liberty and progress" | "Leadership and Progress" |
| 2004 | Charles Krauthammer | American | "To Charles Krauthammer; Fearless journalist, wise analyst, and militant democrat Who has shown that America's interests and ideals are indivisible And that the promotion of freedom is hard-headed realism" | "Democratic Realism " |
| 2005 | Mario Vargas Llosa | Peruvian | "To Mario Vargas Llosa; Whose narrative art and political thought Illumine the universal quest for freedom-- Which the virtues love and the follies require." | "Confessions of a Liberal " |
| 2006 | David Hackett Fischer | American | "To David Hackett Fischer; Student, teacher, and storyteller Whose histories revivify the American past And teach us that her future is a story we are telling" | |
| 2007 | Bernard Lewis | British; American | "To Bernard Lewis; Who has stood at the Bosporus for seventy years Historian and interpreter across the great divide Sage of our pasts, presage of our future." | "Europe and Islam " |
| 2008 | John Howard | Australian | "To John Winston Howard; Stalwart all-rounder of politics and policy Who made good government a popular cause And advanced Australia fair and free" | "Keeping Faith with Our Common Values" |
| 2009 | Charles Murray | American | "To Charles Murray; Exemplary social scientist Whose measurements are means to moral understanding Engaged Aristotelian; Who teaches of human heritage and pursuit" | "The Happiness of the People " |
| 2010 | David Petraeus | American | | "The Surge of Ideas: COINdinistas and Change in the U.S. Army in 2006 " |
| 2011 | Martin Feldstein | American | | "America's Challenge" |
| 2012 | Leon Kass | American | | "The other war on poverty: Finding meaning in America" |
| 2013 | Paul Ryan | American | | "Conservatism and Community" |
| 2014 | Eugene Fama | American | | Eugene F. Fama presentation |
| 2015 | Benjamin Netanyahu | Israeli | | A conversation with Benjamin Netanyahu |
| 2016 | Robert P. George | American | | A conversation with Irving Kristol honoree Robby George |
| 2017 | Jonathan Sacks | British | | 2017 Annual Dinner speech |
| 2018 | Boris Johnson | British | | 2018 Annual Dinner speech |
| 2019 | Nikki Haley | American | | 2019 Annual Dinner speech |
| 2020 | Nicholas Eberstadt | American | | America after COVID-19: Which future? |
| 2021 | Mary Ann Glendon | American | | 2021 Irving Kristol Award Presentation |
| 2022 | Arthur C. Brooks | American | | 2022 Annual Dinner speech |
| 2023 | Paul Gigot | American | | 2023 Annual Dinner speech |
| 2024 | Mitch McConnell | American | | 2024 Annual Dinner speech |
| 2025 | Gordon S. Wood | American | | 2025 Annual Dinner speech |
