= The Crisis of Islam =

2004 book by Bernard Lewis

The Crisis of Islam: Holy War and Unholy Terror
- Author: Bernard Lewis
- Language: English
- Genre: Non-fiction
- Publication date: November 2001

The Crisis of Islam: Holy War and Unholy Terror is a book written by Bernard Lewis. The nucleus of the book was an article published in The New Yorker in November 2001.

== Content ==
According to the author, the Islamic world is locked in an internal struggle over how best to address and ultimately solve the problems endemic to many of its societies: namely, widespread poverty, extreme economic inequality, the prevalence of government by despotic rulers, and the inability to keep pace with emerging economies. The crisis concerns the choice the Islamic world faces between two diametrically opposed solutions.

Opposing those within Islam who argue for the continued and peaceful spread of economic and political freedoms as a means to solve these problems are the various Muslim fundamentalist movements, most notably Wahhabism, which blame all of these ills on whatever modernization and Western influence the Islamic world has already embraced, and advocate an unreserved rejection of the West. This rejection includes violence against Western countries and interests, and most especially violence against "impious" Muslim rulers who have adopted "Western" ways. The fundamentalists seek the establishment of states and societies based on Islamic Law and traditional mores.

The author warns that the resolution of this struggle between Western and anti-Western influences within the Islamic world will determine whether the Islamic world takes its place alongside other countries in a global community, or whether it will regress into backwardness and intractable conflict with non-Muslim nations.

== Criticism ==
As'ad AbuKhalil, in a review article, sees the book as a recycling of Lewis's 1976 Commentary article titled "The Return of Islam". He further notes that: "in this piece, Lewis exhibits his adherence to the most discredited forms of classical Orientalist dogmas by invoking such terms as "the modern Western mind." [...] For Lewis, the Muslim mind never seems to change. Every Muslim, or any Muslim, regardless of geography or time, is representative of any or all Muslims. Thus, a quotation from an obscure medieval source is sufficient to explain present day behavior". AbuKhalil further notes that: "Methodologically, [Lewis] insists that terrorism by individual Muslims should be considered Islamic terrorism, while terrorism by individual Jews or Christians is never considered Jewish or Christian terrorism."

== Bibliography ==
- AbuKhalil, A. (2004). ""The Islam Industry" and Scholarship: Review Article". Middle East Journal. 58 (1): 130–137.
