= What Went Wrong? =

2002 book by Bernard Lewis

What Went Wrong?: The Clash Between Islam and Modernity in the Middle East
- Author: Bernard Lewis
- Language: English
- Subject: Islam and modernity
- Genre: Islamic history
- Publisher: Harper Perennial
- Publication date: November 7, 2002
- Publication place: United States
- Media type: Print (Hardcover, Paperback), E-book
- Pages: 208
- ISBN: 978-0060516055
- OCLC: 751234378

What Went Wrong?: The Clash Between Islam and Modernity in the Middle East is a book by Bernard Lewis released in January 2002, shortly after the September 11 terrorist attack, but written shortly before. The nucleus of this book appeared as an article published in The Atlantic Monthly in January 2002.

The book's thesis is that throughout recent history, specifically beginning with the failure of the second Ottoman siege of Vienna in 1683, the Islamic world has failed to modernize or to keep pace with the Western world in a variety of respects, and that this failure has been seen by many within the Islamic world as having allowed Western powers to acquire a disastrous position of dominance over those regions.

== See also ==
- Islam and modernity
