= The Assassins: A Radical Sect in Islam =

1967 history book by Bernard Lewis

- 2002 edition
- Author: Bernard Lewis
- Language: English
- Subject: Assassins
- Genre: History
- Publisher: Weidenfeld & Nicolson, Oxford University Press, Basic Books
- Publication date: 1967, 1987, 2002
- Media type: Print
- Pages: 166 (3rd ed.)
- ISBN: 9780465004980 (3rd ed.)
- OCLC: 1740057
- Dewey Decimal: 297.822

The Assassins: A Radical Sect in Islam is a book, first published in 1967, written by Middle-East historian Bernard Lewis, and published by Weidenfeld & Nicolson. An updated edition was published by Oxford University Press in 1987, and another in 2002 by Basic Books.

== Description ==
Lewis, a British-American professor of history at Princeton University, traces the history of the secret Islamic sect known as the Assassins, an order of the Nizari Ismailis that used assassinations throughout the Middle Ages to achieve political, military, and religious goals.

The book has been noted for its arguments linking the early assassins with modern Islamic terrorism.
