= Bernard Lewis =

British-American historian (1916–2018)

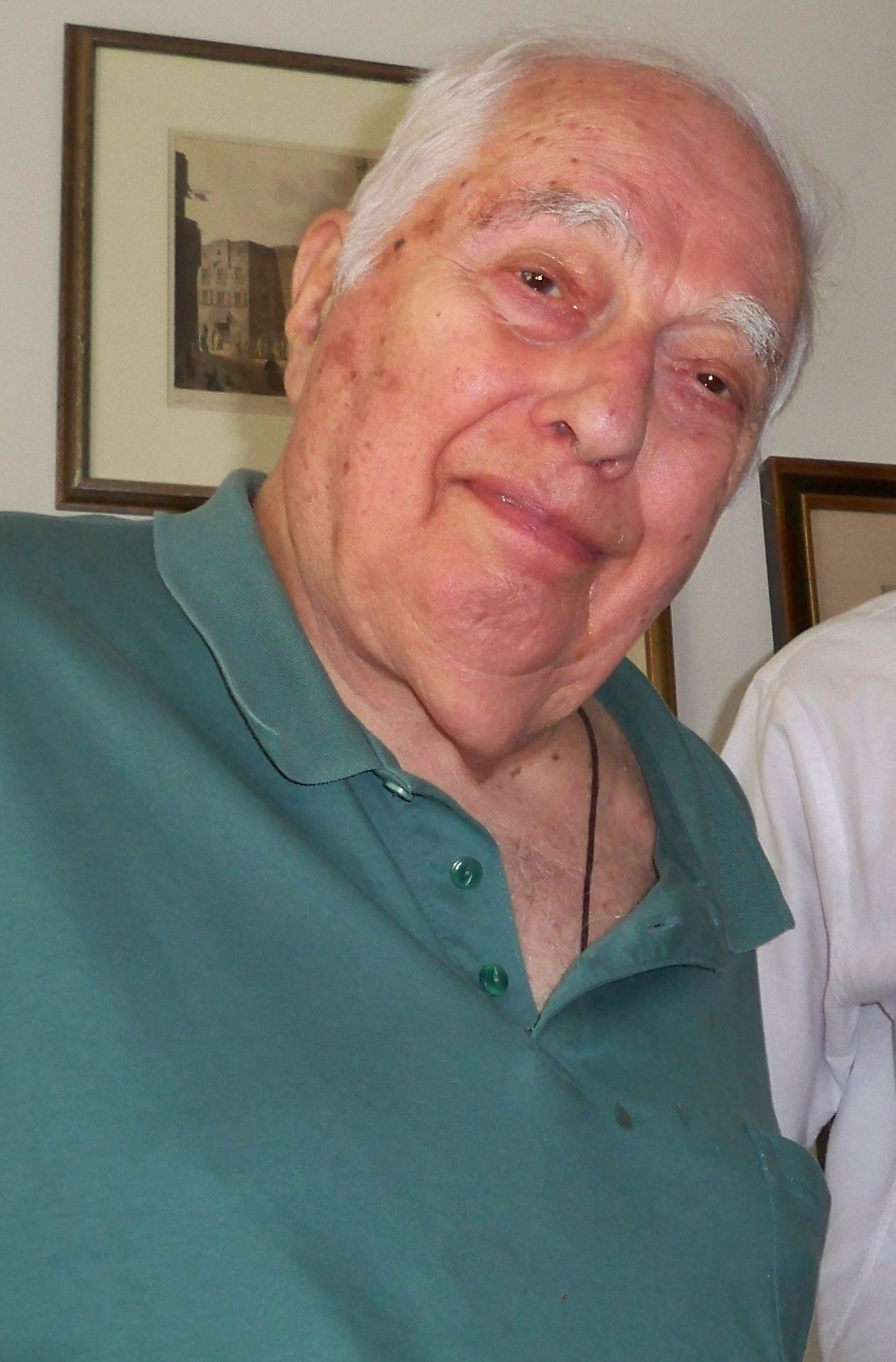
- Lewis in 2012
- Born: 31 May 1916; London, England
- Died: 19 May 2018 (aged 101); Voorhees Township, New Jersey, U.S.
- Spouse(s): Ruth Hélène Oppenhejm (married 1947–1974)
- Children: 2
- Awards: Fellow of the British Academy; Harvey Prize; Irving Kristol Award; Jefferson Lecture; National Humanities Medal

Academic background
- Education: SOAS (BA, PhD); University of Paris

Academic work
- Discipline: Historian
- Institutions: SOAS; Princeton University; Cornell University
- Doctoral students: Feroz Ahmad
- Main interests: Middle Eastern studies, Islamic studies
- Notable works: The Jews of Islam (1984); Islam and the West (1993); What Went Wrong? (2002)
- Influenced: Heath W. Lowry, Fouad Ajami

Bernard Lewis (31 May 1916 – 19 May 2018) was a British-American historian who specialized in Oriental studies. He was also known as a public intellectual and political commentator. Lewis was the Cleveland E. Dodge Professor Emeritus of Near Eastern Studies at Princeton University. Lewis's expertise was in the history of Islam and the interaction between Islam and the West.

Lewis served as a soldier in the British Army in the Royal Armoured Corps and Intelligence Corps during the Second World War before being seconded to the Foreign Office. After the war, he returned to the School of Oriental and African Studies at the University of London and was appointed to the new chair in Near and Middle Eastern history.

In 2007, Lewis was called "the West's leading interpreter of the Middle East". Others have said Lewis's approach is essentialist and generalizing to the Muslim world, as well as his tendency to restate hypotheses that were challenged by more recent research. On a political level, Lewis's detractors say he revived the image of the cultural inferiority of Islam and of emphasizing the dangers of jihad. His advice was frequently sought by neoconservative policymakers, including the Bush administration. His active support of the Iraq War and neoconservative ideals have since come under scrutiny.

He was notable for his public debates with Edward Said, who said Lewis was a Zionist apologist and an Orientalist who "demeaned" Arabs, misrepresented Islam, and promoted Western imperialism, to which Lewis responded by saying Orientalism was a facet of humanism and that Said was politicizing the subject.

Lewis was also known for denying the Armenian genocide. His argument that there was no evidence of a deliberate genocide carried out against the Armenian people by the Ottoman Empire is rejected by other historians. He said that the mass killings resulted from a mutual struggle between two nationalistic movements, a view that has been criticized as "ahistorical".

== Early life, family and education ==
Bernard Lewis was born on 31 May 1916 to middle-class British Jewish parents, Harry and Jane (née Levy) Lewis, in Stoke Newington, London. He became interested in languages and history while preparing for his bar mitzvah.

In 1936, Lewis graduated from the University of London's School of Oriental Studies, the predecessor of School of Oriental and African Studies (SOAS), with a BA in history with special reference to the Near and Middle East. He received his PhD three years later at SOAS, specializing in the history of Islam. Lewis also studied law, going part of the way toward becoming a solicitor, but returned to study Middle Eastern history. He undertook post-graduate studies at the University of Paris, where he studied with the orientalist Louis Massignon and earned his Diplôme des Études Sémitiques in 1937.

== Career ==
Lewis worked at his alma mater the University of London's School of Oriental Studies, the predecessor of School of Oriental and African Studies (SOAS), in 1938 as an assistant lecturer in Islamic History.

During the Second World War, he served in the British Army in the Royal Armoured Corps and as a corporal in the Intelligence Corps in 1940–41 before being seconded to the Foreign Office.

After the war, he returned to SOAS, where he would remain for the next 25 years. In 1949, at the age of 33, he was appointed to the new chair in Near and Middle Eastern History. In 1963, Lewis was granted fellowship of the British Academy.

In 1974, aged 57, Lewis accepted a joint position at Princeton University and the Institute for Advanced Study (also located in Princeton, New Jersey). The terms of his appointment were such that Lewis taught only one semester per year. Being free from administrative responsibilities, he could devote more time to research than previously. Lewis's arrival in Princeton marked the beginning of the most prolific period in his research career during which he published numerous books and articles based on previously accumulated materials. After retiring from Princeton in 1986, Lewis served at Cornell University until 1990.

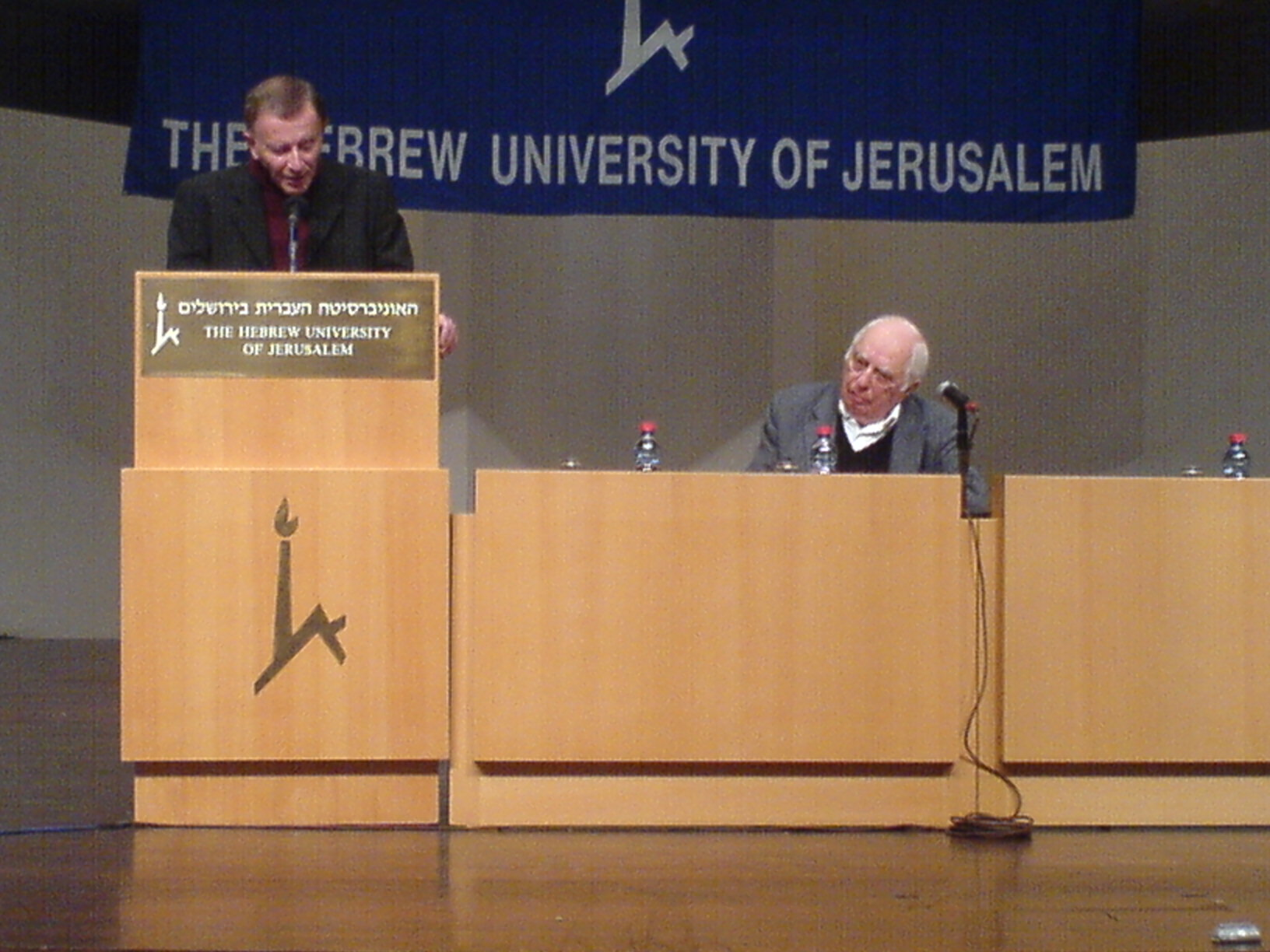
Bernard Lewis in 2007

In 1966, Lewis was a founding member of the learned society Middle East Studies Association of North America (MESA). However, in 2007, he broke away and founded Association for the Study of the Middle East and Africa (ASMEA) to challenge MESA, which The New York Sun noted as "dominated by academics who have been critical of Israel and of America's role in the Middle East".

In 1990, the National Endowment for the Humanities selected Lewis for the Jefferson Lecture, the US government's highest honor for achievement in the humanities. His lecture, "Western Civilization: A View from the East", was revised and reprinted in The Atlantic Monthly under the title "The Roots of Muslim Rage." His 2007 Irving Kristol Lecture, given to the American Enterprise Institute, was published as Europe and Islam.

== Research ==
Lewis's influence extends beyond academia to the general public. He began his research career with the study of medieval Arab, especially Syrian, history. His first article, dedicated to professional guilds of medieval Islam, had been widely regarded as the most authoritative work on the subject for about thirty years. However, after the establishment of the state of Israel in 1948, scholars of Jewish origin found it more and more difficult to conduct archival and field research in Arab countries, where they were suspected of espionage. Therefore, Lewis switched to the study of the Ottoman Empire, while continuing to research Arab history through the Ottoman archives which had only recently been opened to Western researchers. A series of articles that Lewis published over the next several years revolutionized the history of the Middle East by giving a broad picture of Islamic society, including its government, economy, and demographics.

Lewis argued that the Middle East is currently backward and its decline was a largely self-inflicted condition resulting from both culture and religion, as opposed to the post-colonialist view which posits the problems of the region as economic and political maldevelopment mainly due to the 19th-century European colonization. In his 1982 work Muslim Discovery of Europe, Lewis argues that Muslim societies could not keep pace with the West and that "Crusader successes were due in no small part to Muslim weakness." Further, he suggested that as early as the 11th century Islamic societies were decaying, primarily the byproduct of internal problems like "cultural arrogance," which was a barrier to creative borrowing, rather than external pressures like the Crusades.

In the wake of Soviet and Arab attempts to delegitimize Israel as a racist country, Lewis wrote a study of antisemitism, Semites and Anti-Semites (1986). In other works he argued Arab rage against Israel was disproportionate to other tragedies or injustices in the Muslim world, such as the Soviet invasion of Afghanistan and control of Muslim-majority land in Central Asia, the bloody and destructive fighting during the Hama uprising in Syria (1982), the Algerian Civil War (1992–1998), and the Iran–Iraq War (1980–1988).

External videos
- Booknotes interview with Lewis on What Went Wrong?, 30 December 2001, C-SPAN

In addition to his scholarly works, Lewis wrote several influential books accessible to the general public: The Arabs in History (1950), The Middle East and the West (1964), and The Middle East (1995). In the wake of the 11 September 2001 attacks, the interest in Lewis's work surged, especially his 1990 essay The Roots of Muslim Rage. Three of his books were published after 9/11: What Went Wrong? (written before the attacks), which explored the reasons of the Muslim world's apprehension of (and sometimes outright hostility to) modernization; The Crisis of Islam; and Islam: The Religion and the People.

Abraham Udovitch described him as "certainly the most eminent and respected historian of the Arab world, of the Islamic world, of the Middle East and beyond".

Columbia University historian Richard Bulliet said that Bernard Lewis "looked down on modern Arabs" and suggested that he considers them "worthy only to a degree they follow a Western path." Edward Said called him a Zionist apologist and an orientalist who "demeaned" Arabs.

=== Armenian genocide ===
The first two editions of Lewis's The Emergence of Modern Turkey (1961 and 1968) describe the Armenian genocide as "the terrible holocaust of 1915, when a million and a half Armenians perished". In later editions, this text is altered to "the terrible slaughter of 1915, when, according to estimates, more than a million Armenians perished, as well as an unknown number of Turks". In this passage, Lewis argues that the deaths were the result of a struggle for the same land between two competing nationalist movements.

The change in Lewis's textual description of the Armenian genocide and his signing of the petition against the Congressional resolution was controversial among some Armenian historians as well as journalists, who suggested that Lewis was engaging in historical negationism to serve his own political and personal interests.

Lewis called the label "genocide" the "Armenian version of this history" in a November 1993 interview with Le Monde, for which he faced a civil proceeding in a French court under the Gayssot Law. The prosecution failed because the court determined that the law did not apply to events before World War II. In a 1995 civil proceeding brought by three Armenian genocide survivors, a French court censured Lewis' remarks under Article 1382 of the Civil Code and fined him one franc, and ordering the publication of the judgment at Lewis' cost in Le Monde. The court ruled that while Lewis has the right to his views, their expression harmed a third party and that "it is only by hiding elements which go against his thesis that the defendant was able to state there was no 'serious proof' of the Armenian Genocide". Three other court cases against Bernard Lewis failed in the Paris tribunal, including one filed by the Armenian National Committee of France and two filed by Jacques Trémollet de Villers.

Lewis's views on the Armenian genocide were criticized by a number of historians and sociologists, among them Alain Finkielkraut, Yves Ternon, Richard G. Hovannisian, Robert Melson, and Pierre Vidal-Naquet.

Lewis did not deny that large numbers of murders took place, but he denied that they were a purposeful Young Turk government policy and therefore they should not be categorized as a genocide. In 2002, he argued for his denial stance:

This is a question of definition and nowadays the word "genocide" is used very loosely even in cases where no bloodshed is involved at all and I can understand the annoyance of those who feel refused. But in this particular case, the point that was being made was that the massacre of the Armenians in the Ottoman Empire was the same as what happened to Jews in Nazi Germany and that is a downright falsehood. What happened to the Armenians was the result of a massive Armenian armed rebellion against the Turks, which began even before war broke out, and continued on a larger scale. Great numbers of Armenians, including members of the armed forces, deserted, crossed the frontier and joined the Russian forces invading Turkey. Armenian rebels actually seized the city of Van and held it for a while intending to hand it over to the invaders. There was guerilla warfare all over Anatolia. And it is what we nowadays call the National Movement of Armenians Against Turkey. The Turks certainly resorted to very ferocious methods in repelling it. There is clear evidence of a decision by the Turkish Government, to deport the Armenian population from the sensitive areas. Which meant naturally the whole of Anatolia. Not including the Arab provinces which were then still part of the Ottoman Empire. There is no evidence of a decision to massacre. On the contrary, there is considerable evidence of attempt to prevent it, which were not very successful. Yes there were tremendous massacres, the numbers are very uncertain but a million nay may well be likely. [and] The massacres were carried out by irregulars, by local villagers responding to what had been done to them and in number of other ways. But to make this, a parallel with the holocaust in Germany, you would have to assume the Jews of Germany had been engaged in an armed rebellion against the German state, collaborating with the allies against Germany. That in the deportation order the cities of Hamburg and Berlin were exempted, persons in the employment of state were exempted, and the deportation only applied to the Jews of Germany proper, so that when they got to Poland they were welcomed and sheltered by the Polish Jews. This seems to me a rather absurd parallel.

Lewis has been labelled a "genocide denier" by Stephen Zunes, Israel Charny, David B. MacDonald and the Armenian National Committee of America. Israeli historian Yair Auron suggested that "Lewis' stature provided a lofty cover for the Turkish national agenda of obfuscating academic research on the Armenian Genocide". Israel Charny wrote that Lewis's "seemingly scholarly concern ... of Armenians constituting a threat to the Turks as a rebellious force who together with the Russians threatened the Ottoman Empire, and the insistence that only a policy of deportations was executed, barely conceal the fact that the organized deportations constituted systematic mass murder". Charny compares the "logical structures" employed by Lewis in his denial of the genocide to those employed by Ernst Nolte in his Holocaust negationism. Lewis has also falsely implied that the Armenians had military and police forces at their disposal, whom they could have called upon, when, in reality, they had no such forces at all.

== Views and influence on contemporary politics ==
In the mid-1960s, Lewis emerged as a commentator on the issues of the modern Middle East and his analysis of the Israeli–Palestinian conflict and the rise of militant Islam brought him publicity and aroused significant controversy. American historian Joel Beinin has called him "perhaps the most articulate and learned Zionist advocate in the North American Middle East academic community". Lewis's policy advice had particular weight thanks to this scholarly authority. U.S. vice president Dick Cheney remarked "in this new century, his wisdom is sought daily by policymakers, diplomats, fellow academics, and the news media".

A harsh critic of the Soviet Union, Lewis continued the liberal tradition in Islamic historical studies. Although his early Marxist views had a bearing on his first book The Origins of Ismailism, Lewis subsequently discarded Marxism. His later works are a reaction against the left-wing current of Third-worldism which came to be a significant current in Middle Eastern studies.

During his career Lewis developed ties with governments around the world: during her time as Prime Minister of Israel, Golda Meir assigned Lewis's articles as reading to her cabinet members, and during the presidency of George W. Bush, he advised administration members including Cheney, Donald Rumsfeld and Bush himself. He was also close to King Hussein of Jordan and his brother, Prince Hassan bin Talal. He also had ties to the regime of Mohammad Reza Pahlavi, the last Shah of Iran, the Turkish military dictatorship led by Kenan Evren, and the Egyptian government of Anwar Sadat: he acted as a go-between between the Sadat administration and Israel in 1971 when he relayed a message to the Israeli government regarding the possibility of a peace agreement at the request of Sadat's spokesman Tahasin Bashir.

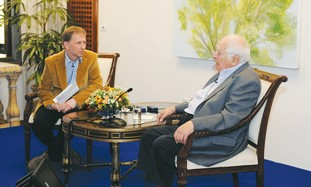
David Horovitz interviewing Bernard Lewis in 2011

Lewis advocated closer Western ties with Israel and Turkey, which he saw as especially important in light of the extension of the Soviet influence in the Middle East. Modern Turkey holds a special place in Lewis's view of the region due to the country's efforts to become a part of the West. He was an Honorary Fellow of the Institute of Turkish Studies, an honor which is given "on the basis of generally recognized scholarly distinction and ... long and devoted service to the field of Turkish Studies."

Lewis views Christendom and Islam as civilizations that have been in perpetual collision since the advent of Islam in the 7th century. In his essay The Roots of Muslim Rage (1990), he argued that the struggle between the West and Islam was gathering strength. According to one source, this essay (and Lewis's 1990 Jefferson Lecture on which the article was based) first introduced the term "Islamic fundamentalism" to North America. This essay has been credited with coining the phrase "clash of civilizations", which received prominence in the eponymous book by Samuel Huntington. However, another source indicates that Lewis first used the phrase "clash of civilizations" at a 1957 meeting in Washington where it was recorded in the transcript.

In 1998, Lewis read in a London-based newspaper Al-Quds Al-Arabi a declaration of war on the United States by Osama bin Laden. In his essay "A License to Kill", Lewis indicated he considered bin Laden's language as the "ideology of jihad" and warned that bin Laden would be a danger to the West. The essay was published after the Clinton administration and the US intelligence community had begun its hunt for bin Laden in Sudan and then in Afghanistan.

Some of his views have been likened to the Eurabia thesis, such as warning that Europe would turn Muslim by the end of the century, becoming "part of the Arab West, the Maghreb", and his 2007 pamphlet Europe and Islam said demographic changes could be realized "in the foreseeable future."

=== Jihad ===
Lewis writes of jihad as a distinct religious obligation, but suggests that it is a pity that people engaging in terrorist activities are not more aware of their own religion:

The fanatical warrior offering his victims the choice of the Koran or the sword is not only untrue, it is impossible. The alleged choice—conversion or death—is also, with rare and atypical exceptions, untrue. Muslim tolerance of unbelievers and misbelievers was far better than anything available in Christendom until the rise of secularism in the 17th century.

Muslim fighters are commanded not to kill women, children, or the aged unless they attack first; not to torture or otherwise ill-treat prisoners; to give fair warnings of the opening of hostilities or their resumption after a truce; and to honor agreements. At no time did the classical jurists offer any approval or legitimacy to what we nowadays call terrorism. Nor indeed is there any evidence of the use of terrorism as it is practiced nowadays.

The emergence of the by now widespread terrorism practice of suicide bombing is a development of the 20th century. It has no antecedents in Islamic history, and no justification in the terms of Islamic theology, law, or tradition.

As'ad AbuKhalil, has criticized this view and stated: "Methodologically, [Lewis] insists that terrorism by individual Muslims should be considered Islamic terrorism, while terrorism by individual Jews or Christians is never considered Jewish or Christian terrorism."

He also criticised Lewis's understanding of Osama bin Laden, seeing Lewis's interpretation of bin Laden "as some kind of influential Muslim theologian" along the lines of classical theologians like Al-Ghazali, rather than "the terrorist fanatic that he is". AbuKhalil has also criticized the place of Islam in Lewis's worldview more generally, arguing that the most prominent feature of his work was its "theologocentrism" (borrowing a term from Maxime Rodinson)—that Lewis interprets all aspects of behavior among Muslims solely through the lens of Islamic theology, subsuming the study of Muslim peoples, their languages, the geographical areas where Muslims predominate, Islamic governments, the governments of Arab countries and Sharia under the label of "Islam".

=== Debates with Edward Said ===
Lewis was known for his literary debates with Edward Said, the Palestinian American literary theorist whose aim was to analyze and criticize Orientalist scholarship. Said, who was a professor at Columbia University, characterized Lewis's work as a prime example of Orientalism in his 1978 book Orientalism and in his later book Covering Islam: How the Media and the Experts Determine How We See the Rest of the World (1981). Said asserted that the field of Orientalism was political intellectualism bent on self-affirmation rather than objective study, a form of racism, and a tool of imperialist domination. He further questioned the scientific neutrality of some leading Middle East scholars, including Lewis, on the Arab World. In an interview with Al-Ahram weekly, Said suggested that Lewis's knowledge of the Middle East was so biased that it could not be taken seriously and claimed "Bernard Lewis hasn't set foot in the Middle East, in the Arab world, for at least 40 years. He knows something about Turkey, I'm told, but he knows nothing about the Arab world." Said considered that Lewis treats Islam as a monolithic entity without the nuance of its plurality, internal dynamics, and historical complexities, and accused him of "demagogy and downright ignorance". In Covering Islam, Said argued that "Lewis simply cannot deal with the diversity of Muslim, much less human life, because it is closed to him as something foreign, radically different, and other," and he criticised Lewis's "inability to grant that the Islamic peoples are entitled to their own cultural, political, and historical practices, free from Lewis's calculated attempt to show that because they are not Western... they can't be good."

Rejecting the view that Western scholarship was biased against the Middle East, Lewis responded that Orientalism developed as a facet of European humanism, independently of the past European imperial expansion. He noted the French and English pursued the study of Islam in the 16th and 17th centuries, yet not in an organized way, but long before they had any control or hope of control in the Middle East; and that much of Orientalist study did nothing to advance the cause of imperialism. In his 1993 book Islam and the West, Lewis wrote "What imperial purpose was served by deciphering the ancient Egyptian language, for example, and then restoring to the Egyptians knowledge of and pride in their forgotten, ancient past?" Furthermore, Lewis accused Said of politicizing the scientific study of the Middle East (and Arabic studies in particular); neglecting to critique the scholarly findings of the Orientalists; and giving "free rein" to his biases.

=== Stance on the Iraq War ===
In 2002, Lewis wrote an article for The Wall Street Journal regarding the buildup to the Iraq War entitled "Time for Toppling", where he stated his opinion that "a regime change may well be dangerous, but sometimes the dangers of inaction are greater than those of action". In 2007, Jacob Weisberg described Lewis as "perhaps the most significant intellectual influence behind the invasion of Iraq". Michael Hirsh attributed to Lewis the view that regime change in Iraq would provide a jolt that would "modernize the Middle East" and suggested that Lewis's allegedly 'orientalist' theories about "what went wrong" in the Middle East, and other writings, formed the intellectual basis of the push towards war in Iraq. Hirsch reported that Lewis had told him in an interview that he viewed the 11 September attacks as "the opening salvo of the final battle" between Western and Islamic civilisations: Lewis believed that a forceful response was necessary. In the run up to the Iraq War, he met with Vice President Dick Cheney several times: Hirsch quoted an unnamed official who was present at a number of these meetings, who summarised Lewis's view of Iraq as "Get on with it. Don't dither". Brent Scowcroft quoted Lewis as stating that he believed "that one of the things you've got to do to Arabs is hit them between the eyes with a big stick. They respect power". As'ad AbuKhalil has claimed that Lewis assured Cheney that American troops would be welcomed by Iraqis and Arabs, relying on the opinion of his colleague Fouad Ajami. Hirsch also drew parallels between the Bush administration's plans for post-invasion Iraq and Lewis's views, in particular his admiration for Mustafa Kemal Atatürk's secularist and Westernising reforms in the new Republic of Turkey which emerged from the collapse of the Ottoman Empire.

Writing in 2008, Lewis did not advocate imposing freedom and democracy on Islamic nations. "There are things you can't impose. Freedom, for example. Or democracy. Democracy is a very strong medicine which has to be administered to the patient in small, gradually increasing doses. Otherwise, you risk killing the patient. In the main, the Muslims have to do it themselves."

Ian Buruma, writing for The New Yorker in an article subtitled "The two Minds of Bernard Lewis", finds Lewis's stance on the war difficult to reconcile with Lewis's past statements cautioning democracy enforcement in the world at large. Buruma ultimately rejects suggestions by his peers that Lewis promotes war with Iraq to safeguard Israel, but instead concludes "perhaps he loves it [the Arab world] too much":

It is a common phenomenon among Western students of the Orient to fall in love with a civilization. Such love often ends in bitter impatience when reality fails to conform to the ideal. The rage, in this instance, is that of the Western scholar. His beloved civilization is sick. And what would be more heartwarming to an old Orientalist than to see the greatest Western democracy cure the benighted Muslim? It is either that or something less charitable: if a final showdown between the great religions is indeed the inevitable result of a millennial clash, then we had better make sure that we win.

Hamid Dabashi, writing on 28 May 2018, in an article subtitled "On Bernard Lewis and 'his extraordinary capacity for getting everything wrong'", asked: "Just imagine: What sort of a person would spend a lifetime studying people he loathes? It is quite a bizarre proposition. But there you have it: the late Bernard Lewis did precisely that." Similarly, Richard Bulliet described Lewis as "...a person who does not like the people he is purporting to have expertise about...he doesn't respect them, he considers them to be good and worthy only to the degree they follow a Western path". According to As'ad AbuKhalil, "Lewis has poisoned the Middle East academic field more than any other Orientalist and his influence has been both academic and political. But there is a new generation of Middle East experts in the West who now see clearly the political agenda of Bernard Lewis. It was fully exposed in the Bush years."

=== Alleged nuclear threat from Iran ===
In 2006, Lewis wrote that Iran had been working on a nuclear weapon for fifteen years. In August 2006, in an article about whether the world can rely on the concept of mutual assured destruction as a deterrent in its dealings with Iran, Lewis wrote in The Wall Street Journal about the significance of 22 August 2006 in the Islamic calendar. The Iranian president had indicated he would respond by that date to U.S. demands regarding Iran's development of nuclear power. Lewis wrote that the date corresponded to the 27th day of the month of Rajab of the year 1427, the day Muslims commemorate the night flight of Muhammad from Jerusalem to heaven and back. Lewis wrote that it would be "an appropriate date for the apocalyptic ending of Israel and, if necessary, of the world". According to Lewis, mutual assured destruction is not an effective deterrent in the case of Iran, because of what Lewis describes as the Iranian leadership's "apocalyptic worldview" and the "suicide or martyrdom complex that plagues parts of the Islamic world today". Lewis's article received significant press coverage. However, the day passed without any incident.

== Personal life and death ==
In 1947 he married Ruth Hélène Oppenhejm, with whom he had a daughter and a son. They divorced in 1974. Lewis became a naturalized citizen of the United States in 1982.

Lewis died on 19 May 2018 at age 101, at an assisted-living care facility in Voorhees Township, New Jersey, twelve days before his 102nd birthday. He is buried in Trumpeldor Cemetery in Tel Aviv.

== Bibliography ==
- Lewis, Bernard (1967). The Assassins: A Radical Sect in Islam. London: Weidenfeld & Nicolson.
- Lewis, Bernard (1971). Race and color in Islam. New York: Harper & Row.
- Lewis, Bernard (1984). The Jews of Islam. Princeton: Princeton University Press. ISBN 978-0-691-16087-0.
- Lewis, Bernard (1988). The Political Language of Islam. Chicago: University of Chicago Press.
- Lewis, Bernard (1992). Race and slavery in the Middle East: an historical enquiry. New York: Oxford University Press. ISBN 978-0-19-505326-5.
- Lewis, Bernard (1995). The Middle East: A Brief History of the Last 2,000 Years. New York: Scribner. ISBN 978-0-684-80712-6.
- Lewis, Bernard (1999). The Multiple Identities of the Middle East. Schocken Books. ISBN 978-0-8052-4172-3.
- Lewis, Bernard (2001). The Muslim Discovery of Europe. New York: W.W. Norton & Company. ISBN 978-0-393-32165-4. - Article on book: The Muslim Discovery of Europe
- Lewis, Bernard (2002). What Went Wrong?. New York: Oxford University Press. ISBN 978-0-06-051605-5.
- Lewis, Bernard (2004). From Babel to Dragomans: Interpreting The Middle East. New York: Oxford University Press. ISBN 978-0-19-517336-9.
- Lewis, Bernard; Churchill, Buntzie Ellis (2008). Islam: The Religion and the People. Indianapolis: Wharton Press. ISBN 978-0-13-223085-8.
- Lewis, Bernard; Churchill, Buntzie Ellis (2012). Notes on a century: reflections of a Middle East historian. New York: Viking Penguin. ISBN 978-0-670-02353-0.

== Awards and honors ==
- 1963: Elected as a Fellow of the British Academy
- 1973: Elected to the American Philosophical Society
- 1978: The Harvey Prize, from the Technion – Israel Institute of Technology, for "his profound insight into the life and mores of the peoples of the Middle East through his writings"
- 1983: Elected to the American Academy of Arts and Sciences
- 1990: Selected for the Jefferson Lecture by the National Endowment for the Humanities
- 1996: Finalist for the National Book Critics Circle Award in General Nonfiction, for The Middle East (Scribner)
- 1999: National Jewish Book Award in the Israel category for The Multiple Identities of the Middle East
- 2002: The Thomas Jefferson Medal, awarded by the American Philosophical Society
- 2002: Atatürk International Peace Prize on grounds that he contributed extensively to history scholarship with his accurate analysis of Turkey's and in particular of Atatürk's positive impact on Middle Eastern history.
- 2006: National Humanities Medal, from the National Endowment for the Humanities
- 2007: Irving Kristol Award, from the American Enterprise Institute for Public Policy Research
- 2007: The Scholar-Statesman Award from The Washington Institute for Near East Policy

== See also ==
- Bernard Lewis bibliography
- List of Princeton University people
