= Secondary mania =

- Specialty: Psychiatry

Secondary mania, also known as organic mania, is a variation of bipolar disorder that is caused by physical trauma or illness. Bipolar disorder has a one percent prevalence rate in the United States and secondary mania is likely a small subset of that percentage. Secondary mania exhibits symptoms similar to that of mania in bipolar I and bipolar II disorders. This includes an elevated mood or affect, psychotic state, accelerated speech, increased motor activity, irritability, and flight of ideas. A unique criterion for secondary mania is the lack of history of mental illness that causes mania, such as bipolar disorder. Unlike bipolar disorder, which has an average age of onset at 25 years, secondary mania has an average age of onset at 45 years. Little is known about secondary mania, as much of the research on it is case studies and retrospective accounts. However, it has been connected to several causes such as traumatic brain injury, HIV/AIDS, and stroke.

== Closed-head injury ==
One of the primary documented causes of secondary mania is traumatic brain injury, also called closed-head injury. For example, Jorge and colleagues examined the effects of traumatic brain injury and its correlation with secondary mania. They collected participants that in the previous year had had traumatic brain injuries. They did 3, 6, and 12-month follow-ups with the patients where they took psychiatric interviews to measure impairment of daily life, intellectual, and social function. Within the 9% of patients that met the criteria for secondary mania, a correlation between secondary mania and temporal basal polar lesion was found. On average, the duration of secondary mania was 2 months. A second study found that out of 66 patients with a closed head injury, 9% experienced mania during the 12-month period after their injury.

In a case study a 24-year-old man complained of symptoms of mania. He had no prior mental health issues, no family history for mental health disorders, and no history of substance abuse. After a medical examination, he was diagnosed with mania and psychotic symptoms. Soon after he reported having a severe headache and after examination it was found he had a heterogeneous lesion covering most of his left thalamus. After the lesion was discovered, his diagnosis was revised to be "organic mood disorder (left cerebral AVM, Arteriovenous malformation, with secondary mania)". Another study by Jorge and colleagues looked at the effects of traumatic brain injury and its correlation with secondary mania.

== HIV/AIDS ==
Secondary mania has been associated with HIV/AIDS in a number of cases. According to Ellen and colleagues, secondary mania is reported in 1.2% of HIV-positive patients and 4.3% positive in those with AIDS. In one case study by Chou and colleagues, a 78-year-old man was admitted to the hospital for manic symptoms. "The symptoms included decreased sleep, elevated mood, increased energy, hyperactivity, racing thoughts, and eccentric behavior". The patient had no prior history of mental health problems in his family or his own medical records. He was temporarily diagnosed with bipolar one. It was later discovered that he had HIV/AIDS and his diagnosis was altered to secondary mania.

== Drugs ==
Many drugs have direct or indirect effects on neurotransmitters. Steroids are especially proficient at causing changes to the chemistry of neurotransmitters. In a study, 40 women were given steroids to help with their rheumatoid arthritis. Three subjects developed manic symptoms within the first week of taking the steroid. Two had never had a diagnosis of a mental illness, and one of the three women was noted to be "emotionally labile" and had had a suicide attempt but no hospitalization. It was noted that the mania was not caused by an electrolyte imbalance, but the exact cause was uncertain.

According to Ogawa and Ueki, secondary mania has also been associated with caffeine consumption. A 43-year-old man, with no prior history of mental illness, reportedly switched to drinking 10 cups of coffee a day. After consuming this amount, he was reported to have manic symptoms such as elevated mood, talkativeness, hyperactivity, grandiosity, flight of ideas, and insomnia. This led to his admission into a hospital. After examination, they removed caffeine from the man's diet, resulting in the cessation of manic symptoms. The doctors then concluded that either the caffeine had acted as a catalyst for bipolar disorder or that he had secondary mania. Unfortunately, little research is done on studying the interaction between mood disorders and caffeine.

== Other ==
A case study by Liang and Yang was of a 75-year-old woman who was admitted to the hospital with fever, chills, headache, and vomiting. Upon doing a mental test, they discovered she had symptoms of mania. However, she had no prior history of mental illness. When speaking with the family they discovered that the symptoms had manifested two weeks prior. Eventually, she was diagnosed with enterococcal meningitis for her physical symptoms and secondary mania for her psychological symptoms. The study stated that the exact link between the secondary mania and the enterococcal meningitis is unknown.

Vitamin B12 deficiency is also a known cause of secondary mania. For example, a 2012 case study showed a 16 year old boy who presented with mixed symptoms and psychosis which were present for a year. He was diagnosed with vitamin B12 deficiency and started on risperdone 0.5mg and intramuscular vitamin B12 500mcg. A follow up on the second week revealed that psychosis had ceased. Another case study states that a 35 year old woman was admitted with a 3 week long history of manic symptoms. Valproic acid was used to treat her, but there were no improvements. She was diagnosed with vitamin B12 deficiency and started on intravenous B12 at 1000mcg a day, and after 3 days, she had no symptoms. She was then continued with 1000mcg intramuscular injections and then maintained on one injection a month. After one year, she never had another episode.

== Controversy ==
Since its first discovery over 30 years ago, secondary mania has been difficult to conceptualize. The primary arguments regarding its etiology are: (1) secondary mania is a form of toxic psychosis rather than actual mania, and (2) secondary mania is really latent bipolar disorder that happened to coincide with an injury. Toxic psychosis is a state which is caused by substance abuse; this could mean being in a confused state from the substance. The main argument against this theory is that mania in general has toxic origins and secondary mania is no different in this regard. However, analyses of secondary mania tend to exclude cases in which the person experienced high levels of confusion. Therefore, stating that it is a toxic state does not take away from the validity of its existence as long as the cases of secondary mania are narrowed to those without the confused state. The second argument is harder to dispute, as it is possible that secondary mania is late-onset bipolar disorder. The way this claim is disputed is through looking at the history of the patient. They check to see if there is a negative pre-morbid history, a lack of history of mental illness, age of onset, and the close proximity of the organic trauma to the mania.
