= The Political Language of Islam =

Book by Bernard Lewis

- Title page for The Political Language of Islam (1988)
- Author: Bernard Lewis
- Language: English
- Genre: Non-fiction
- Publication date: 1988

The Political Language of Islam (1988) by Bernard Lewis is a work in the contemporary, scholarly understanding of the relationship between Islam and politics and in the contemporary, scholarly understanding of the political realities of predominantly Muslim countries and, to a lesser extent, of countries with large Muslim communities.

Classic Islamic thought recognized no separation between church and state. According to Lewis, the idea of the secular only began to enter the political thought of Muslim countries and communities in the 19th century.
