= The Jews of Islam =

Book by Bernard Lewis

The Jews of Islam (1984) is a book written by Middle-East historian and scholar Bernard Lewis. The book provides a comprehensive overview of the history and the state of the Jews living in the Islamic world (as contrasted to the Jews of Christendom). The first chapter, "Islam and Other Religions", is broader in scope and explains how medieval Islamic society viewed the Other.

== Contents ==
- Chapter I. Islam and Other religions
- Chapter II. The Judaeo-Islamic Tradition
- Chapter III. The Late Medieval and Early Modern Periods
- Chapter IV. The End of the Tradition

== Reviews ==
- Stillman, Norman A. (October 1984). "Peaceful Coexistence". The New York Review of Books. 31 (16).
- Schroeter, Daniel J. (November 1989). "The Jews of Islam, Review". International Journal of Middle East Studies. 21 (4).
- Patai, Raphael (June 1985). "Untitled review". The American Historical Review. 90 (3). doi:10.1086/ahr/90.3.743.

== See also ==
- Dhimmi
- Jizya
