= Islam and the West =

1993 book by Bernard Lewis

- Author: Bernard Lewis
- Language: English
- Subject: Western civilization and Islamic world
- Genre: Islamic history
- Publisher: Oxford University Press
- Publication date: June 25, 1993
- Publication place: United States
- Media type: Print (Hardcover, Paperback), E-book
- Pages: 240
- ISBN: 978-0195090611
- OCLC: 861763859

Islam and the West is a 1993 book written by Middle-East historian and scholar Bernard Lewis.

The book deals with the relations between Islam and Western civilization. It is divided into 3 sections. The first section treats the history of the interactions between Europe and the Islamic world. The second section is concerned with the perceptions arising from these interactions by both societies. The third and final section is concerned with Islamic responses and reactions in earlier and recent times.

== Quote from the author ==
Historians in free countries have a moral and professional obligation not to shirk the difficult issues and subjects that some people would place under a sort of taboo; not to submit to voluntary censorship, but to deal with these matters fairly, honestly, without apologetics, without polemic, and, of course, competently. Those who enjoy freedom have a moral obligation to use that freedom for those who do not possess it. We live in a time when great efforts have been made, and continue to be made, to falsify the record of the past and to make history a tool of propaganda; when governments, religious movements, political parties, and sectional groups of every kind are busy rewriting history as they would wish it to have been, as they would like their followers to believe that it was. All this is very dangerous indeed, to ourselves and to others, however we may define otherness -- dangerous to our common humanity. Because, make no mistake, those who are unwilling to confront the past will be unable to understand the present and unfit to face the future.

== Contents ==
- Encounters
- 1 Europe and Islam
- 2 Legal and Historical Reflections on the Position of Muslim Populations Under Non-Muslim Rule : Studies and Perceptions
- 3 Translation from Arabic
- 4 The Ottoman Obsession
- 5 Gibbon on Muhammad
- 6 The Question of Orientalism
- 7 Other People's History : Islamic Response and Reaction
- 8 The Return of Islam
- 9 The Shia in Islamic History
- 10 Counts and Freedom
- 11 Religious Coexistence and Secularism
- Summary
- Critique
- Bibliography

== The Question of Orientalism ==
=== Summary ===
The sixth chapter of the book explores the meaning of Orientalism. It is argued that the word orientalism was until relatively recently used mainly in two senses, to denote either a branch of scholarship or a school of painting. However, Lewis contends that it has now been given a new meaning, "that of unsympathetic or hostile treatment of oriental peoples." (p100).

The historical beginnings of oriental scholarship in Western Europe are dated to the time of the Renaissance. Its history is then traced from relatively narrow roots where one discipline, philology, recovered, studied, published and interpreted texts relating to one region—that which is now called the Middle East—to its gradual expansion to include other disciplines such as philosophy, theology, literature and history and a diversity of areas from the Ottoman Empire to India and China.

Having reached a point where the multi-disciplinary approaches and the sheer number of regions under study rendered the term "Orientalist" obsolete, Lewis argues it was, in effect, formally abandoned by those he terms accredited orientalists at the 29th International Congress of Orientalists in 1973. Lewis laments that although the term has now been revived its usage has changed to that of a term of polemic abuse.

An exploration of the rise of anti-orientalism follows where critics from a diversity of sources ranging from Islamicists to Arab Nationalists to Marxist theorists are briefly considered before Lewis concludes by identifying its main exponent in the United States, Edward Said.

A significant proportion of the remainder of the chapter is devoted to a critique of Said's book Orientalism published in 1978. Lewis attributes the success of Said's book to its anti-Western stance, its use of, "the ideas, and still more the language of currently fashionable literary, philosophical and political theories." (p114) and its apparent simplification of complex problems.

Finally the chapter concludes with a brief review of the counter-critique from Arab writers such as the Egyptian philosopher Fu'ad Zakana.
