= Richard W. Bulliet =

American historian (born 1940)

- Born: October 30, 1940 (age 85); Rockford, Illinois
- Occupations: Author, university professor

Richard W. Bulliet (born 1940) is a professor emeritus of Middle Eastern history at Columbia University who specializes in the history of Islamic society and institutions, the history of technology, and the history of the role of animals in human society.

== Early life and education ==
Bulliet grew up in Illinois. He attended Harvard from which he graduated with a BA as a member of Phi Beta Kappa in 1962. He later earned both an MA in 1964 and a PhD in 1967 from Harvard as well.

== Work ==
Several of his books focus on Iran but also deal with the larger Muslim world.

His book The Camel and the Wheel (1975) brings together his interest in the histories of technology, animal domestication, and the Middle East, dealing for example with the significant military advantage early Muslim armies gained from a slight improvement in the design of cloth camel saddles.

He would return to the history of animal domestication with his Hunters, Herders, and Hamburgers: The Past and Future of Human-Animal Relationships (2005). In it, he presents the four stages of human-animal relationship history: separation (when humans began to consider themselves as fundamentally separate from animals), pre-domestication (rich in symbolic expression of animals), domestication (exploiting and taming animals for human use), and post-domestication (our current industrialized consumption and separation from domestic animals).

He has also written several novels which draw on his knowledge of international politics and the Middle East, and is a promoter of the validity of comics as an art form.

Bulliet's commentaries and opinion pieces on the Middle East have appeared in The Guardian, New York Times International Edition, and Süddeutsche Zeitung.

It was through the connections of Bulliet to the Iranian U.N. Ambassador that Columbia President Lee C. Bollinger invited Iranian President Mahmoud Ahmadinejad to speak at Columbia University on September 24, 2007.

== Personal life ==
He is the grandson of Clarence Joseph ("C.J.") Bulliet, an art critic and journalist.

== Books ==
=== Non-fiction ===
- The Patricians of Nishapur: a Study in Medieval Islamic History (1972)
- The Camel and the Wheel (1975)
- Conversion to Islam in the Medieval Period: An Essay in Quantitative History (1979)
- Islam: the View from the Edge (1994)
- Under Siege: Islam and Democracy (1994)
- The Encyclopedia of the Modern Middle East (co-editor, 1996)
- The Earth and Its Peoples: A Global History (co-author, 1997)
- The Columbia History of the Twentieth Century (editor, 1998)
- The Case for Islamo-Christian Civilization (2004)
- Hunters, Herders, and Hamburgers: The Past and Future of Human-Animal Relationships (2005)

=== Fiction ===
- Kicked to Death by a Camel (1973), nominated for an Edgar Award for "Best First Mystery"
- Tomb of the Twelfth Imam (1979)
- The Gulf Scenario (1984)
- The Sufi Fiddle (1991)
- The One-Donkey Solution (2011)
