= As'ad AbuKhalil =

Lebanese-American political scientist (born 1960)

- أسعد أبو خليل
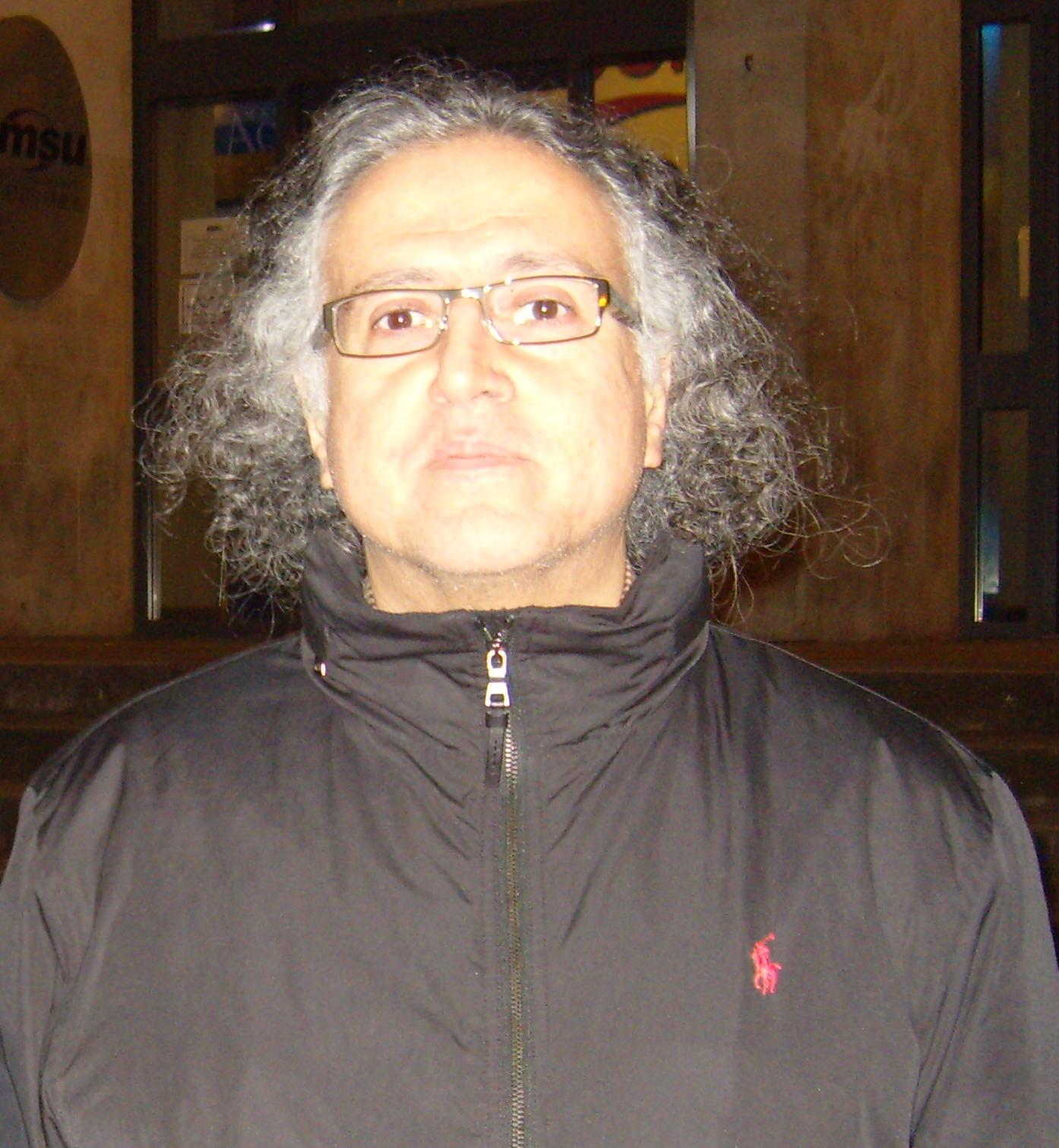
- Born: 16 March 1960 (age 66); Tyre, Lebanon
- Other name: The Angry Arab
- Education: Georgetown University (PhD); American University of Beirut (BA, MA)
- Occupations: Professor; writer; blogger
- Years active: 1990s–present
- Website: angryarab.blogspot.com

As'ad AbuKhalil (Arabic: أسعد أبو خليل; born 16 March 1960) is a Lebanese-American professor of political science at California State University, Stanislaus. AbuKhalil is the author of Historical Dictionary of Lebanon (1998), Bin Laden, Islam & America's New "War on Terrorism" (2002), and The Battle for Saudi Arabia (2004).

== Biography ==
AbuKhalil's father served as secretary-general of the Parliament of Lebanon. He studied for a BA and MA in political science at the American University of Beirut, and a PhD in comparative politics at Georgetown University. AbuKhalil is a professor at California State University, Stanislaus, and was briefly a visiting professor at University of California, Berkeley.

== Political views ==
AbuKhalil describes himself as "a former Marxist-Leninist, now an anarchist".

He is an opponent of the Iraq War. He is sharply critical of United States foreign policy, and denounces the corruption of Fatah and the "vulgar anti-Jewish references” made by Hamas, but sees "Israel and state-sponsored terrorism" as a far greater problem in scale and magnitude. He also criticises Iran, Saudi Arabia, and all rival factions in Lebanon including the Shia Islam Hezbollah.

=== Israel/Palestine ===
He opposes the state of Israel, stating that "Justice and freedom for the Palestinians are incompatible with the existence of the state of Israel". Some opponents to BDS, among them Prime Minister of Israel Benjamin Netanyahu, have cited a part from AbuKhalil's article published in Al Akhbar where he wrote: "Finkelstein rightly asks whether the real aim of BDS is to bring down the state of Israel. Here, I agree with him that it is. That should be stated as an unambiguous goal. There should not be any equivocation on the subject" in their campaigns against the movement. In response, Abu Khalil wrote on his personal blog that it represented his personal position of what the goals of BDS should be, and that it was being purposefully distorted to stigmatize the movement.

He criticizes the influence of the Israel lobby in the United States. In a televised debate which aired on Al Jazeera on February 23, 2010 (as translated by MEMRI), AbuKhalil stated that US President Barack Obama "has given free rein to the Zionist lobby to do whatever it likes, both in terms of foreign policy and domestic policy." AbuKhalil also stated that "The Zionists want to muzzle us, so that we won't oppose the wars, violence, or hatred of Israel." In the same interview, Abukhalil sharply criticized MEMRI, stating that it is "a rude, propaganda-spreading organization ... which was established by a former Israeli intelligence official" (alluding to MEMRI founder, Yigal Carmon).

In 2020, AbuKhalil was criticized for posting a prediction on Twitter that Israel would put non-Jewish patients infected with COVID-19 in "mass prisons".

=== Lebanon ===
In an interview on New TV on January 13, 2010, AbuKhalil stated that "Lebanese nationalism – just like Zionism – was founded on racism and contempt for others – whether for Lebanese of other sects or for other Arabs. ... The Lebanese people, with all its sects, has never proven that it wants, or is capable of, true coexistence. Coexistence in Lebanon is coexistence in blood, conflict, and civil strife."

=== News media ===
In an interview which aired on Al Jazeera on October 25, 2011 (as translated by MEMRI), AbuKhalil accused the network of bias and accuses it of giving preferential treatment of "American Propaganda Officials."

== The Angry Arab News Service ==
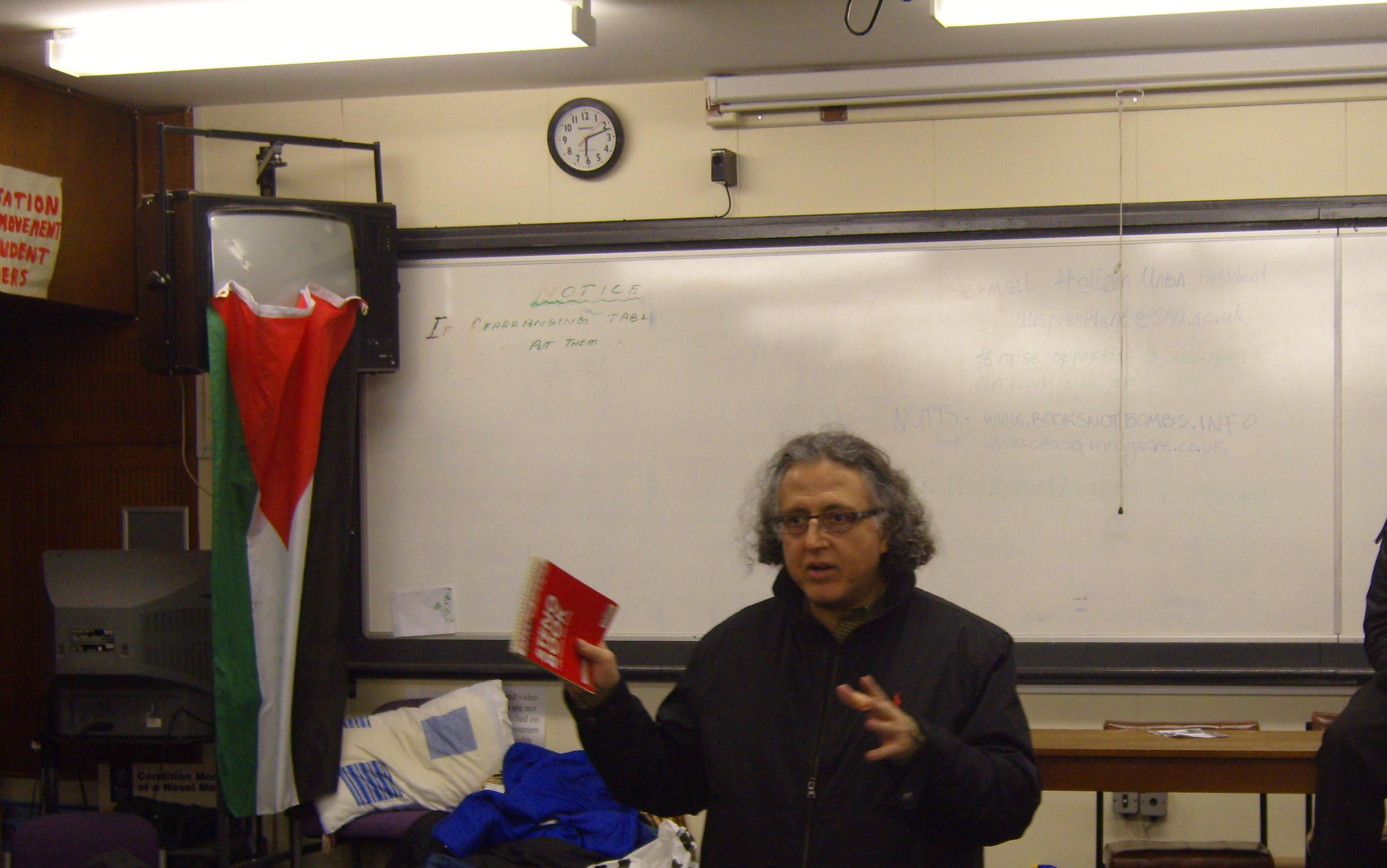
As'ad AbuKhalil addressing students in the University of Manchester

AbuKhalil's blog, the Angry Arab News Service, was launched in September 2003. The name of the blog is taken from a phrase used by a TV producer to describe AbuKhalil's perspective.

According to the Los Angeles Times, the blog is "known for its sarcastic but knowledgeable commentary", and "stands out for its sense of humor in the dour left-wing landscape." Ken Silverstein writes that the blog often becomes "a furious stream of consciousness that lacks paragraph breaks or other typographic niceties" (though AbuKhalil is nevertheless "a terrific writer and an insightful political analyst").

Commenting on his own coverage of the Syrian civil war, journalist Glenn Greenwald said "I've often cited As'ad AbuKhalil as a great source on all matters Middle East and – without adopting all or even most of what he has said – he covers Syria almost every day and does it very well."

== Books ==
- Historical Dictionary of Lebanon (1998), ISBN 978-0-8108-3395-1
- Bin Laden, Islam & America's New "War on Terrorism" (2002), ISBN 978-1-58322-492-2
- The Battle For Saudi Arabia: Royalty, Fundamentalism, and Global Power (2004), ISBN 978-1-58322-610-0

== Articles ==
- The (Unrecognized) US Contribution to Bloodshed in Syria, by As'ad AbuKhalil, April 29, 2018, consortiumnews.com
- The (Unrecognized) US Contribution to Bloodshed in Syria, Part Two, by As'ad AbuKhalil, May 15, 2018, consortiumnews.com
