= Amina Aqdas =

Iranian royal consort (d. 1893)

Amina Aqdas امینه اقدس
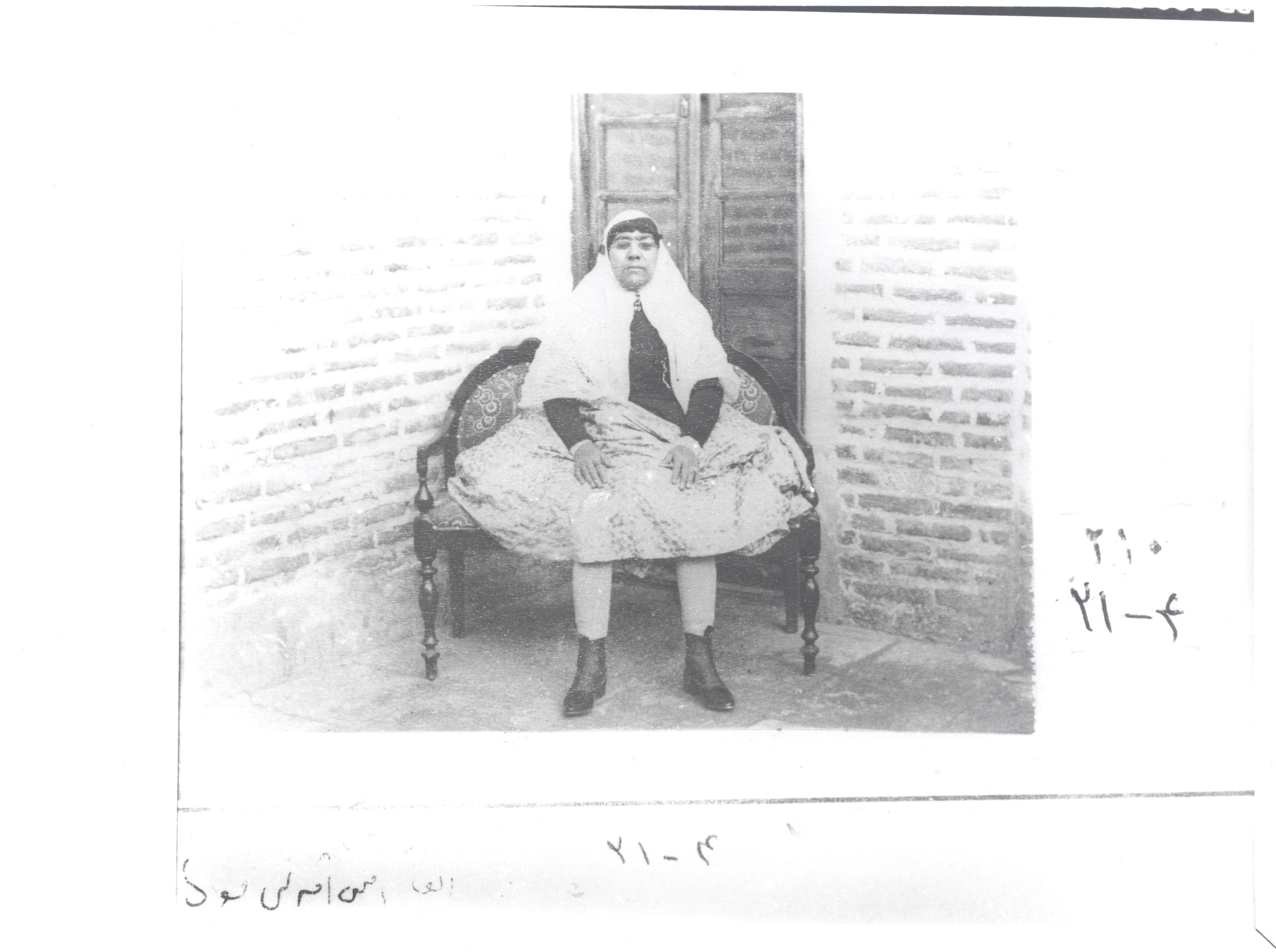

Consort of the Qajar Shah
- Born: Bijar, Qajar Iran
- Died: 2 July 1894; Tehran, Qajar Iran
- Burial: Shah Abdol-Azim Shrine
- Spouse: Naser al-Din Shah Qajar
- House: Qajar

Amina Aqdas (Persian: امینه اقدس; died 2 July 1894) was a royal consort of Naser al-Din Shah Qajar of Iran (r. 1848–1896). Amina Aqdas was one of Naser al-Din Shah’s beloved and influential wives, who occasionally played an important role.

== Life ==
She was the daughter of an impoverished shepherd from a village near Garrūs in Kurdistan, and was employed as a free maidservant to the shah's wife Anīs al-Dawla in the Qajar harem in 1859. In the manner of the Qajar harem custom, she entered in a relationship with the Shah via a temporary marriage and was classified as a concubine.

She eventually became a favorite of the shah, second only to Anīs-al-dawla. Contemporaries attributed her influence to an ability to manipulate the shah's weak spots: she catered to his whims, encouraged his obsessions, and appealed to his parsimony. Her power was also enhanced by the shah's intense attachment to her nephew, Gholam-Ali, Malijak-e Thani, also known as Aziz al-Soltan. She supported the career of Mirza Ali Asghar Khan Amin al-Soltan. She was entrusted with several important responsibilities, such as supervising the shah's private apartment, where the crown jewels were kept; keeping the shah's most important seal, and put in charge of all presents given to the shah.

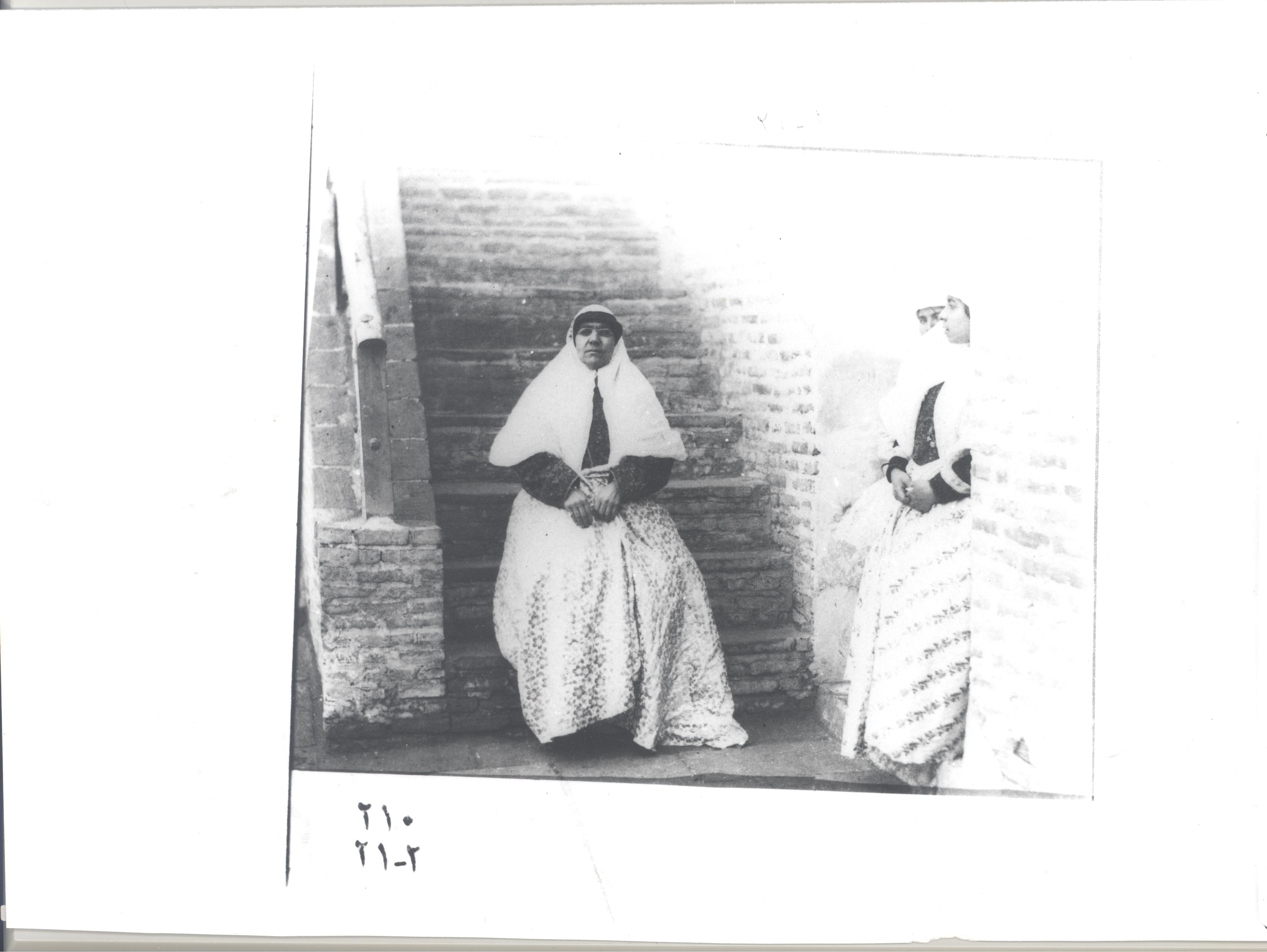
Photograph of Amina Aqdas

Taking care of the Shah’s favorite cats, such as Babri Khan and others, was among Zobeideh’s duties. Naser al-Din Shah mentioned this in his travel journal to the holy cities in 1287 AH: “Today I told Zobeideh to put Babri Khan in the carriage and bring him” or “Babri Khan was there in Zobeideh’s tent and walked a little in the desert.” Upon the Shah’s return from the pilgrimage to the holy cities, Zafran Baji passed away, and Zobeideh took her place, receiving the title Amina Aqdas. She was entrusted with the management of the harem’s treasury and the Shah’s jewels, and at the end of each year, she would deliver the coins and cash to the central treasury.

In 1890, she became the first royal consort to visit the West, when she travelled to Europe to receive treatment for her eye condition, a journey which was widely criticised by the ulama. After her return from Europe, she was paralyzed due to a stroke.

== Political power ==
The relationship between Amina Aqdas and Mirza Ibrahim Khan Amin al-Soltan led to a growing number of critics and opponents, who regarded her as an executor of Amin al-Soltan’s political designs. According to Eʿtemad al-Saltaneh, He wrote: “What Ibrahim Khan displayed outwardly, she carried out behind the scenes.”He also referred to their relationship with astonishment, stating: “On the morning of 26 Rajab 1300 AH, when I went to Eshratabad, the Shah told me that he had appointed Amina Aqdas to visit Amin al-Soltan and nurse him daily. Glory be to God! I do not believe that at any time it has occurred that the independent sovereign of Iran would send his own consort to nurse a servant. Such was my astonishment that after lunch I did not remain in the Shah’s presence.” After the death of Mirza Ibrahim Khan Amin al-Soltan, his son, Ali Asghar Khan, maintained and further strengthened his friendly relations with Amina Aqdas.

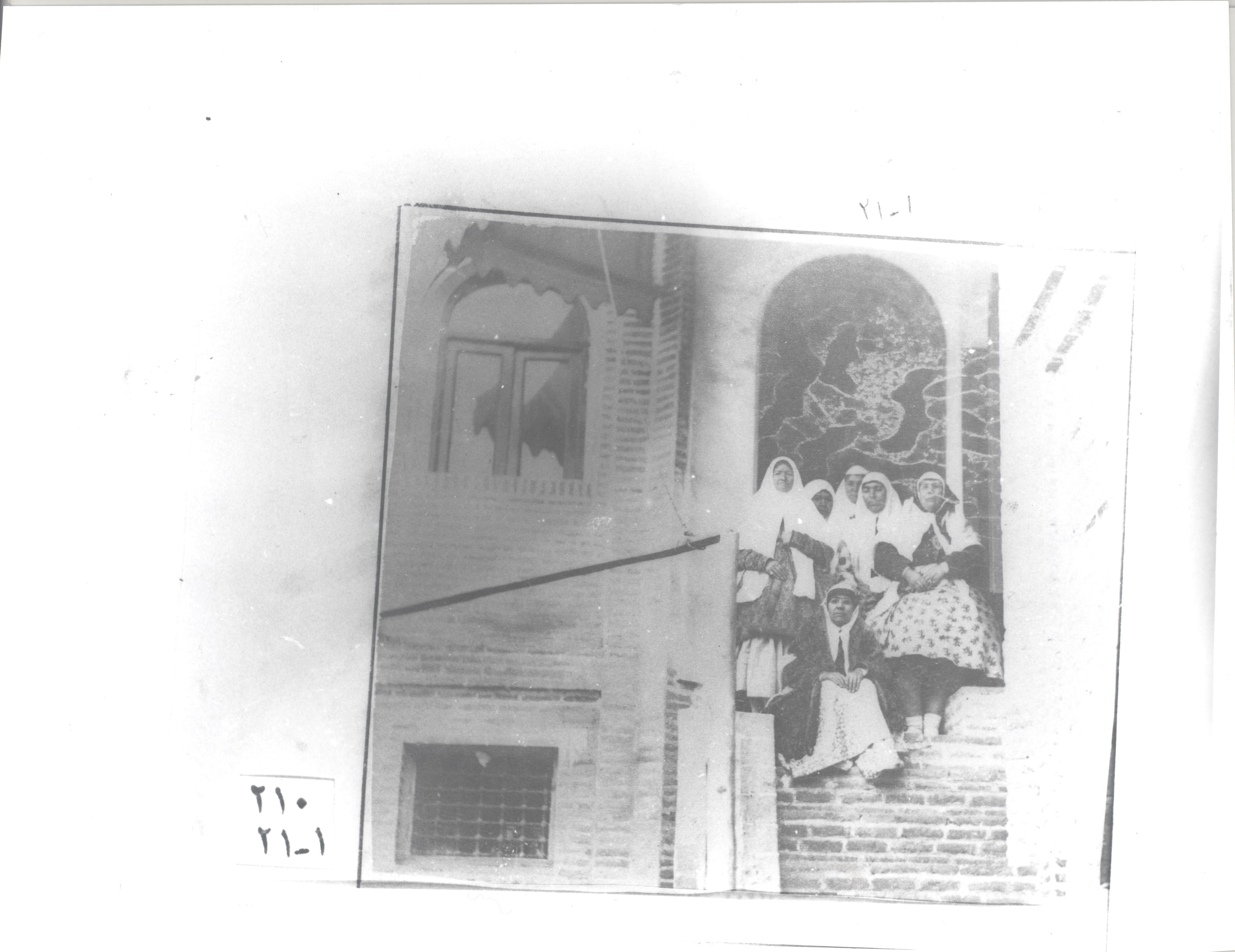
Amina Aqdas sitting on the stairs

Amina Aqdas did not enjoy full popularity among the Shah’s consorts and faced numerous rivals. Her most significant competitor was Anis al-Dawlah, who had a longer tenure in the harem and was herself one of the Shah’s favored wives. In his daily reports, Eʿtemad al-Saltaneh referred to these rivalries, writing:“Tonight, due to yesterday’s dispute with the harem members, they dined outside the house. The details of this disagreement are as follows: yesterday, the usual route from Kashidar to Kalpush was six farsakhs long, crowded, and difficult, whereas the route taken by the Shah was three farsakhs and pleasant. Anis al-Dawlah, the princes, and other harem members had taken the usual route, but the Shah ordered Amina Aqdas to immediately follow him. This privilege caused resentment among the other harem members, who even displayed audacity and disrespect in the Shah’s presence.”The rivalry between these two royal consorts extended beyond travel routes and journeys; it also encompassed matters of health and the construction of charitable endowments. For instance, after Anis al-Dawlah decided in 1284 AH to build a gate between the Goharshad Mosque and Dar al-Sa‘adah, Amina Aqdas, in 1309 AH, constructed a silver gate between Dar al-Sa‘adah and the corridor leading to the Saqakhaneh.

Sit-ins at the residences of the Shah’s favored consorts were a means for officials to advance their requests, and the choice of residence often reflected the political strategy of each consort. Mohammad Hasan Khan E'temad os-Saltaneh usually selected the residence of Anis al-Dawlah for such sit-ins, but when necessary, he also sought the assistance of Amina Aqdas and her powerful attendants. For example, in order to obtain the title of E'temad os-Saltaneh, he chose intermediaries such as Amina Aqdas and Bahram Khan Khwaja. Gholam Reza Khan Shahab al-Molk, who had lost his position as Sardar of the Royal Gates, also held a sit-in at Amin Aqdas’s residence and succeeded in reclaiming his post from Kamran Mirza Nayeb es-Saltaneh.

In addition to sit-ins, petitions delivered to the Shah through Amina Aqdas were often accepted, and she frequently interceded on behalf of Mirza Reza Kermani. The first attempt to secure his reemployment was made in 1304 AH by Mohammad Hasan Khan Amin al-Zarb. Mirza Reza Kermani, who had previously served under Mohammad Hasan Khan Amin al-Zarb, left his position due to a dispute. His sister-in-law, Mirza Khanum, was Amina Aqdas’s secretary and, through this connection, requested Mirza Reza’s return to service. Amin Aqdas wrote to Amin al-Zarb:“Āqā Mirza Mohammad Reza Kermani, who formerly served in your administration, has served for some time without any signs of misconduct. He appears to be a capable individual. Why should he be dismissed from your service? Of course, monitor him closely and assign important tasks to him. Whenever obstacles arise, I will do my utmost to ensure that his work is not delayed and proceeds according to your wishes.” The second instance occurred in 1307 AH, when Sayyid Jamal al-Din Asadabadi returned to Iran and stayed at Amin al-Zarb’s residence. Mirza Reza served him, but Sayyid Jamal’s arrest and expulsion from Iran deeply upset Mirza Reza, who protested against it. Mokhtar Khan, the governor of Hazrat Abd al-Azim, arrested Mirza Reza and subjected him to the wheel and whipping. He was released after paying 14 tomans, but a letter from Amin Aqdas to Mokhtar Khan secured the return of his money.

Shortly afterward, in 1308 AH, Mirza Reza Kermani was once again arrested on the orders of Kamran Mirza, the Naib al-Saltaneh. Mohammad Khan Amin Khaghan, Amin Aqdas’s brother, visited him in prison and said:There is no danger for you. Mirza Khanum is in Amin Aqdas’s service, and I will also return so that, through Amin Aqdas’s intercession, we can secure your release.”

At times, Amina Aqdas’s intercessions proved ineffective, and Naser al-Din Shah did not act on her recommendations. One such case involved Haj Sayyah, whose family sought Amina Aqdas’s help to secure his release from prison, but her efforts were in vain. Haj Sayyah’s son was sent to deliver a petition to Amina Aqdas, and she instructed him: “The Shah will come here; do not be afraid. He is a human being like you and me, and he is kind. When he arrives, fall at his feet and say: ‘I seek my father,’ and then present the petition.” Similarly, in 1302 AH, Hossein Qoli Khan Sa‘d al-Molk (Nezam al-Saltaneh Mafi) sought Amin Aqdas’s assistance to prevent the governance of Khamseh from being assigned to him. However, her pleas and intercessions with the Shah yielded no results.

During her lifetime, Amina Aqdas was awarded the “Compassion” medal by Sultan Abdul Hamid II of the Ottoman Empire and also received the diamond-studded Mokalal medal from Naser al-Din Shah.

== Travel to Europe for medical treatment ==
Amina Aqdas, lost sight in one eye in 1302 AH and received treatment for it. It was rumored that Mirza Ali Akbar Khan Motamed al-Atibba had caused her blindness by “pouring Belladonna juice” into her eye. In the diary of Etemad al-Saltaneh, regarding Amina Aqdas’s first complaint about her vision, it is written: “12 Rabi’ al-Thani 1302 – Amina Aqdas said her eye was defective; His Majesty was somewhat distressed. Anis al-Dowleh, who had been upset and did not attend this journey, was displeased because the carriage had been given to Amina Aqdas.”

For her treatment, all foreign and Iranian court physicians became involved. The foreign and Iranian doctors who treated Amina Aqdas’s eyes included Dr. Dixon, Dr. Telouzan, Mirza Seyed Razi (chief physician), Hakim al-Mamalek, Mirza Abolghasem Naeini, Mirza Mohammad Hossein Khahal Iraqi, Haji Arab Khahal, and Dr. Fourrier.Her eye treatment became a political issue and an opportunity to gain favor with the Shah and personal advantages. Shortly after news of her blindness spread, it was rumored that “Amina Aqdas’s eye is improving…” Etemad al-Saltaneh wrote upon reporting this: “…it is said that the British embassy gave two or three thousand tomans to Khwaja Amina Aqdas and herself so that she would inform the Shah that Dixon had treated her eye, as Dixon in this matter, where we need both Russia and England, would have access to the harem and gain influence”Her eye treatment became a political issue and an opportunity to gain favor with the Shah and personal advantages. Shortly after news of her blindness spread, it was rumored that “Amina Aqdas’s eye is improving…” Etemad al-Saltaneh wrote upon reporting this: “…it is said that the British embassy gave two or three thousand tomans to Khwaja Amina Aqdas and herself so that she would inform the Shah that Dixon had treated her eye, as Dixon in this matter, where we need both Russia and England, would have access to the harem and gain influence…”

Amina Aqdas’s blindness worried her about losing her influence and popularity with Naser al-Din Shah, so she wanted all the doctors to examine her in hopes that one might work a miracle. Sometimes she even dreamt of summoning a specific doctor: “The Prophet (peace be upon him) had told her to bring a doctor among my descendants in Tehran for her treatment. Therefore, Mirza Seyed Razi, chief physician, was brought.” When a treatment failed, she would complain about the physician or even consider punishing them, though the Shah prevented these actions. All doctors treated her under the assumption that her sight could be restored, and rumors occasionally claimed her vision had returned. Opponents of Amina Aqdas were pleased with her blindness, believing it would reduce her influence and favor with the Shah. However, Amina Aqdas, aware of this, took young favorite wives of the Shah, such as the gardener’s daughter known as Khanum Bashi, under her wing and trained them. In reality, her blindness did not diminish her favor with the Shah, and “the Shah was restless, anxious, and sleepless.

When Naser al-Din Shah planned his third trip to Europe, Anis al-Dowleh and Amina Aqdas were eager to accompany him, especially since Amina Aqdas hoped to restore her sight there. The Shah’s wives were only able to accompany him partway, not the full journey. Amina Aqdas had an advantage over Anis al-Dowleh because Aziz al-Sultan Malijak accompanied the Shah. Upon the Shah’s return, Amina Aqdas was the first to be acknowledged over Anis al-Dowleh, and the Shah asked her to go to Qazvin to greet Aziz al-Sultan, who missed him.

Her eye problems worsened in 1307 AH after the Shah’s return from Europe: “…we went to Amina Aqdas’s room; she was moaning from eye pain and her eye hurt. She made our time bitter.” Her second eye also became affected. Yet Amina Aqdas, now more anxious than ever, “hid her pain from the Shah and even from the doctor.”

Naser al-Din Shah assigned Dr. Fourrier to examine and treat her eyes, with Etemad al-Saltaneh accompanying as translator. However, “the Iranian doctors did not want me to go; they told Bahram Khan that so-and-so would inform the Shah about the lady’s blindness.” Each time a new doctor arrived, Amina Aqdas would claim her sight had returned, though in reality she could see nothing. The treating doctor reported: “The pain has stopped, but the disease progresses daily because no one undertakes the operation that alone could prevent it.” The Shah worried and sought a solution.

Eventually, after the blindness of both eyes was confirmed, a council of all her treating physicians, headed by Mirza Ali Asghar Khan Amin al-Saltanah, was formed, and it was decided to send her to Europe for treatment. The doctors knew the trip would likely be futile, but Amina Aqdas hoped foreign doctors could restore her vision, and Amin al-Saltan supported her. Dr. Fourrier wrote about her treatment and journey:“Amina Aqdas has become almost completely blind. I wanted to operate on her two months ago and prevent it from reaching this stage, but I was not allowed. The Shah, unwilling to act against his beloved, left her entirely free, and court conspirators caused doubt that delayed the operation, worsening her condition day by day. Initially, they terrified her completely, and then, seeing her resolve to follow my orders for surgery, they said she must be treated abroad so the honor of her treatment would not go to me, protecting her status and influence… Agha Bahram, eager to see Europe in service of his lady, intensified her desire to travel.”

Vienna was the destination, and the renowned Dr. Forks was her physician. Although many volunteered to accompany her, critics were numerous. This was the first time a Shah’s wife traveled to Europe, drawing criticism for costs and the unprecedented journey of a harem lady. Amin al-Dowleh suggested she go to the Ottoman Empire instead “the city of Islam, where Iranian women traveling is not unusual,” with the doctor meeting her there but the Shah rejected this and sent her to Vienna. He wrote in his diary: “Amina Aqdas’s trip to Europe distracted and exhausted us…”

The blind wife of the Shah departed on 10 Sha’ban 1307 AH. Before traveling, she handed over all the treasury and jewels she held to the central treasury. Naser al-Din Shah recorded his deep sorrow at parting from her. Among the common people, poems were recited criticizing the Shah for this action.

After Amina Aqdas arrived in Vienna, her surgery was performed, and daily reports on her treatment were sent to the Shah: “…a telegraph from Nariman Khan from Vienna stated that Amina Aqdas saw the light of the lamp, and this telegraph was presented to His Majesty by Amin al-Saltan through Aziz Khan. The Shah was awakened from sleep, given the telegram, and this partial good news was conveyed. That very night, music was played and celebrations were held.”

However, all these reports were false. After spending enormous sums, Amina Aqdas returned to Tehran in Dhu al-Qi’dah 1307 AH completely blind. The only result of this journey was despair and sorrow. She immediately traveled to Khorasan, seeking healing from Imam Reza, and the Shah ordered a grand entourage for this trip, as a demonstration of Amina Aqdas’s authority and prestige.

After several months in Khorasan, Amina Aqdas returned to Tehran amid rumors of her eyes improving and the flattering reception by officials. Yet she had still found no cure, and in Dhu al-Hijjah 1308 AH, she suffered a stroke, becoming “completely paralyzed on one side in addition to being blind.” However, none of this prevented her active presence at court or diminished her influence.

In 1309 AH, the Tobacco Concession incident occurred. Following the fatwa of prohibition issued by Ayatollah Mirza Hasan Shirazi, all women of the harem ceased their opposition in compliance “except for the Shah, Amin al-Saltan, and Amina Aqdas.” Her staunch opponent, Mohammad Hasan Khan Etemad al-Saltaneh, believed that Amina Aqdas played a role in the Shah’s predicament during the Tobacco Concession and wrote critically: “The directive of the young man like Amin al-Saltan and his counterpart like Amina Aqdas brings about the final outcome, and may God preserve the end…”

== Death ==
On 27 Dhu al-Hijjah 1311 AH, Zubaydeh Khanum Amina Aqdas, who still hoped for the recovery of her eyesight, suffered a stroke and passed away the following day. Eʿtemad al-Saltaneh described her death and the bathing ceremony, noting that the Grand Vizier was summoned to assist in the arrangements. According to his account, the woman who until a few hours earlier had considered herself the powerful queen of Iran lay lifeless on an old mattress, and several attendants carried her body out of the inner quarters. Near the residence of Aziz al-Sultan, they paused, and Mulla Mohammad Ali was called to perform the funeral prayer. Amin Aqdas’s body was then transferred for burial at the shrine of Hazrat Shah Abd al-Azim.

The day after her death, her jewels were seized by the royal treasury. Her salaries were allocated to the staff of the coffeehouse, and her properties, both in Tehran and in Gerus, were transferred to Aziz al-Soltan. Among her estates were Nazabad in southwestern Tehran, Aliabad, and two timches (small covered bazaars) in Tehran’s main market.

The Austrian ambassador in Tehran also reported to his foreign ministry that Amin Aqdas was highly favored and respected by Naser al-Din Shah the same woman whose eyes had been operated on years earlier by surgeons in Vienna. Although she was not one of the Shah’s legal wives, she enjoyed his complete trust and held a very high position within the harem and in his private life. For this reason, her death had a profound impact on the Shah, to the extent that he changed his residence to cope with his grief.

Mirza Ali Khan Amin al-Dowleh, who harbored deep animosity toward Amina Aqdas and referred to her as the “Mother of Satan” He also acknowledged that, unlike his usual practice of distracting himself with activities during the mourning of loved ones, Naser al-Din Shah was deeply grieved by Amina Aqdas’s death.
