= Jeyran (wife of Naser al-Din Shah) =

Mistress and wife of Naser al-Din Shah Qajar (1835–1860)

Jeyran جیران
- Forough ol-Saltaneh فروغ‌السلطنه
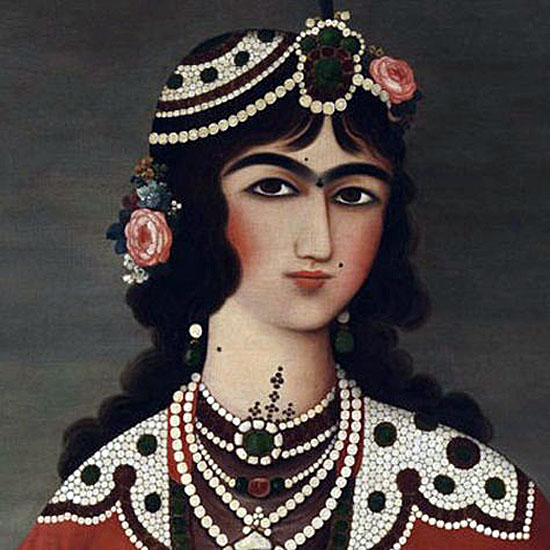
- Potential portrait of Jeyran according to some sources

Permanent consort (aghdi) of the Qajar shah
- Tenure: 1857–1860
- Born: Khadija Khanom Tajrishi c. 1835; Tajrish, Iran
- Died: 2 January 1860 (aged 24–25); Tehran, Iran
- Burial: Shah Abdol-Azim Shrine, Ray
- Spouse: Naser al-Din Shah (m. 1857)
- Issue: Muhammad Mirza; Qasim Mirza; Roknaddin Mirza; Khorshid Kolah Khanum
- Dynasty: Qajar
- Father: Mohammad Ali Khan Tajrishi

Khadijah Khanoum Tajrishi (Persian: خدیجه خانم تجریشی), titled Forough ol-Saltaneh (Persian: فروغ‌السلطنه), and more widely known as Jeyran (Persian: جیران; born, c. 1835 – 2 January 1860) was one of the beloved wives and first mistress of Naser al-Din Shah Qajar (r. 1848–1896).

Known for her beauty and charm, Jeyran was born as Khadijah, daughter of Mohammad Ali, a gardener and carpenter. She met Naser al-Din Shah around 1852 and became his concubine at the age of 17 while he was 4 years older. She got given title of Forough os-Saltaneh, meaning "the light of the reign" about 5–6 years later when she officially married the Shah and became his permanent wife (having already four children at that time, one of them dead).

Jeyran spread her influence by the birth of her second child, Mohammad Qasem Mirza, who was made commander-in-chief. Although he had no maternal Qajar ancestor, with a fake lineage made for Jeyran which linked her to the Sasanians and Ilkhanate, he became the crown prince, but shortly after, he died. Afterwards, Jeyran lost all of her children and contracted tuberculosis. She died in January 1860 at the age of 24. Her death had an impact on Naser al-Din Shah, who abandoned his royal responsibilities for a while.

== Early life ==
Jeyran was born in 1835 in Tajrish village near Tehran. Named "Khadijah", she was the daughter of Mohammad Ali Khan Tajrishi, a gardener and carpenter. As well as a sister, Jeyran had an older brother named Asadollah, who after a while of her presence in the court became a servant, chamberlain and an advisor to the shah. Also their father, Mohammad Ali, did get appointed as the ruler of Tajrish and its nearby regions.

== Meeting Naser al-Din Shah ==
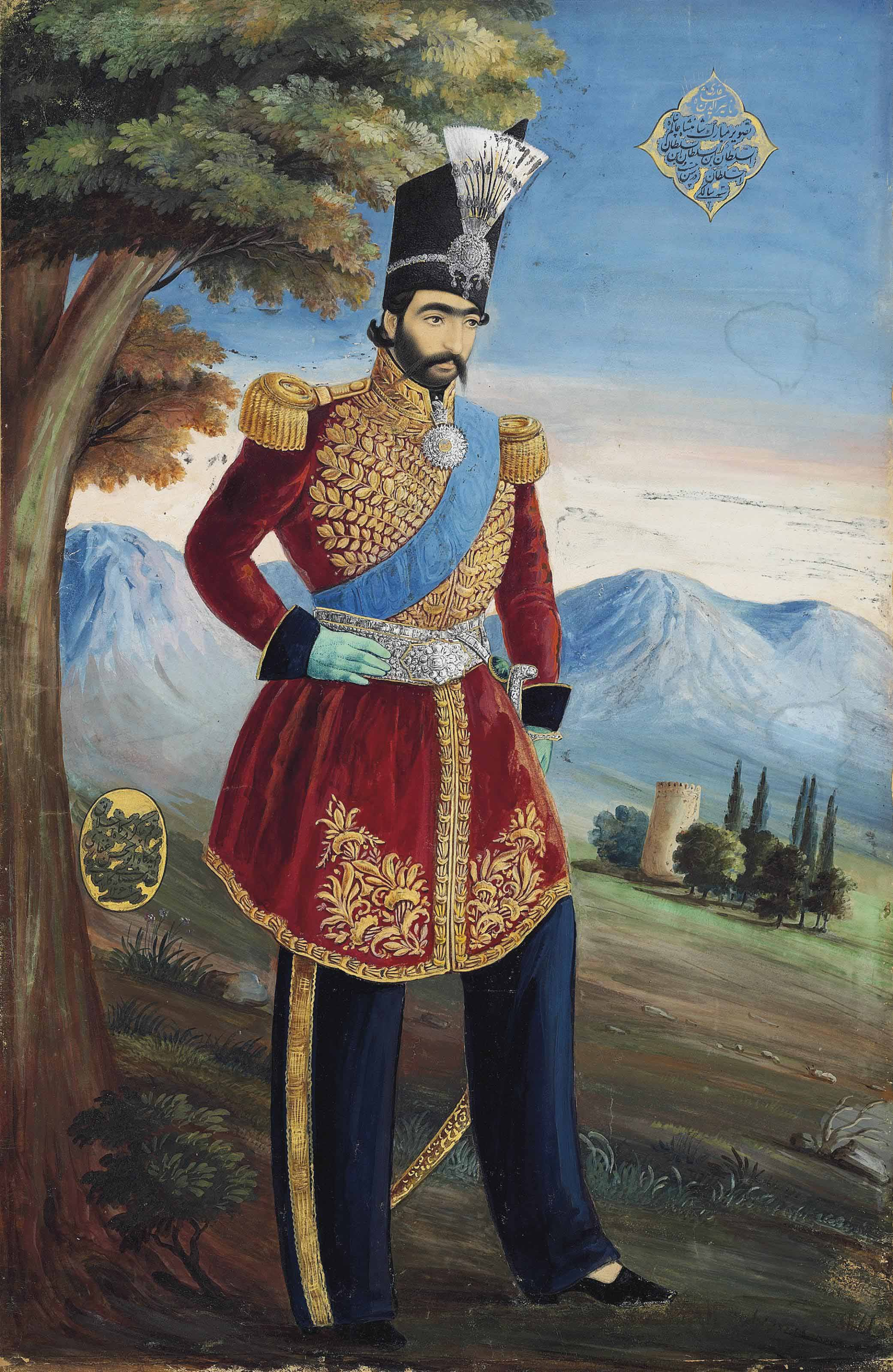
Young Naser al-Din Shah in 1852

There are different opinions about how Naser al-Din Shah and Jeyran became acquainted. According to the modern historian Abbas Amanat, Jeyran was first brought to the Qajar harem in Tehran to learn singing and dancing, and for the first time Naser al-Din Shah saw her among his mother's maidens, and fell in love with her.

In his memoirs, Taghi Khan Daneshvar (Alam Osoltan), the Shah's personal violinist, attributed their acquaintance to one of the Shah's hunting trips to the north of Tehran. He wrote that Naser al-Din Shah was fascinated by her courage and beauty.

In his book, From Forugh Odala to Anis Odala, Khosrow Motazed says the young Naser al-Din Shah met Jeyran during one of his trips to Shemiran, the Qajar shahs' resort. According to him, at their first meeting Jeyran did not recognize the Shah, and while sitting on a mulberry tree and eating berries, she disregarded the Shah, considering him an annoying stranger, speaking with pride and arrogance:

'... The king greeted her slowly. This was the first time that the king of kings greeted one of his subjects ... The girl looked at him with contempt and disregard. She glanced at the king and said, "Go leave me alone ... Go, stranger, go and get lost ...", Naseraddin Shah proposed to her and thus Jeyran joined the Shah's wives.'

—

Mones Odala (court lady of Anis Odala) in her memoirs, also considers that Jeyran met the Shah on one of his travels and tells a similar story. According to her, the Shah, who had met a group of girls under a berry tree during his outing, including Jeyran, was seduced by her black eyes and sent his eunuchs to ask her name and find her father. Then he proposed to her and Jeyran answered in the affirmative.

Regardless of which quote is more authoritative, the important point is that the meeting between Naser al-Din Shah and Jeyran was a chance encounter, and most likely, a while after Amir Kabir's death which was ordered by Naser al-Din Shah himself, even though some still believe that Jeyran was present in the harem by that time and in fact was the one who got Naser's written order to execute Amir Kabir.

Jeyran was a rural girl from one of the deprived classes of society. Naser al-Din Shah, despite having other women, experienced love with Jeyran for the first time, and his love for her gradually reached the level of insanity; so that he could not bear the moments of distance of his mistress.

== Forough ol-Saltaneh ==
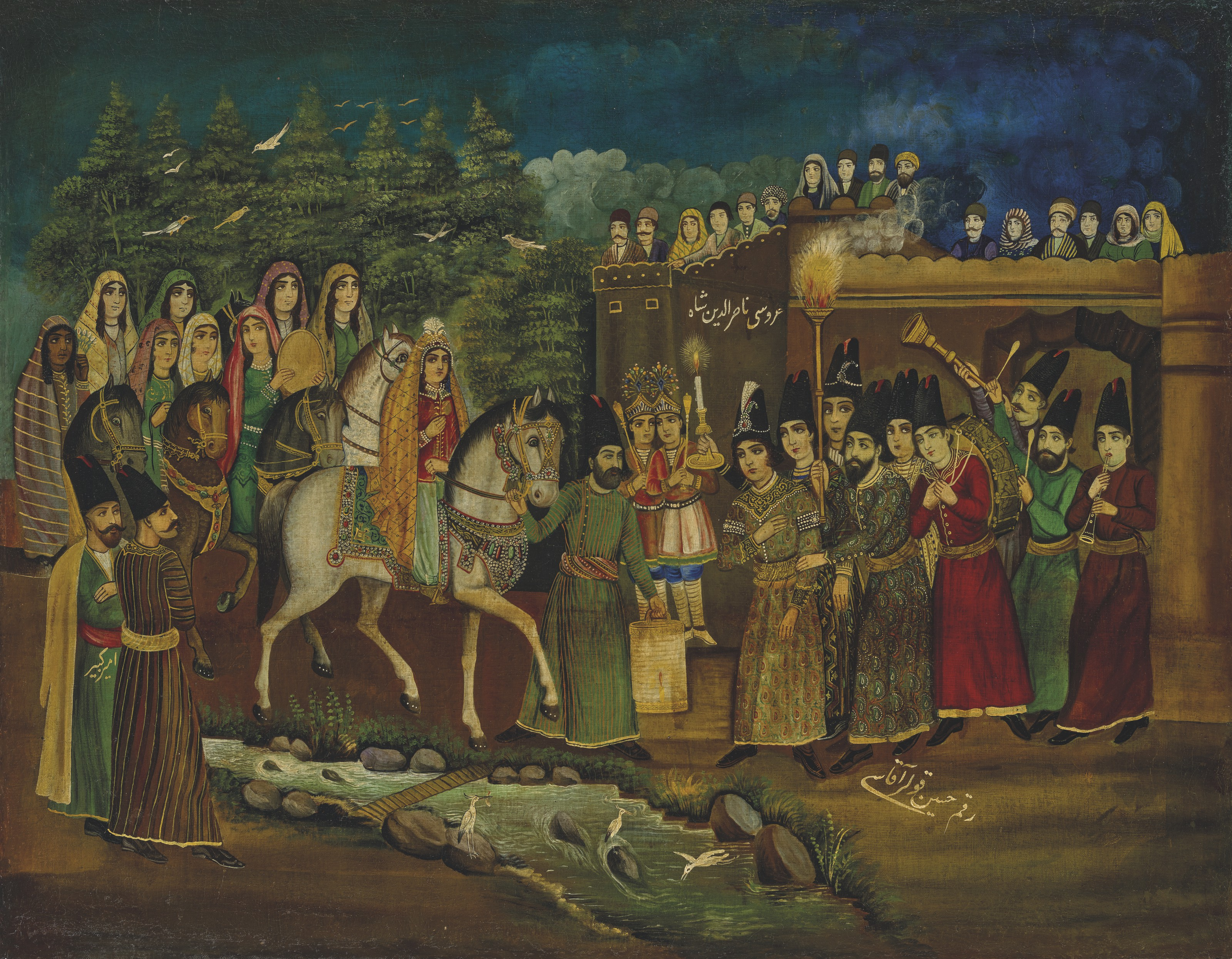
The wedding of Naser al-Din Shah and Jeyran in 1857. Amir Kabir, Naser's first chief minister, is also depicted. Oil on canvas created by Hossein Qollar-Aqasi, Iran, first half of the 20th century

In 1857, Naser al-Din Shah married Jeyran and gave her the title of Forugh os-Saltaneh. It is said that Shah's marriage with her was both an act of his ultimate love for her and also a guarantee to clear the path for making her son, Qasem Mirza (who was 5 at the time and Naser's favorite son), the crown prince, as the crown prince couldn't be the son of a concubine and only of one of the permanent and noble wives of the Shah. Shah's previous crown prince, Moin ad-Din, son of Taj Odala died in October 1856, just months before Jeyran's wedding with Naser al-Din Shah; therefore it is a relieable theory to depict that his death caused Jeyran to start acting towards making her own son the heir to the throne, which for she convinced the Shah into marrying her. It would make her a legitimate wife and give her son the authority to the throne.

A main obstacle to their marriage and Qasem being named the heir, was Jeyran's non-Qajar lineage, as it was the tradition that the Shah's permanent wives and in addition, the heir born from them be of the royal/noble ancestry in both paternal and maternal lines. Aware of her position, Jeyran tried to put pressure on Mirza Aqa Khan Nuri. She collaborated with some courtiers opposed to Nuri, including Yusof Ashtiani and Aziz Khan Mokri. In June 1857, they compiled a list and evidences of the crimes of Mirza Aqa Khan, that was presented by Jeyran herself to him. Nuri invited Jeyran to a feast in his garden, Nizamieh, and promised her to do his best for her and Qasim. With Nuri's support for them, Mahd Olia, who did not agree with Jeyran being a legitimate wife of the Shah and mother to the heir, turned against Mirza Aqa Khan, despite their former long lasting alliance.

With Naser al-Din Shah's agreement to marry Jeyran, there still remained some legal and religious obstacles, which they did overcome. The preparation of a fake lineage that linked Jeyran's lineage to the Ilkhanate and Sasanian royal dynasties was another step in legitimizing her authority for this marriage. Also the Shah already had 4 wives by then and it was not allowed by the islamic sharia law to have more. Therefore Naseraddin Shah divorced one of his wives, Setareh of Tabriz, an azeri noble's daughter, who had been a wife to him for years, to legally make room for and marry Jeyran.

Mahd Olia, the Shah's mother did not hold the preparations for the wedding ceremony, despite the tradition being that whoever was in charge of harem, was in charge of preparations for royal weddings. She was neither present in the ceremony itself, which was a sign of her opposition and enmity to Jeyran and her son's marriage with her. Instead, their wedding preparations was held by Malek Zade, Naseraddin Shah's sister who was a friend and supporter to Jeyran.

Now as Jeyran going higher in ranks and becoming one of the Shah's wives, Mirza Aqa Khan entered into negotiations with the representatives of the Russian and British governments to persuade them to support Qasim Mirza as crown prince. He also asked Jakob Eduard Polak, a court physician, to confirm that Mozaffar ad-Din Mirza, who was considered a legal choice for crown prince, was physically and mentally weak and didn't deserve to ascend to be shah.

Finally, in September 1857, Mohammad Qasem was officially proclaimed crown prince, and in addition, the Shah named him the commander-in-chief of the army (likely as a sign of his support and affection towards Qasem as his dearest son). One week later, Qasem fell ill, rumors supported by the opposition claiming that Mirza Aqa Khan had poisoned the crown prince, making Jeyran and Shah highly suspicious of Mirza Aqa Khan. Concerned about her opponents' conspiracies, Jeyran refused to admit doctors to her son's bedside, and Qasem passed away just one week after becoming the heir. Naser al-Din Shah and Jeyran were so moved by the incident that according to Polak, "The king did not eat for several days out of grief." and Jeyran is said to have never taken off her mourning dresses ever again until her own death about 2–3 years later.

== Death ==
Jeyran contracted tuberculosis after losing all four of her children in childhood, one after the other, as well as mental depression and grief. Naser al-Din Shah went to her bed several times a day for several hours and administered the medicine with his own hands, but her condition gradually got worse and the medical treatment did not help. Jeyran died in January 1860 with Naser at her bedside.

She's buried in Shah Abdol-Azim Shrine in Ray alongside her husband and her son, Qasem Mirza.

== Children ==
Sons:

- Mohammad Mirza: born 1852, died one week after birth.
- Qasem Mirza: born 1853, died 1857 (Died one week after becoming the official Crown prince)
- Roknaddin Mirza: born 1854, died 1858

Daughter:

- Khorshid Kolah Khanum: born 1855, died 1859

== Appearance and skills ==
Jeyran has been described as beautiful, straightforward and fascinated by hunting and horseback riding. She wore men's boots and clothes while riding, wrapped her veil around her head, and agilely rode horses. She had a chestnut horse, "Ahoo", which she rode with into the mountains and was interested in falconry, as she flied her royal falcon "Ghazal" after partridges. At these times a large group of archers, warriors and servants would be gathered around her, so that if anyone saw this scene they would think it was a royal hunting party. After she met Naser al-Din Shah, she was named "Jeyran" (meaning gazelle) by the Shah because of her big eyes.

Jeyran's fascination with hunting and bold behavior, unlike the usual veiled harem women, attracted the shah's attention more and more. According to Abbas Amanat, "the Shah's attachment to Jeyran was the routine of ordinary love in the modern age and, conversely, the collective life of the harem was individual and private."

Jeyran is the only known woman in Naser's harem that was allowed to join him and the royal Qaravols while hunting and camping.

== Legacy ==
Naser al-Din Shah lived for thirty-eight years after Jeyran's death and, according to many sources, did not forget her for the rest of his life. According to Dost Ali Moayeri, the Shah never gave the title of Jeyran and did not allow anyone to live in her mansion. Sometimes he would go to his wife's former residence alone and spend some time thinking about the past and seeing Jeyran's relics. He wanted to be buried next to Jeyran, and after his assassination in 1898, he was buried next to her.

In Iranian popular culture, Jeyran and Naser al-Din Shah were introduced as a symbol of love and are often compared to Khosrow and Shirin. The reason why Naser al-Din Shah took refuge in his harem for the rest of his life is also considered to be the result of Jeyran's death. Naser wrote poems about Jeyran in which he praised her beauty and how painful her death was.

After her death, one of her maidens, Anis al-Dawla gradually rose to become the new mistress of Naser al-Din Shah. Many historians believe that she reminded the Shah of Jeyran.

=== In popular culture ===
The 2022 Iranian series Jeyran is based on her life. Parinaz Izadyar portrays Jeyran in this series.
