= Aziz al-Soltan =

Iranian royal page (1879–1940)

Aziz al-Soltan (Persian: غلام‌علی خان عزیزالسلطان, 1879–1940) was a favourite of Naser al-Din Shah Qajar of Iran (r. 1848–1896).

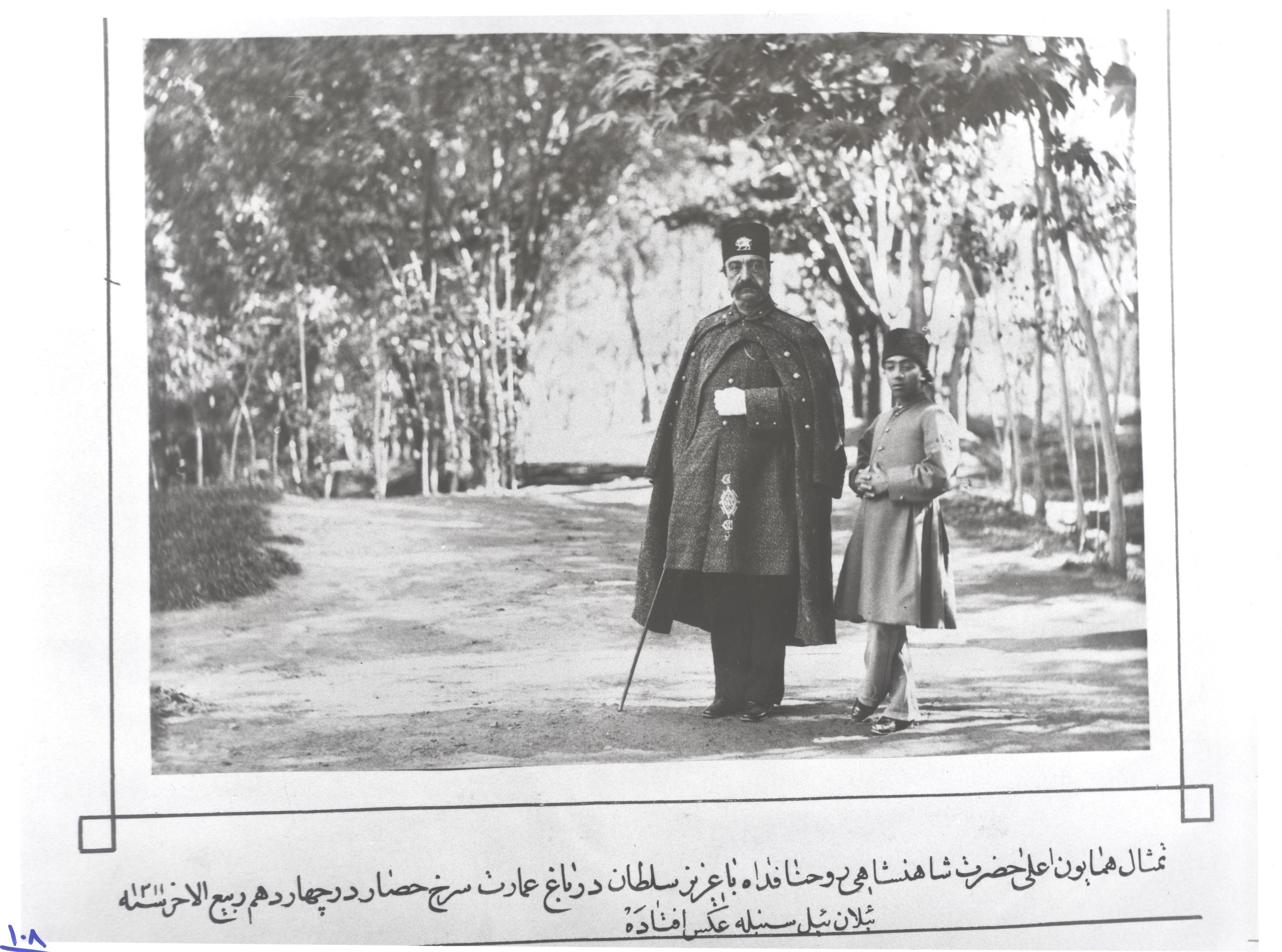
Aziz al-Soltan and Naser al-Din Shah Qajar at the Sorkh-e Hesar garden, 1893

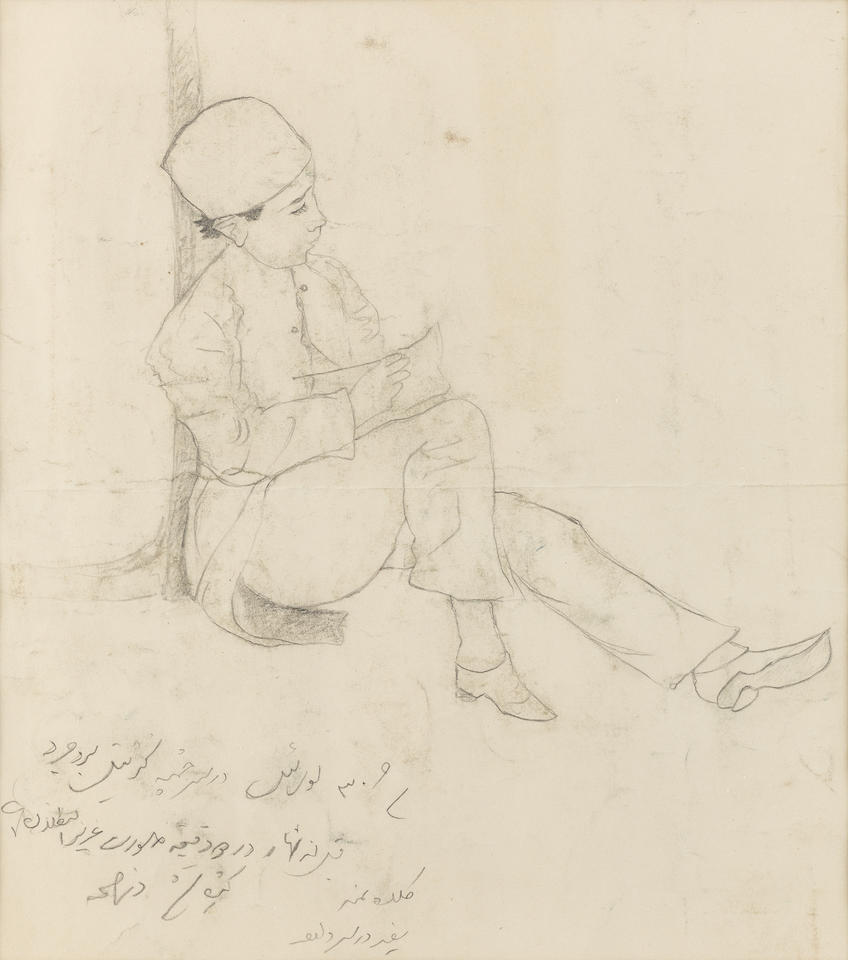
Drawing of Aziz al-Soltan by Naser al-Din Shah, 1892

He was a nephew of one of the shah's favorite wives, Amina Aqdas. He was introduced to court where he became a page and swiftly a favorite of the shah, a position supported by his aunt. The shah spent a fortune on him, who was commonly known as Malijak, and his favorite position and the privileges and money spent on him attracted much negative publicity and made him disliked by many circles at court.

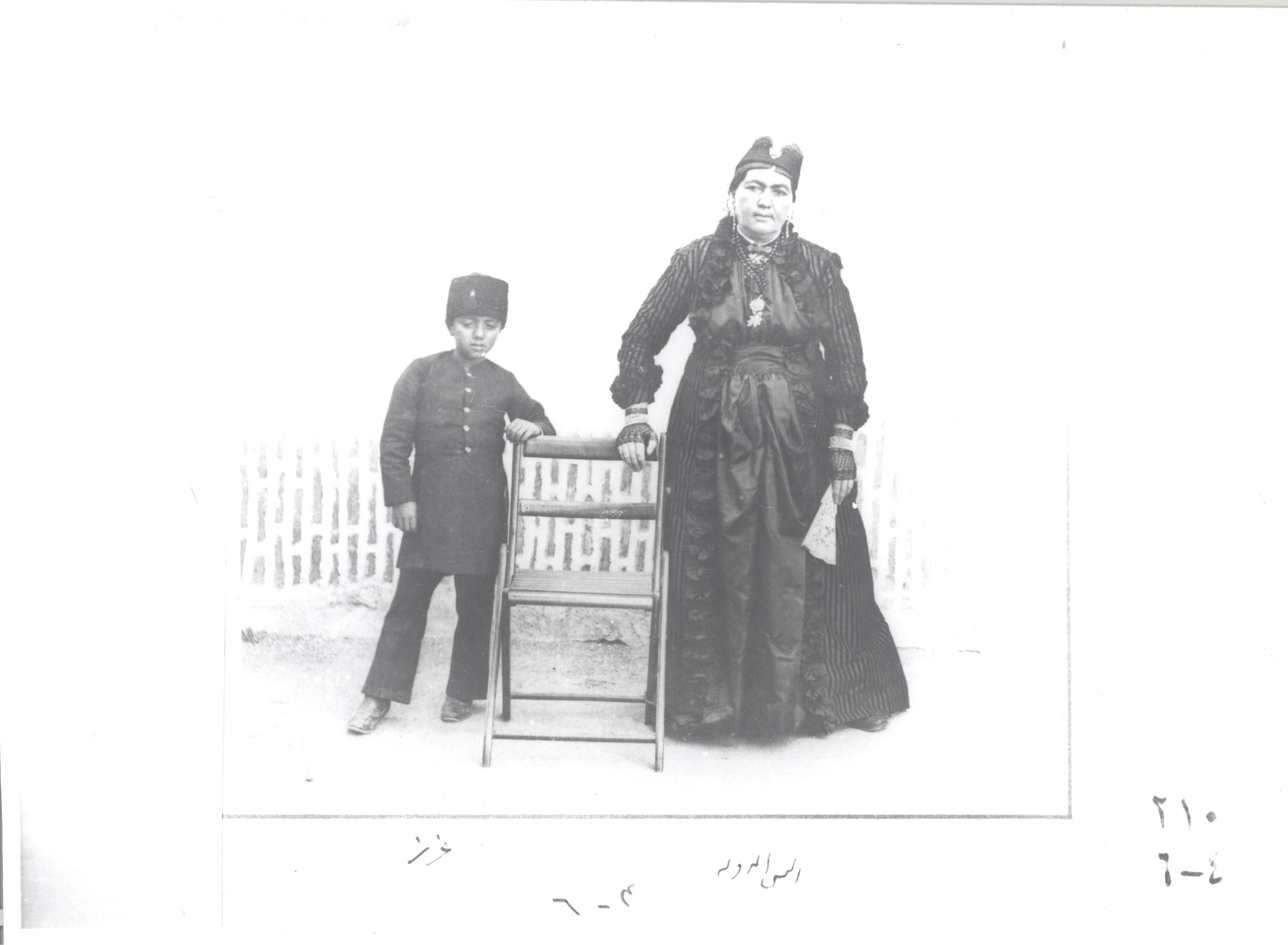
Aziz al-Soltan and Anis al-Dawla
