= Anis al-Dawla =

Iranian royal consort (ca. 1842–1896)

Anis al-Dawla انیس‌الدوله
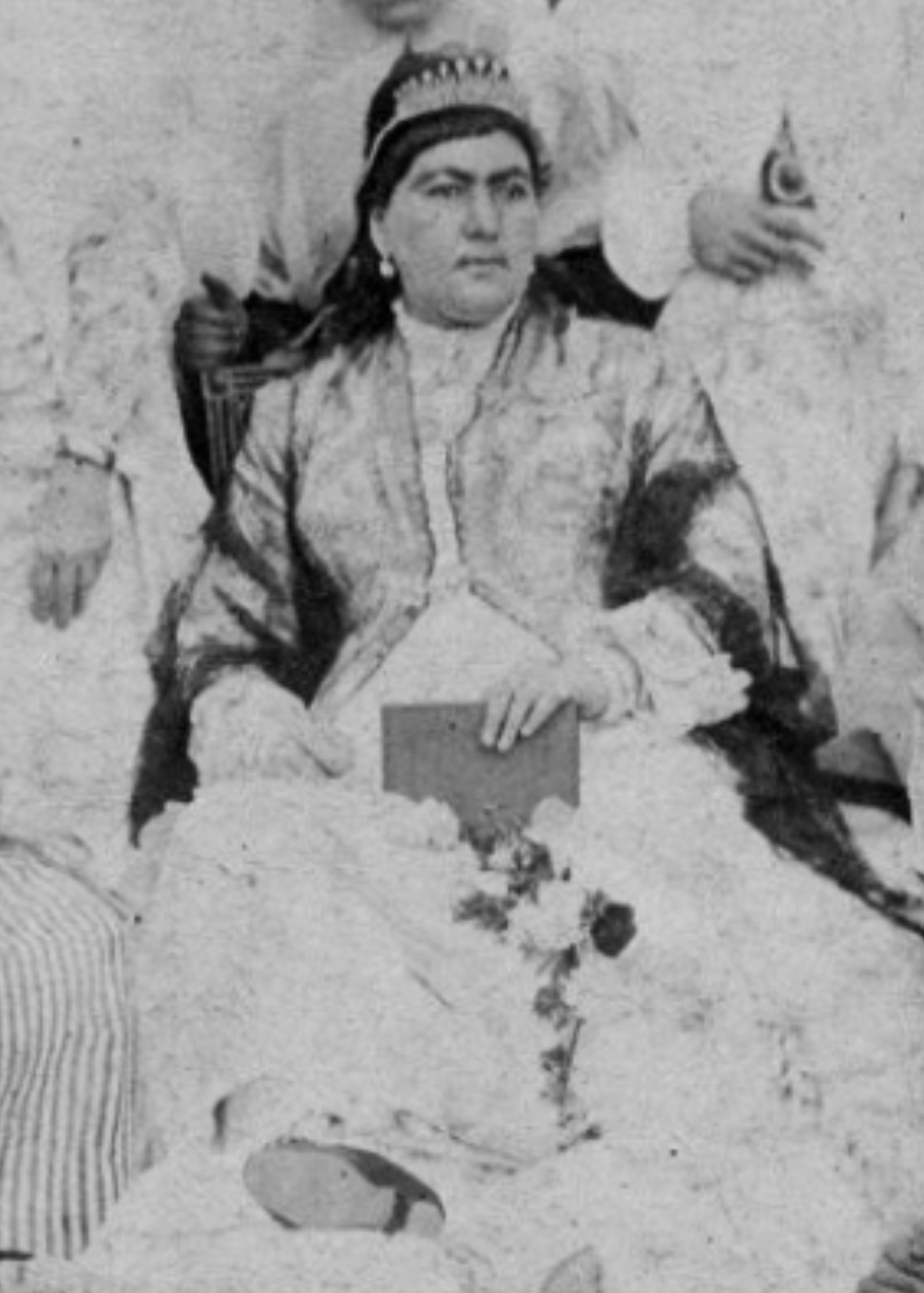
- Photograph of Anis al-Dawla in the Andarun of Golestan Palace

Imperial consort of Qajar Persia
- Tenure: ?–1896
- Born: c. 1842; Ammameh, Qajar Persia
- Died: 1896; Tehran, Qajar Persia
- Consort of: Naser al-Din Shah Qajar
- Dynasty: Qajar
- Religion: Islam

Fatemeh (Persian: فاطمه), more widely known by her title Anis al-Dawlah (Persian: انیس‌الدوله, c. 1842 – 1896) was a royal consort of Naser al-Din Shah Qajar of Persia (r. 1848–1896). The rank of Anis al-Dowleh surpassed that of Naser al-Din Shah’s other wives, and she could practically be considered the Queen of Persia. Anis al-Dowleh acted as the Shah’s principal advisor. She was awarded the “Order of Aftab” and the “Royal Portrait” by the Shah and held the position of head of the Qajar harem, with administrative duties such as receiving high-ranking women. She played an influential role in the politics of Naser al-Din Shah’s court. Due to her support for the people and her criticism of the Shah’s excesses, she was also regarded as a positive and respected figure among the courtiers.

== Life ==
She was born ca. 1842 and was the daughter of an impoverished shepherd from Ammameh in Lavāsān, northeast of Tehran, and was employed as a free maidservant to Jeyrān in the Qajar harem in 1859. She became the shah's favorite after Jeyrān's death in 1860.

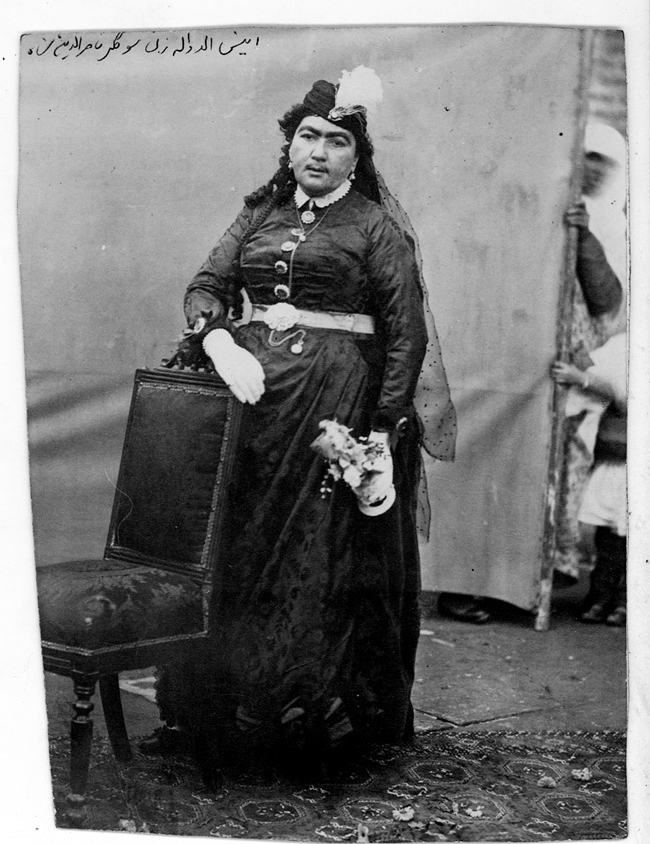
Photograph of Anis al-Dawla

She was the only consort to take meals with Nāṣer-al-dīn, a unique privilege, and to join him regularly at bedtime after he received visits from other wives. She was also the only one to openly criticise him and organise political opposition to government policies that she disagreed with. While the shah had other favorites, such as her own servant Amina Aqdas, she remained his main favorite. He granted the Shahrastanak Palace to her.

She had a great desire to visit the West. In 1873, she did accompany the Shah on his visit to Moscow; however, she was forced to interrupt the visit and return after it became apparent that the host governments was not able to manage the protocol around secluded veiled women. She blamed prime minister Mirza Hosein Khan Moshir od-Dowleh, for her interrupted journey, and managed to have him deposed from his post.

In the harem, she took precedence over all other eighty-five wives (only four of whom were actual wives, the rest of whom being concubines, since a Muslim man can only have four wives). She took over the duties of the shah's mother, Malek Jahan Khanom, after her death in 1873, and was given revenue from districts rather than a salary like the other women. She received the wives of heads of foreign legations and visiting dignitaries. Her influence over the shah resulted in her receiving many appeals from supplicants.

She died soon after Naser al-Din Shah's assassination in 1896.

== Relationship with the Shah ==
Naser al-Din Shah became acquainted with Anis al-Dowleh during one of his hunting trips. While traveling for a hunt near the village of Emameh in the Varjin area (Rudbar-e Qasran), he saw the shepherd’s daughter and, after a short conversation, found her charming and sweet-spoken, bringing her back to Tehran. After Jeyran's death (the Shah’s previous favorite), her house and belongings were entrusted to Anis al-Dowleh, and she gradually gained the status and influence she needed.

Fatimah, being exceptionally intelligent and clever, immediately decided to become educated, and two or three of the harem’s female teachers were assigned to her training. Madame Abbas Golsaz, who was nicknamed Totoo Khanum, taught Fatimah how to dress and behave in the presence of high-ranking people. After a year or two of this training, Naser al-Din Shah personally issued a decree and gave Fatimah the title of “Anis al-Dowleh.” In another account, it is said that after Jeyran’s death, Naser al-Din Shah conferred the title of Anis al-Dowleh upon her.

It can be claimed that almost all writers considered her morally exceptional. Taj al-Saltaneh writes about her: she was so wise and virtuous that, despite not having a beautiful face, she was the foremost respected woman because of her good character. At the time I am referring to, she was nearly thirty years old, of average height, very simple, calm, dignified, dark-skinned, with an ordinary—perhaps even slightly unattractive—face, yet very authoritative. All the wives of foreign ambassadors were received at her residence and attended her on holidays and formal occasions.

Anis al-Dowleh sent the Shah a new set of underwear every day and gave the previous day’s set to poor Sayyids.

In the harem, Anis al-Dowleh was called “Khanum Khanum-ha” (the Lady of Ladies), and during the greeting ceremonies of the women, Khanum Khanum-ha—that is, Anis al-Dowleh—stood ahead of the Shah’s wives, side by side with Mahd-e Olia, Naser al-Din Shah’s mother.

One day, Naser al-Din Shah, ignoring Ayatollah Shirazi’s fatwa forbidding tobacco, ordered his servant to prepare a hookah. When the hookah was brought, the Shah reached out to take a puff. Suddenly, Anis al-Dowleh, the Shah’s influential and beloved wife, hurried out of the chamber. Dragging her skirt and out of breath, she snatched the hookah from before the Shah and smashed it to the ground with all her strength, shattering the glass, wood, and coals instantly. With a powerful voice, she said, “You are the Sultan of Islam. If you engage in something declared forbidden, your subjects will follow your example.” The Shah, surprised, asked, “Who said it is forbidden?” Anis al-Dowleh immediately replied, “The very one who made me lawful for you.” Naser al-Din Shah fell silent, lowered his head, and said no more.

Anis al-Dowleh’s confrontation was so effective that it rendered the Shah passive; he no longer even dared to ask his own servants for a hookah.

Anis al-Dowleh had a garden and mansion in the western part of Shahreghaniyeh, featuring several rooms arranged in a row. Naser al-Din Shah had gifted this garden and mansion to her, and later she transferred it to Aqa Ali Khajeh, who had served her for a long time.

== Political life ==
After Malek Jahan Khanum's death, the management of the Qajar harem was entrusted to Anis al-Dowleh. Queen Victoria sent a diamond necklace to Tehran through her minister to give to the Shah’s favorite wife. When the minister asked the Prime Minister which of the Shah’s wives was the favorite, and the Prime Minister conveyed the question to the Shah, the Shah replied, “Bring that necklace for Anis al-Dowleh.” Consequently, the wife of the British minister went to the royal harem and placed the Queen of England’s necklace around Anis al-Dowleh’s neck! Then, by the Shah’s order, Haji Totoo Khanum—who was Madame Abbas, the Frenchwoman—wrote a letter in French on behalf of Anis al-Dowleh to the Queen of England and sent a precious turquoise bowl with several small silk carpets as gifts from Anis al-Dowleh to the Queen.

Throughout her time with the Shah, Anis al-Dowleh enjoyed special respect, and the Shah even consulted her on certain political and state matters. Since Anis al-Dowleh was thoroughly familiar with the Shah’s character and temperament, most of the time whatever she requested was granted. For this reason, anyone who had a petition for the Shah tried to convey it through Anis al-Dowleh. He never resisted her wishes, accepted her intercessions, heeded her advice, and considered her one of his closest advisors.

Naser al-Din Shah took her along on his European trip in 1873. Anis al-Dowleh, who had always been surrounded by her female attendants, became impressed with European ways and was probably ready to emulate them. Up until they reached Moscow, she was still fully covered and wore a veil, keeping her distance from men. It was in the Russian capital that it became clear she could no longer remain hidden, as the Tsar and his wife insisted she appear among officials without a veil. Faced with the Russian court’s protocol dilemma, the Shah had no choice but to send Anis al-Dowleh back to Tehran. She protested and blamed Moshir al-Dowleh for her humiliating return. Yet it is easy to imagine the severe consequences that the ulema’s opposition or the unveiling of the Shah’s wife in Europe could have caused.

Upon her arrival in Tehran, Anis al-Dowleh orchestrated a kind of courtly coup, involving Qajar princes and Tehran’s clerics, which led to Moshir al-Dowleh being temporarily removed from his post immediately after his return. Some historians believe that the main reason for Anis al-Dowleh’s opposition to Sepahsalar was not his return from the European trip, but rather her effort to consolidate her own position in Naser al-Din Shah’s harem—a factor in which the Shah himself played a greater role than Sepahsalar.

Undoubtedly, Anis al-Dowleh’s opposition, backed by her presence in the royal harem and her position as the foremost lady of the court, played a significant role in the dismissal of Mirza Hossein Khan Sepahsalar. Her influence among Sepahsalar’s opponents was so strong that accounts say the leaders of the opposition gathered at Anis al-Dowleh’s house and staged a sit-in when the Shah returned to Iran and stopped in Rasht. Thus, referring to a letter that Anis al-Dowleh wrote to Naser al-Din Shah years later, it becomes clear that her actions were not based solely on her position as the Shah’s wife or on resentment over not accompanying him on the trip.

In September 1873, when Naser al-Din Shah returned to his homeland, the resistance from the Qajar princes, his favorite wife Anis al-Dowleh, the courtiers, and some Tehran clerics regarding the Reuters concession was so intense that the Shah, while still in Anzali, was forced to dismiss Mashir al-Dowleh from the position of Prime Minister and temporarily appoint him as governor of Gilan, ordering him to remain there.

Anis al-Dowleh was so capable and respected that even Naser al-Din Shah’s brothers and sons would turn to her for help in times of trouble. At one point, the Shah appointed his brother, Mohammad Taqi Mirza Rokn al-Dowleh, as governor of Fars. However, before Rokn al-Dowleh had even settled in, another influential figure offered a bribe of fifty thousand toman, and it was decided that he would replace Rokn al-Dowleh as governor. When Rokn al-Dowleh heard this, he wrote a letter to Anis al-Dowleh pleading for her intervention: he explained that he had given many gifts to assume the governorship of Fars and it was unfair for him to be dismissed so soon.Anis al-Dowleh forwarded this message to Naser al-Din Shah, writing: "I humbly place myself at the feet of Your Exalted Majesty! Rokn al-Dowleh has just gone to Fars. Why dismiss him? If more gifts are required, he can provide them himself. Otherwise, the subjects will suffer—if the governor changes every day, the poor people will be ruined".

The Shah responded in the margin of her petition: "Anis al-Dowleh! Rokn al-Dowleh will remain in Fars and will not be dismissed; it has been done as you requested! I have sent the reply through Agha Yaqut. Rest assured!"

Anis al-Dowleh was displeased with the premiership of Haji Mirza Hossein Khan. For this reason, when he arrived in Rasht, he was dismissed from his post. Shortly afterward, at Imamzadeh Hashem, he was reappointed as Prime Minister due to certain petitions. However, near the Manjil Bridge, upon receiving letters from ministers and commanders, he was once again completely removed from the premiership and this time assigned as governor of Gilan and Rasht.

Esma’il Masoud, famously known as Mo’tamed al-Dowleh, was one of the eleven sons of Mass'oud Mirza Zell-e Soltan. At the age of seven, he went with his father to meet Naser al-Din Shah. The Shah, taking notice of him, granted him a village from the Isfahan revenues on the recommendation of Anis al-Dowleh.

Whenever Anis al-Dowleh learned that a foreign ambassador intended to leave Iran, she would organize a reception in the harem in their honor for the women to bid farewell. One of these ambassadors recounts: “When I was summoned to the United States that year and had to leave Tehran, Anis al-Dowleh invited my wife and daughter to attend a small reception held in their honor within the harem, where the farewell ceremony took place".

== Administrative duties ==
She played an influential role in the country, wielding significant influence over Naser al-Din Shah and intervening in the appointment and dismissal of important government officials.

She held such influence and power that a special minister was appointed to manage her affairs, and she even had a female secretary by her side—an unprecedented arrangement in European history as well. Anis al-Dowleh maintained her own independent court, and when major foreign ambassadors met with the Shah, they also recorded their names in her registry. Precious gifts and royal orders from foreign monarchs were presented to the Qajar court in honor of “Anis al-Dowleh—the Queen of Persia.”

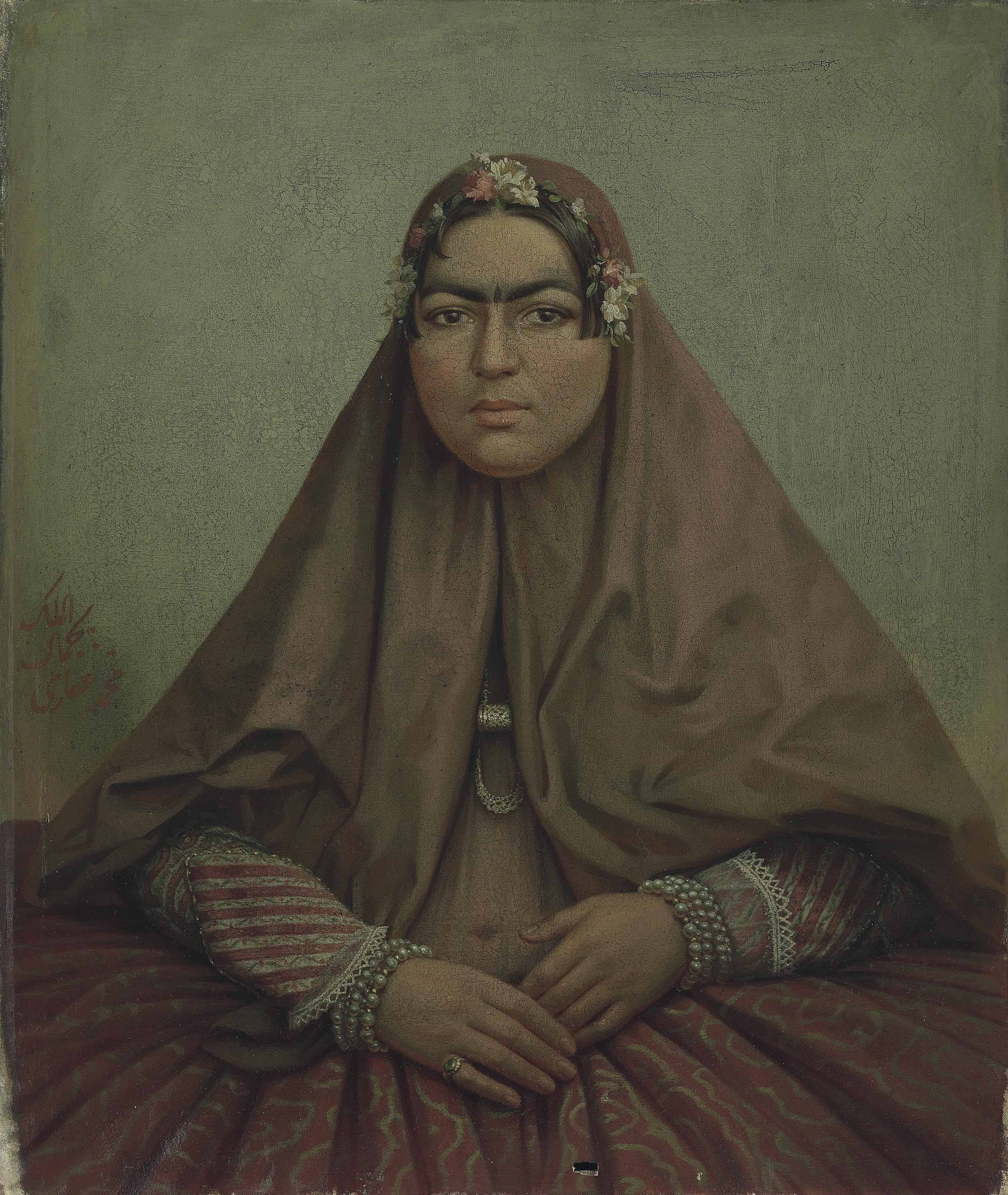
Portrait of Anis al-Dawla by Kamal-ol-molk, late 19th century

In 1298 AH, at the request of Anis al-Dowleh, Naser al-Din Shah granted her control over the city of Kashan. From that time onward, Anis al-Dowleh appointed the governor of the city, and all its taxes were given to her minister. Anis al-Dowleh had E‘tedad al-Dowleh dismissed from his position, and in his place, Iqbal al-Dowleh, Mirza Mohammad Khan Kashani Ghafari, was appointed governor of Kashan. The main condition of this appointment was that governmental affairs be conducted according to the advice and consultation of Anis al-Dowleh. In 1287 AH, Naser al-Din Shah granted the city of Qom to his wife, Anis al-Dowleh, who in turn appointed her brother, Haji Habibollah Khan, as governor of Qom. Anis al-Dowleh had a separate and grand harem establishment, complete with her own private kitchen, a dedicated coffeehouse, and a fixed staff with assigned salaries.

Anis al-Dowleh was Naser al-Din Shah’s favorite for over 35 years and, in fact, was considered the Shah’s queen after Jeyran’s death. E‘temad al-Saltaneh wrote about her popularity with the Shah: “The royal harem belongs entirely to this woman. If she dies, woe to Iran". Anis al-Dowleh, as the Queen of Iran, hosted princesses, noblewomen, the wives of ministers, and foreign ambassadors’ wives during all official court ceremonies, holidays, and the Shah’s birthdays.

Anis al-Dowleh was Naser al-Din Shah’s favorite for over 35 years and, in fact, was considered the Shah’s queen after Jeyran’s death. E‘temad al-Saltaneh wrote about her popularity with the Shah: “The royal harem belongs entirely to this woman. If she dies, woe to Iran". Anis al-Dowleh, as the Queen of Iran, hosted princesses, noblewomen, the wives of ministers, and the wives of foreign ambassadors during all official court ceremonies, holidays, and the Shah’s birthdays.

The Shah’s harem was an extensive and complex institution, and managing it was no task for just anyone. Even the smallest disorder within the harem could damage the reputation of the Iranian court in the eyes of foreign governments. For this reason, the responsibility of overseeing this vast establishment and maintaining balance among the Shah’s wives was entrusted to Anis al-Dowleh. With prudence and authority, she maintained order in the harem and attained a position that reflected Naser al-Din Shah’s complete trust in her abilities. This managerial role, in addition to her status as queen, solidified her political and social power within the Qajar court.

Anis al-Dowleh’s rank surpassed that of Naser al-Din Shah’s other wives, and she could practically be considered the Queen of Iran. She had received from the Shah the “Order of the Sun,” the “Royal Portrait,” and the title of Qadiseh (the Holy One). Unlike the other wives, she wielded such power that she could openly quarrel with the Shah or even withdraw from his presence in protest.

Whatever Anis al-Dowleh proposed to the Shah was carried out. Attending to and appeasing the military and governmental leaders was another of her responsibilities.

== Gallery ==
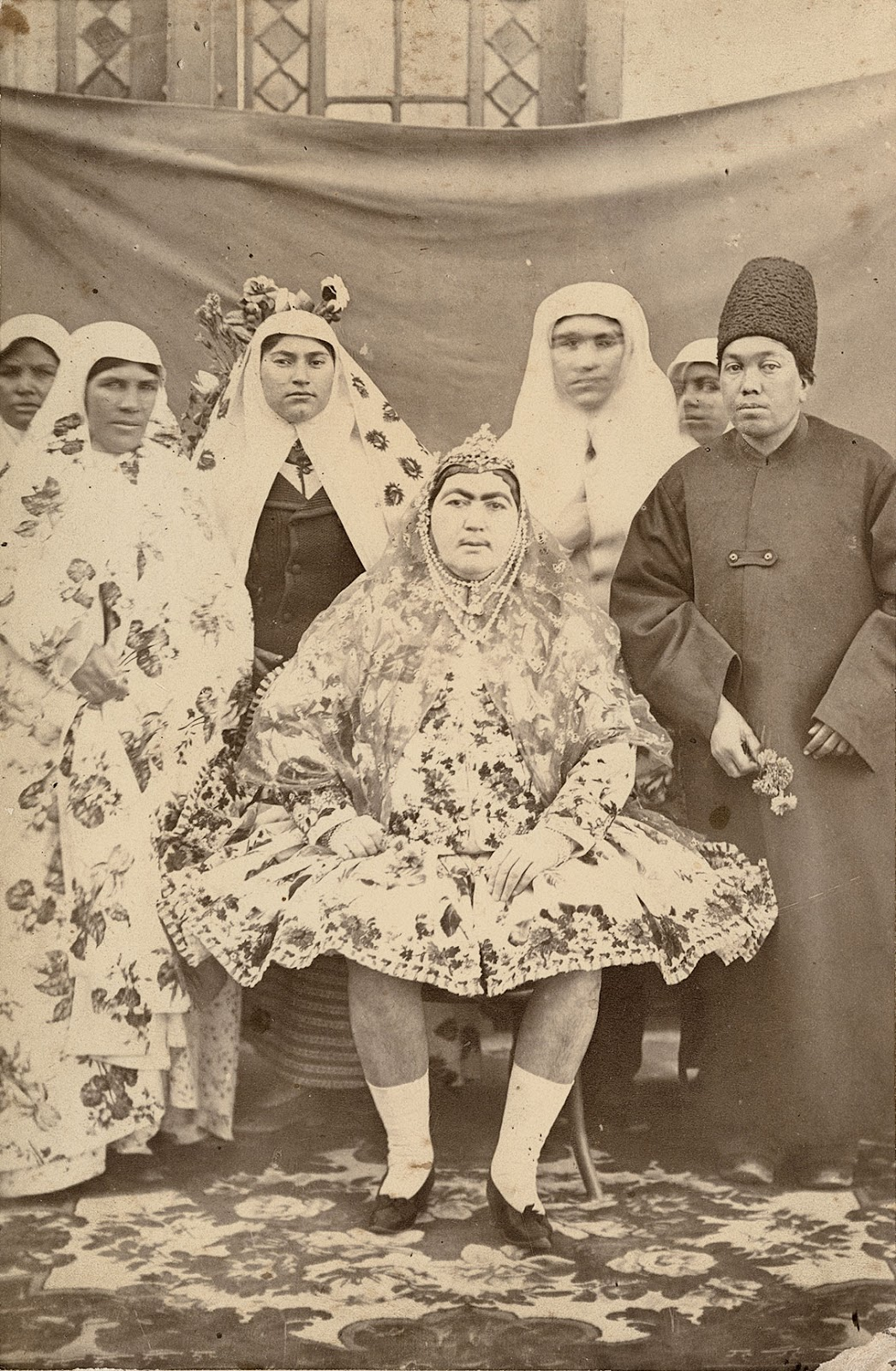
Anis al-Dawla and her retinue (ca. 1870–1880)

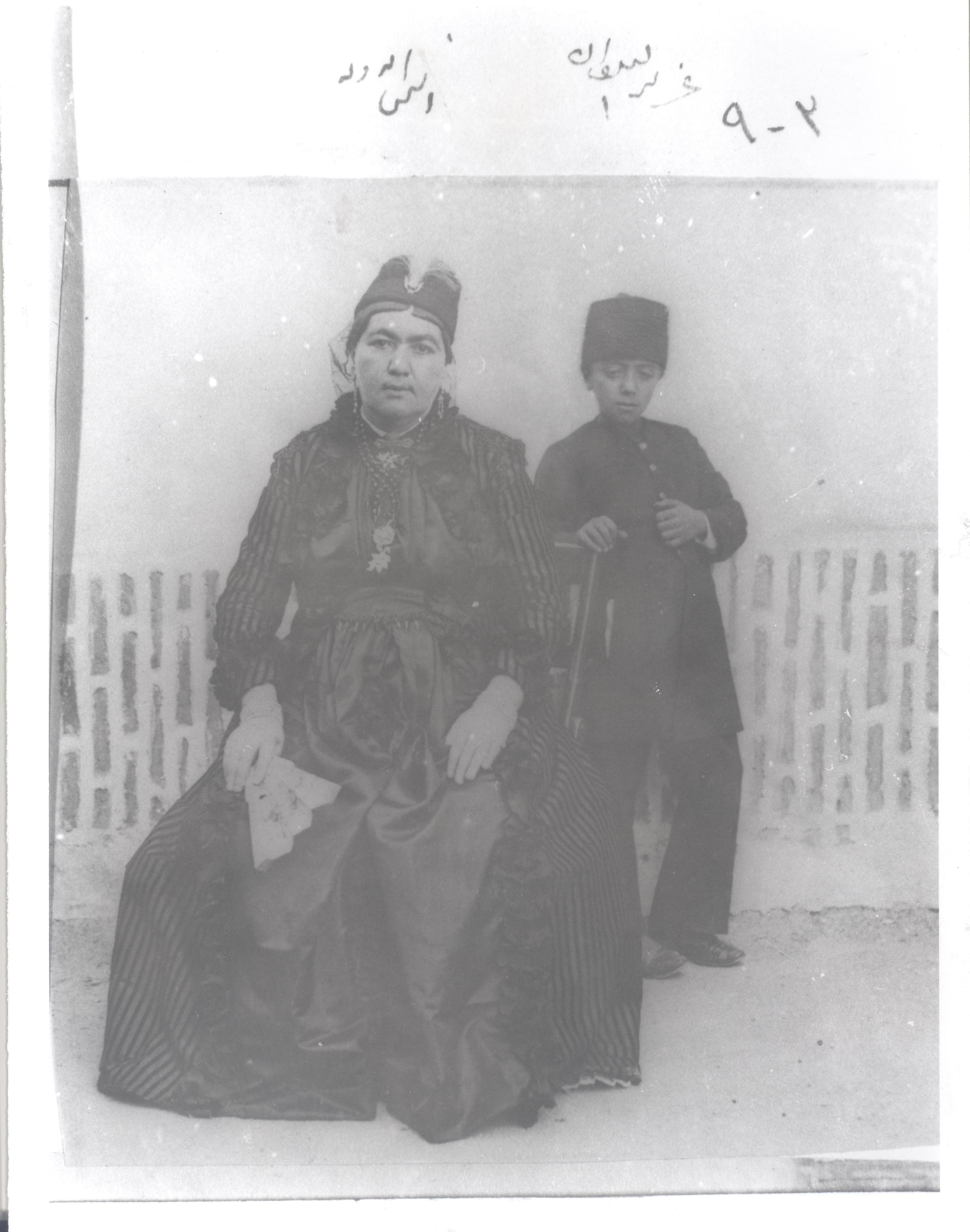
Anis al-Dowleh with Aziz al-Soltan

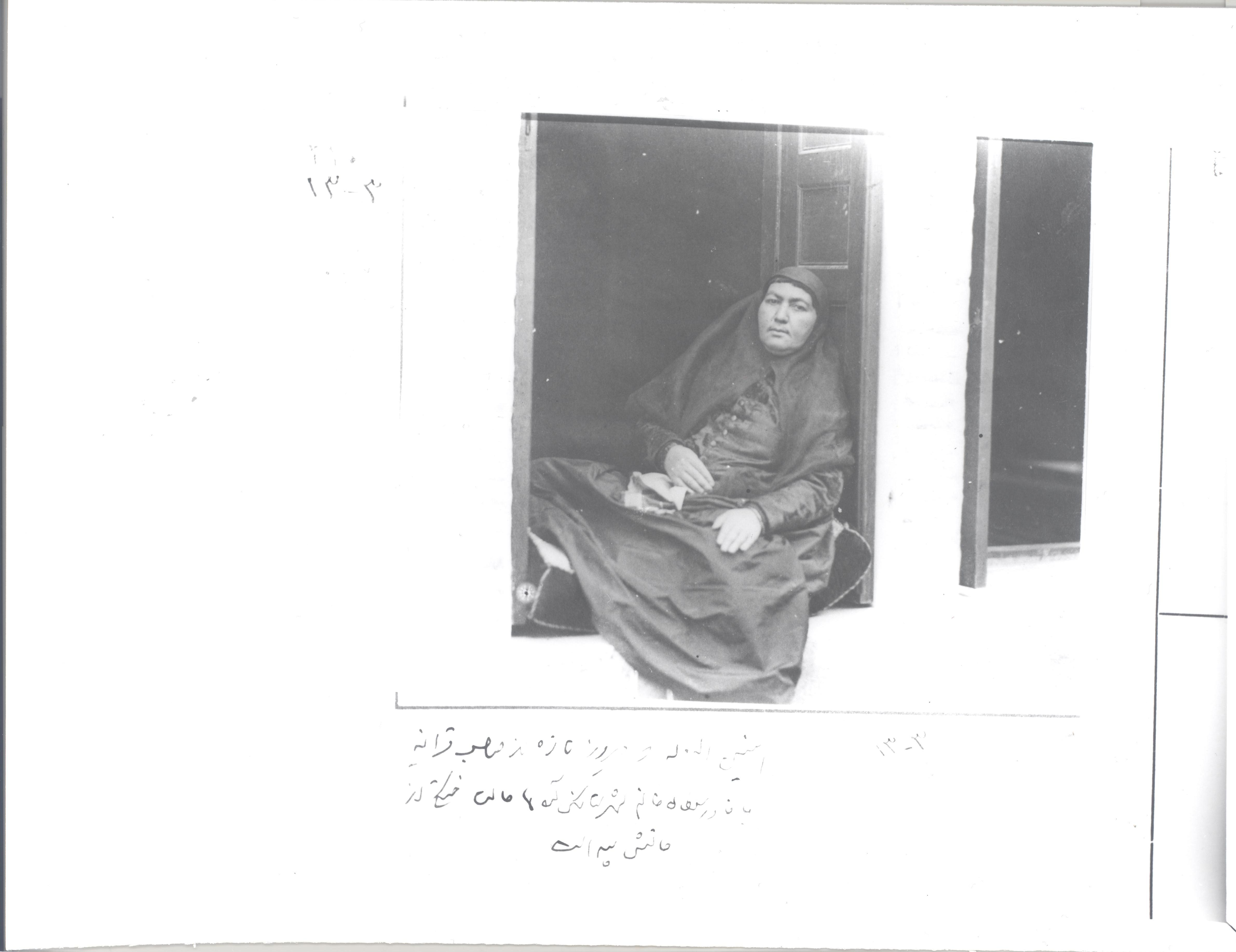
Photograph of Anis al-Dawla

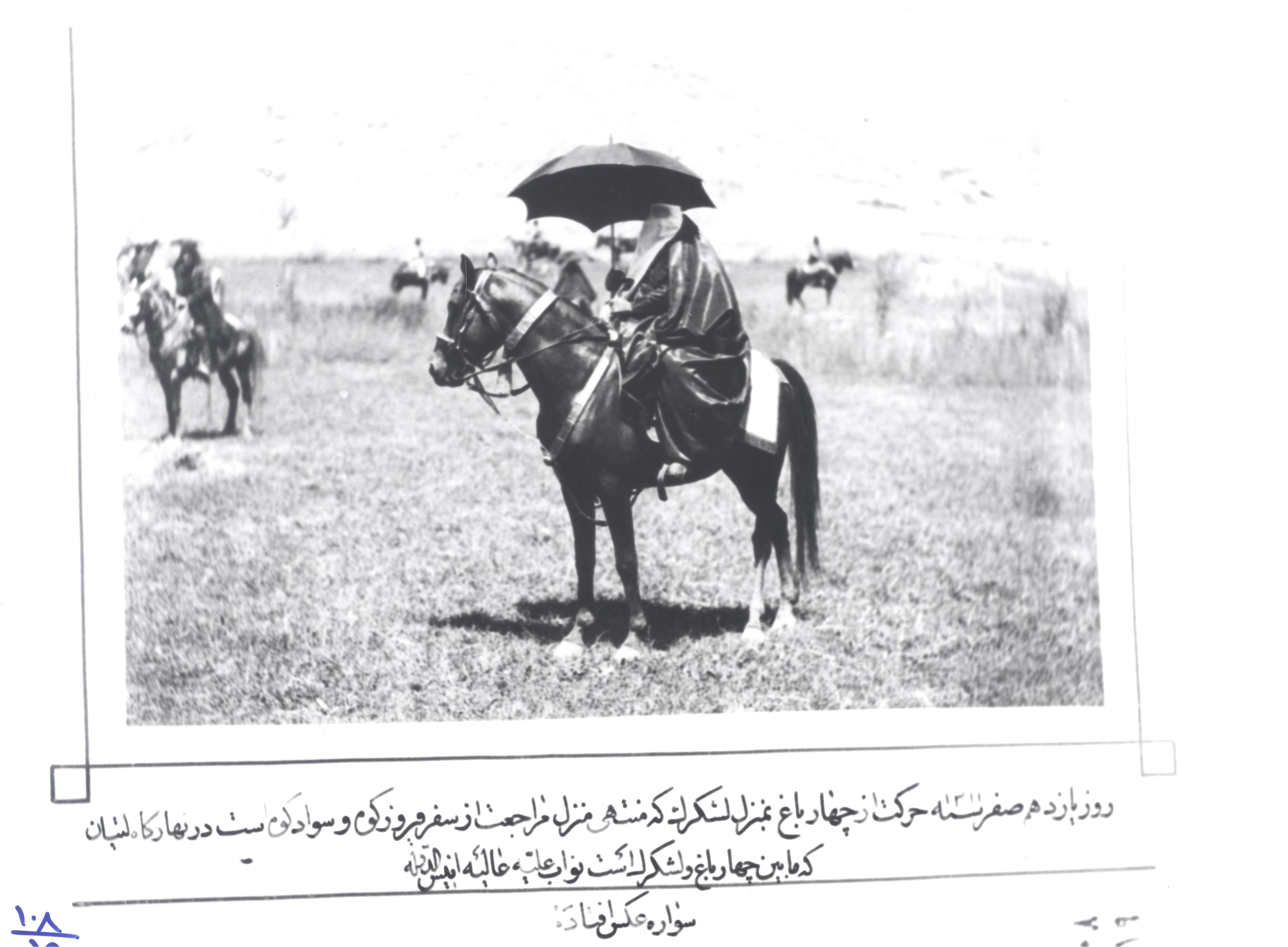
Photograph of Anis al-Dawla, 1893
