= Qajar harem =

Harem of the monarchs of the Qajar dynasty, Iran

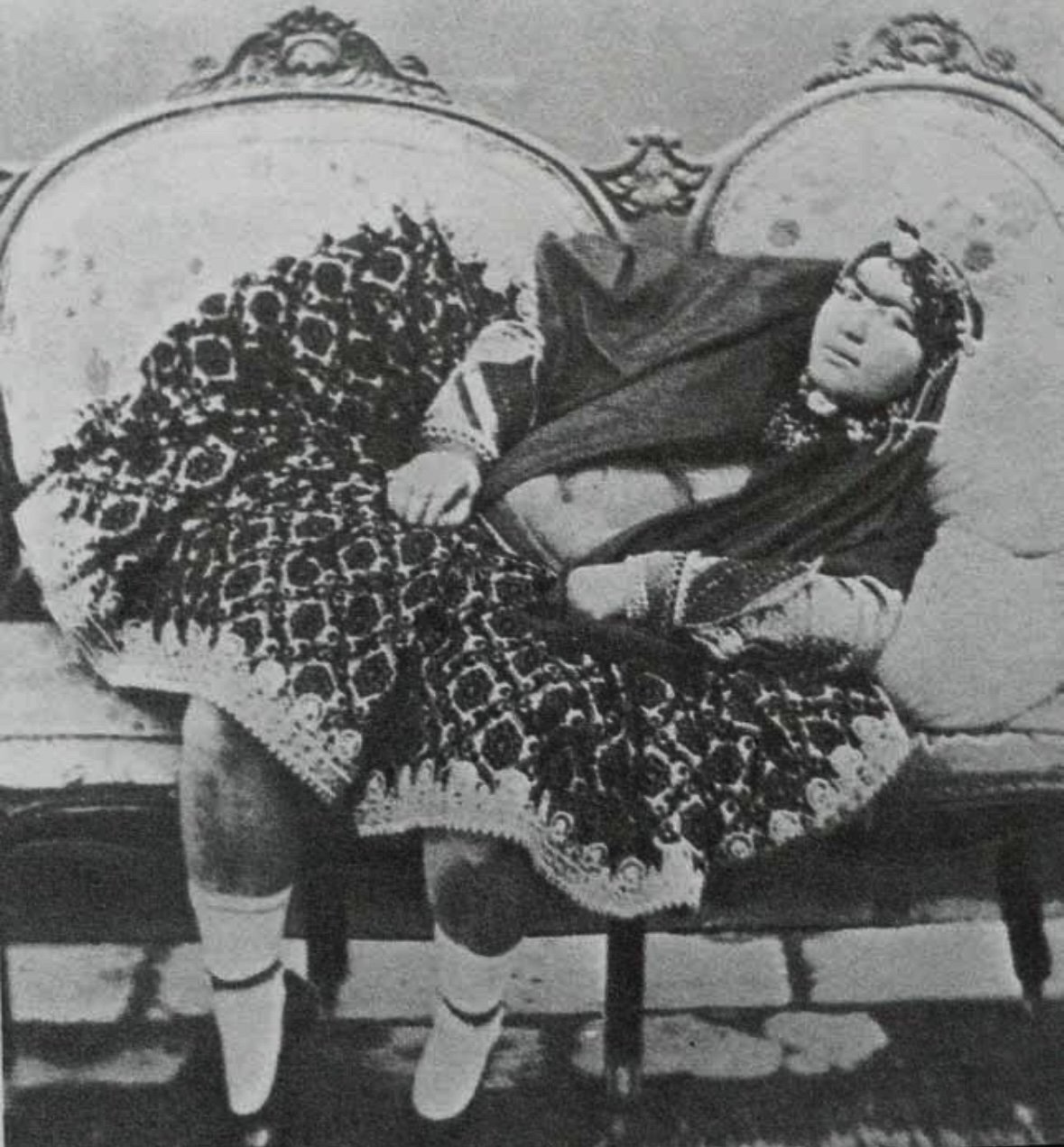
Anis al-Dawla, consort of Naser al-Din Shah Qajar during the 19th century, in the Qajar harem

The Qajar harem (Persian: حرم‌سرای قاجار) was the harem of the monarchs of the Qajar dynasty of Iran (1785–1925) and consisted of several thousand people. The harem had a precise internal administration, based on the women's rank.

== Hierarchy and organisation ==
=== Mother of the Shah ===
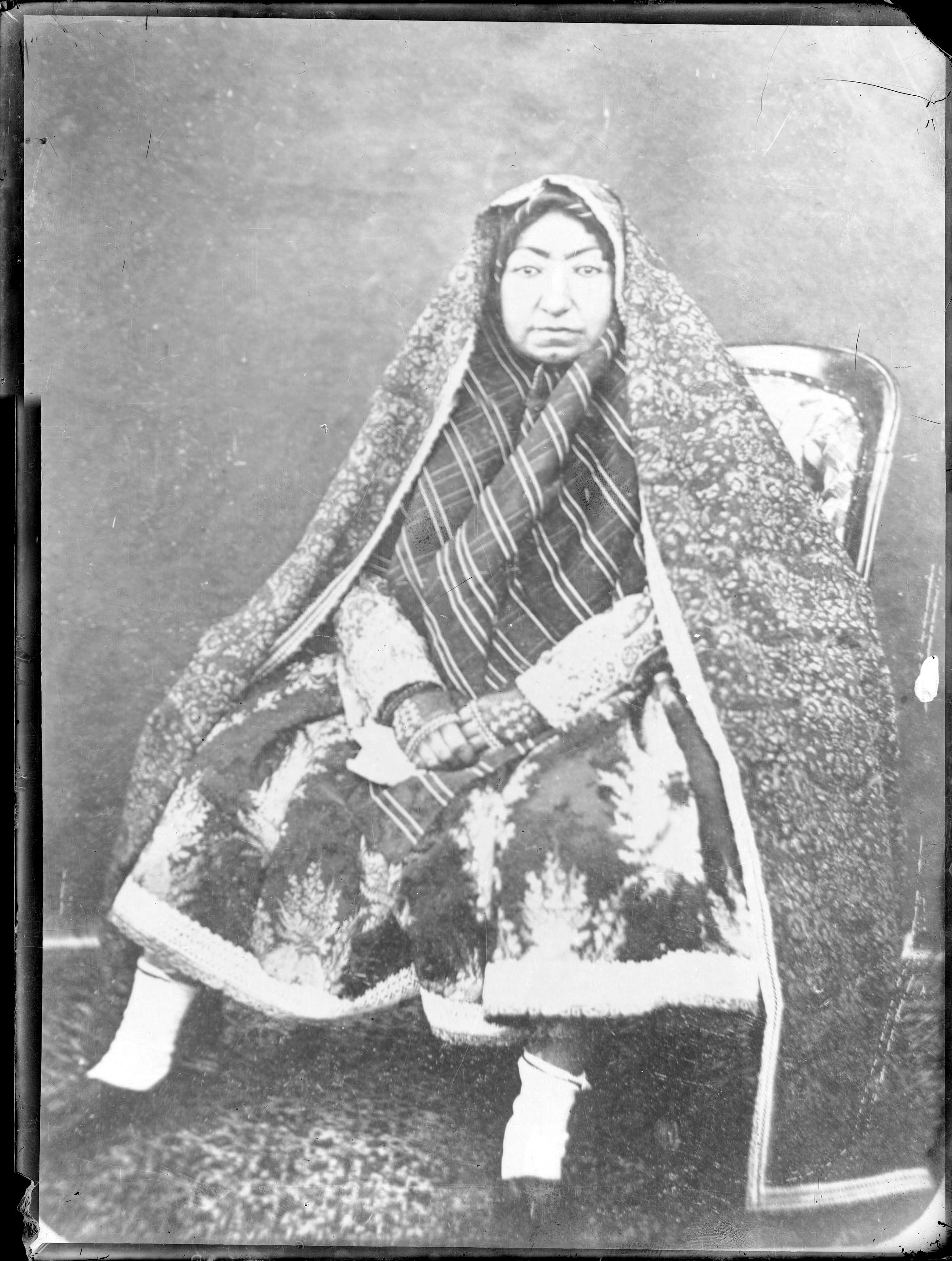
Portrait of Malek Jahan Khanom, the influential mother of Naser al-Din Shah, by Antoin Sevruguin

As was customary in Muslim harems, the highest rank of the harem hierarchy was that of the monarch's mother, who in Qajar Iran had the title Mahd-e ʿOlyā (Sublime Cradle). She had many duties and prerogatives, such as safeguarding the harem valuables, particularly the jewels, which she administered with the help of female secretaries.

=== Consorts ===
In contrast to what was common in the Ottoman Empire, where the sultans normally only had slave consorts, the Qajar shahs also had a custom of diplomatic marriages with free Muslim women, daughters of Qajar dignitaries and princes.

Another phenomena of the Qajar harem was that the Shah entered two different kinds of marriages with his harem women: ṣīḡa (temporary wife), which was often done with concubines, and ʿaqdī (permanent wife), which was a promotion.

The wives and slave concubines of Fath-Ali Shah Qajar came from the harems of the vanquished houses of Zand and Afshar; from the Georgian and Armenian campaigns, as well as from the slave markets (see Circassian slave trade) and presented as gifts to the shah from the provinces.

=== Staff ===
Every consort had white and black slave servants (women or eunuchs), whose number varied according to her status. Some wives had their own residence and stables.

There were different types of female officials within the harem: some managed the royal coffeehouse inside the harem; a body of female sentinels commanded by women officials "protected the king's nightly rest"; women called ostāds (masters) supervised the group of female dancers and musicians who entertained the harem and were housed with their servants in a separate compound.

Young slave boys below puberty (ḡolām-bačča) served as servants and playmates in the harem. Eunuchs were mainly African slaves.

The women of the harem were responsible for everything inside the harem quarters, but the harem were guarded from the other parts of the palace (biruni) by the eunuchs, who together with the visits from relatives, physicians and tailors served as links to the outside world for the women, but the women were normally not allowed to leave the harem themselves except with special permission.

== The harem as a social and political institution ==
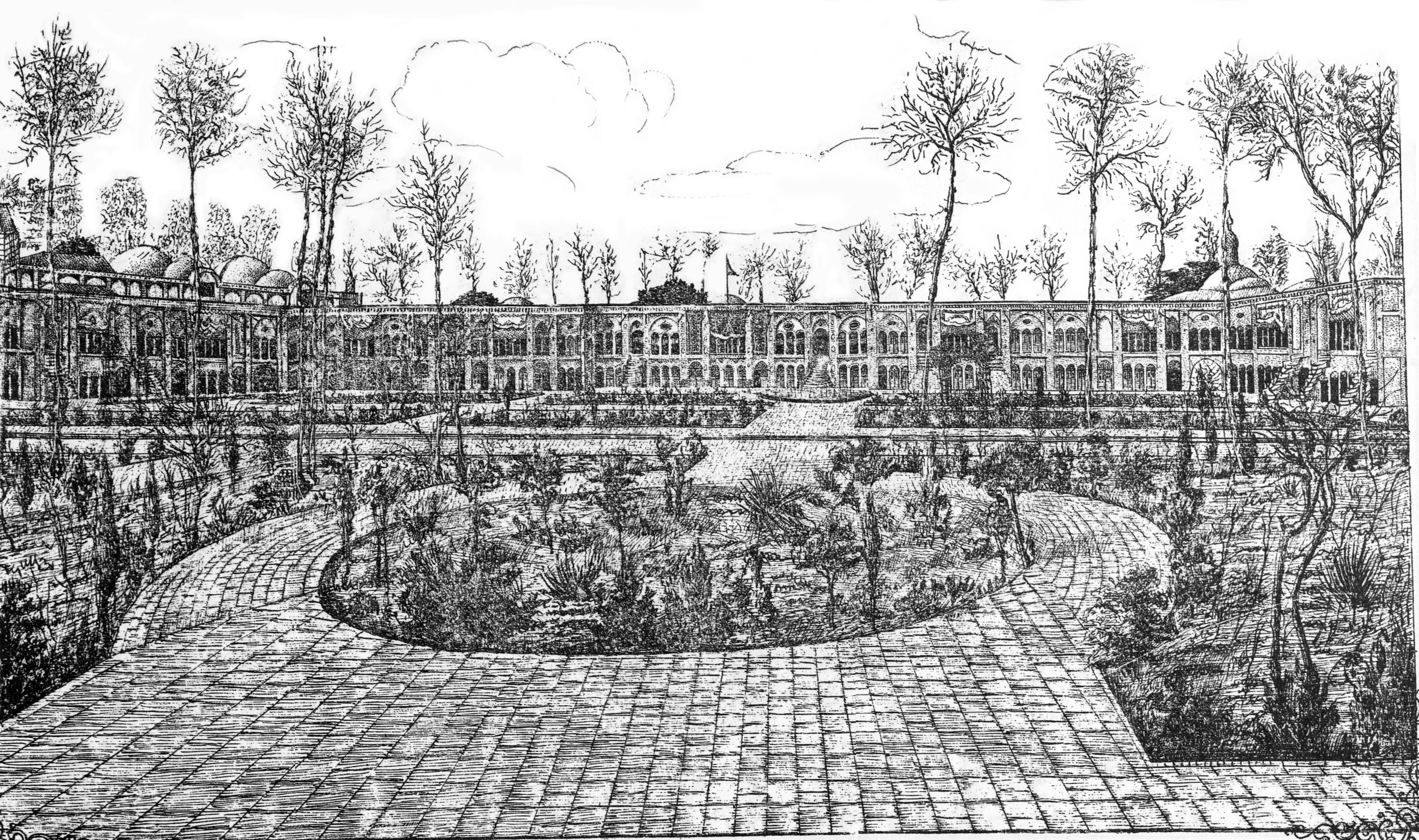
Courtyard of the harem at Golestan Palace, by Abu Torab Ghaffari, 1882

The harem women had daily entertainments such as music, dance, theatrical performances and games. They studied the arts, calligraphy and poetry, and entertained themselves and the shah with music, dance and singing, and by reciting verses and telling stories, which the shah enjoyed at bedtime. The harem had its own theatre where passion plays (taʿzia) were performed, and one of the shah's wives was the custodian of all the paraphernalia. Toward the end of the Qajar era, foreign tutors were allowed into the harem.

Inside the harem, women performed religious functions such as rawża-ḵᵛāni (commemoration of the martyrdom of Imam Ḥosayn at Karbalā); preached from the pulpit on the day of ʿĀšurā (q.v., the 10th of Moḥarram) and directed the ritual of sina-zadan (beating of the chest).

The Qajar harem also had the political influence and intrigues common in royal harems. Until a regulated succession order to the throne was established by Naser al-Din Shah Qajar (r. 1848–1896), the harem was a place of intense struggle by mothers of potential heirs to have their own sons elected heir to the throne as well as material benefits for themselves, higher ranks for members of their own families, or precedence for their own children. Naser al-Din Shah's mother, Malek Jahan Khanom, wielded major influence which secured his own succession and the dismissal and subsequent assassination of Prime Minister Amir Kabir, and Naser al-Din Shah's favorite wife, Anis al-Dawla, brought about the dismissal of the Premier Mirza Hosein Khan Sepahsalar in 1873. Both Persian policymakers as well as foreign diplomats, therefore, sought support within the royal harem.

The last Qajar ruler to have a big and traditionally organised harem was Naser al-Din Shah (r. 1848–1896). After Naser al-Din Shah, the royal harem diminished, and Mohammad Ali Shah (r. 1907–1909) is known to have had only one consort, which was a term for his marriage to his cousin, princess Malekeh Jahan.

== Qajar harem gallery ==
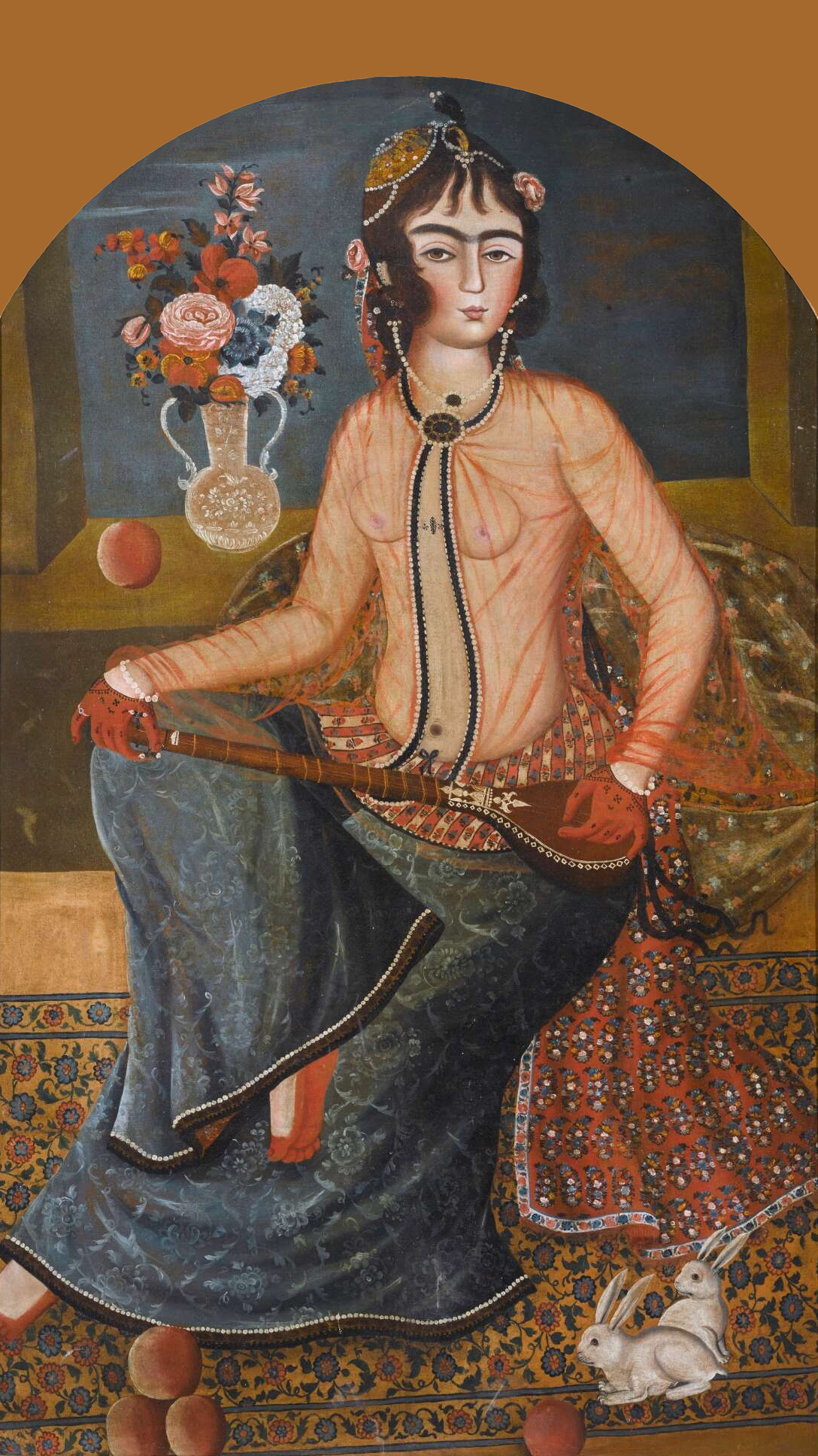
Woman with setar or dutar

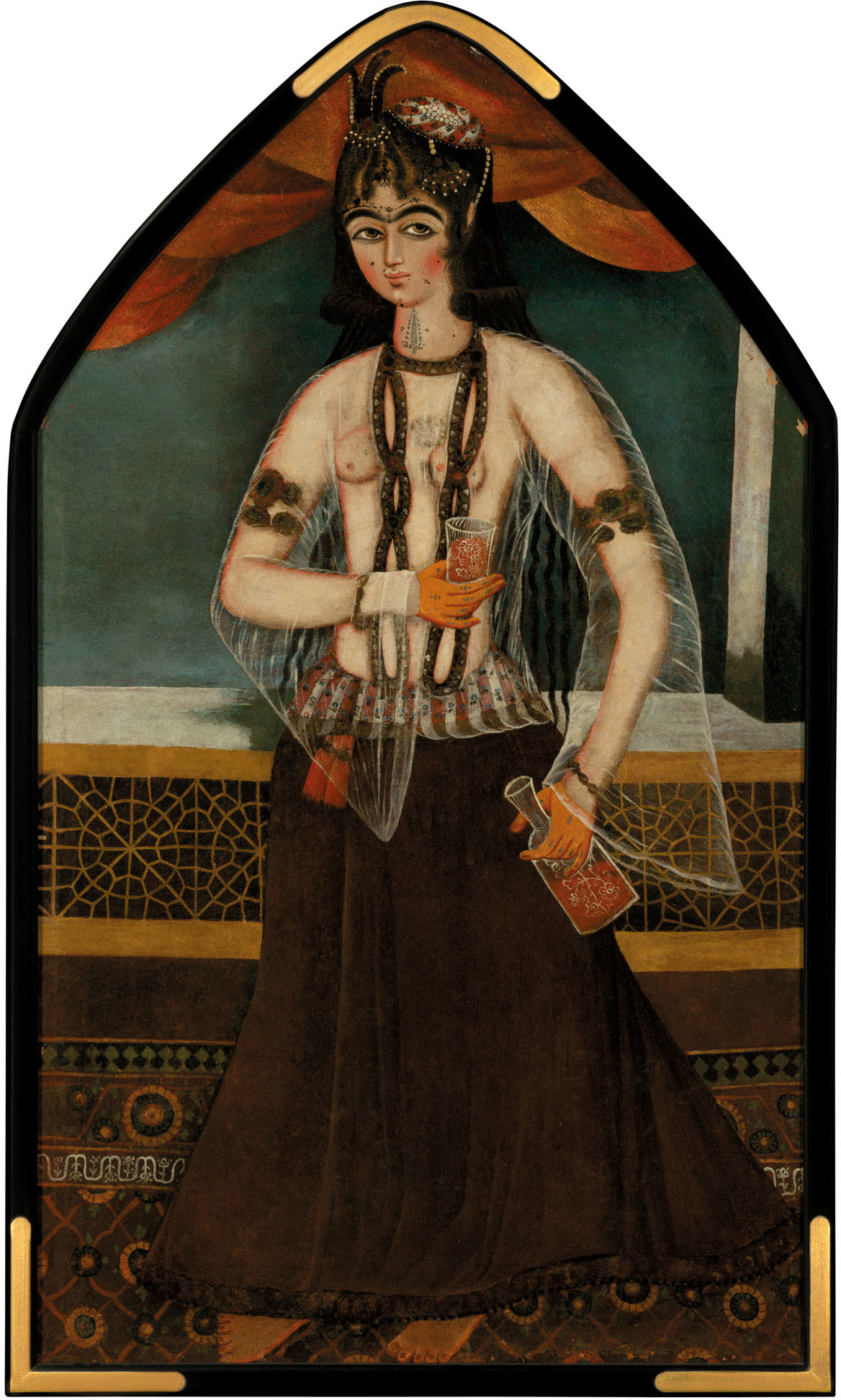
Woman holding a bottle and glass

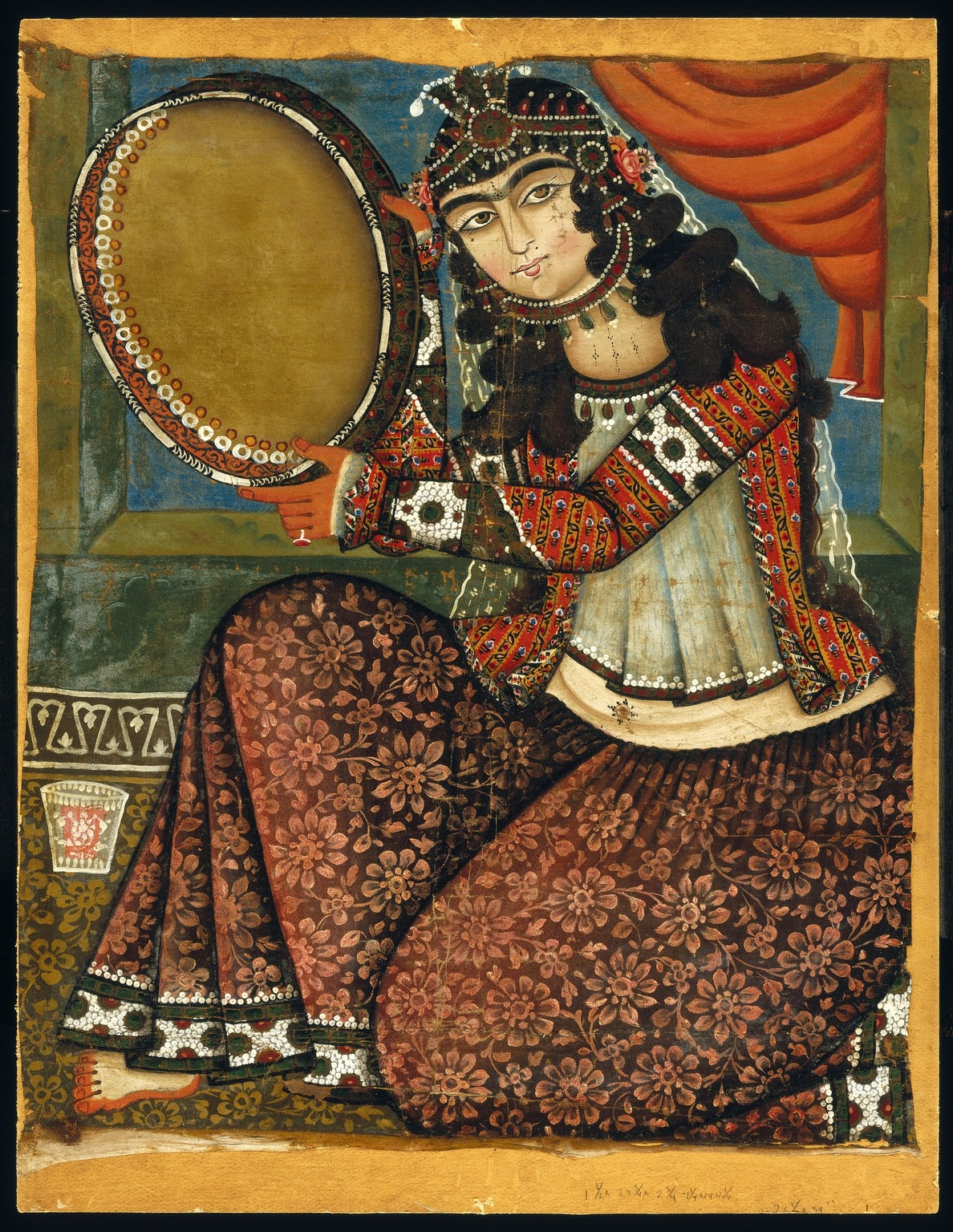
Woman playing a daf

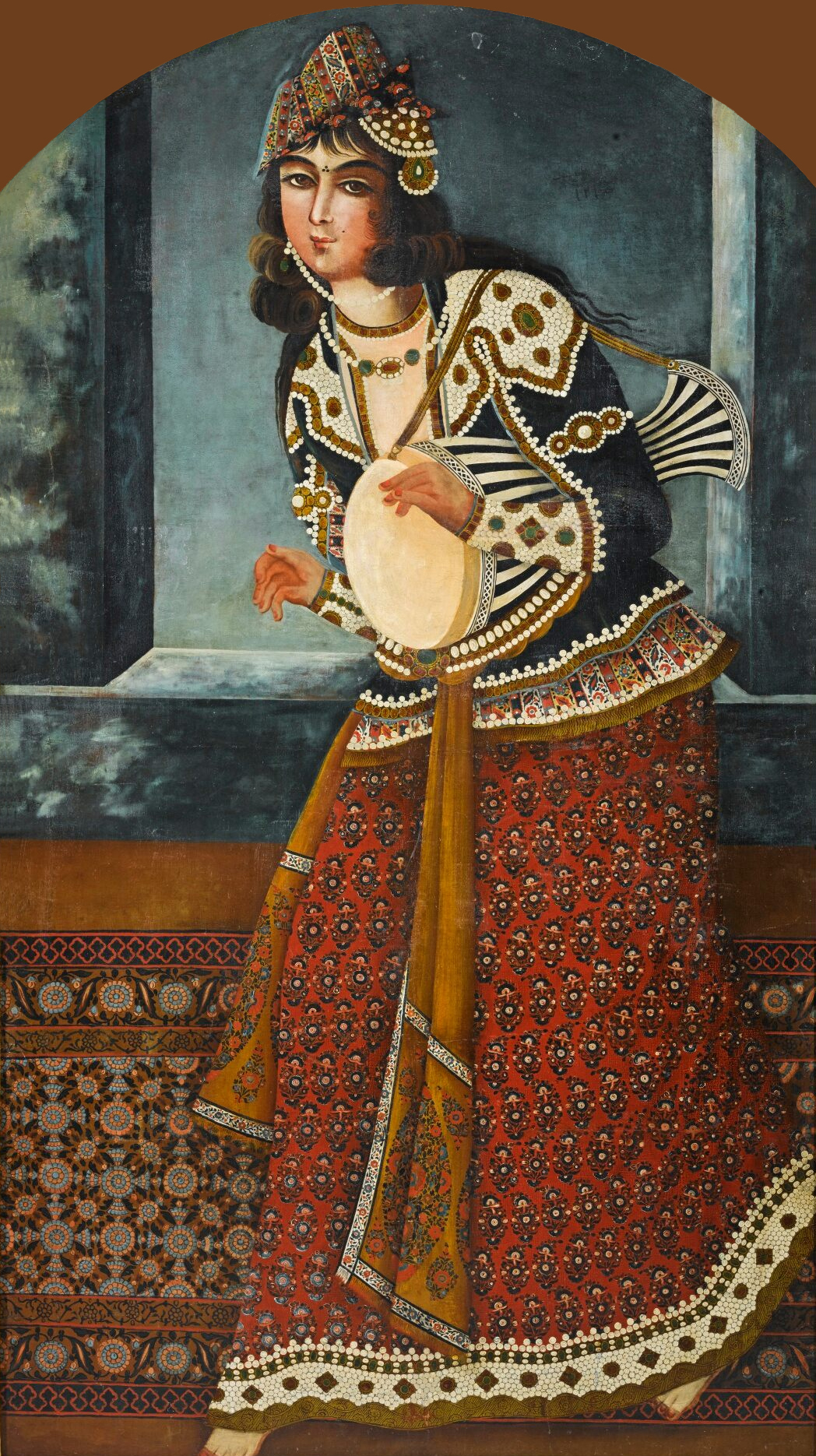
Woman playing a zarb

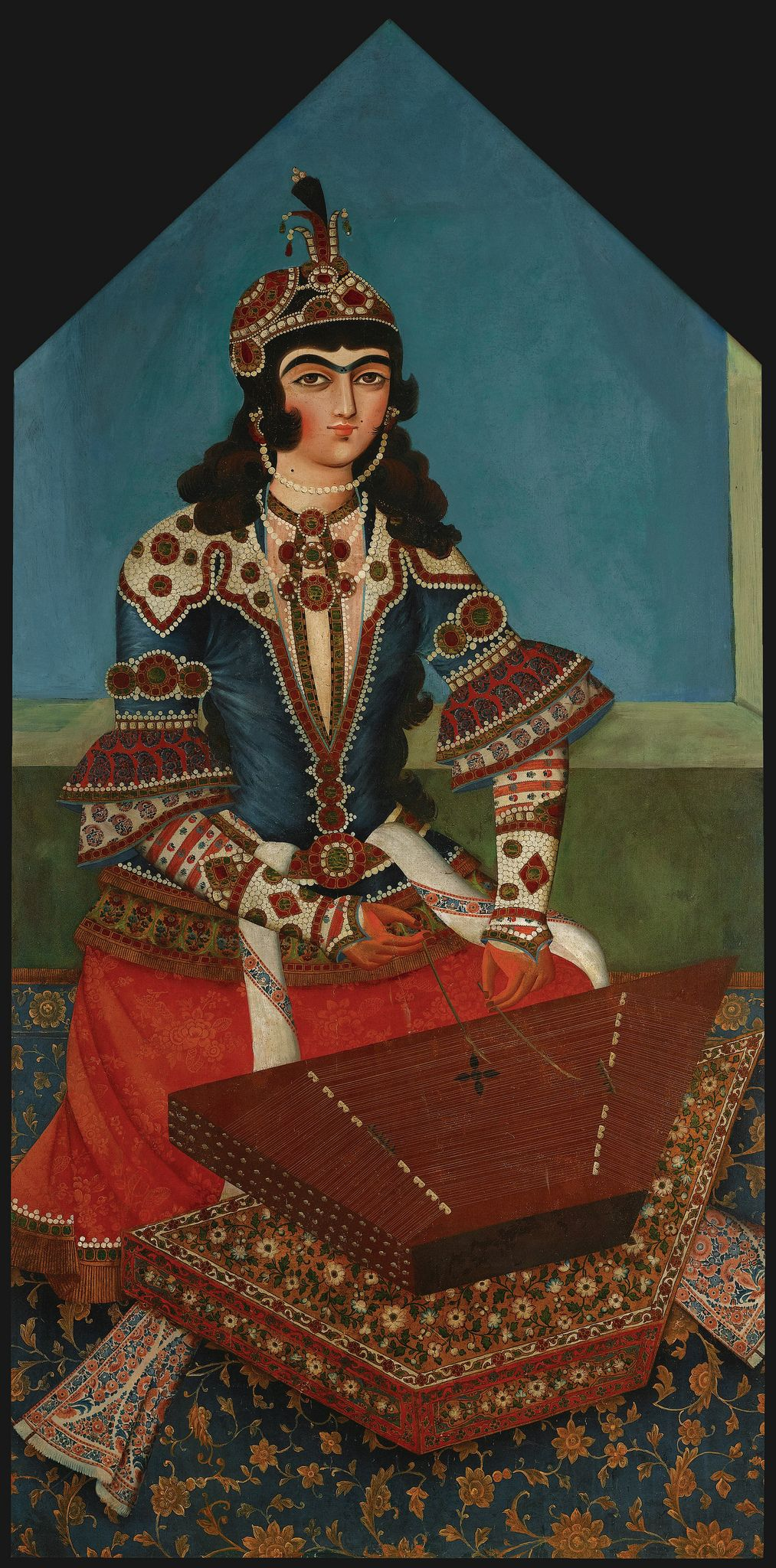
Woman playing a santur

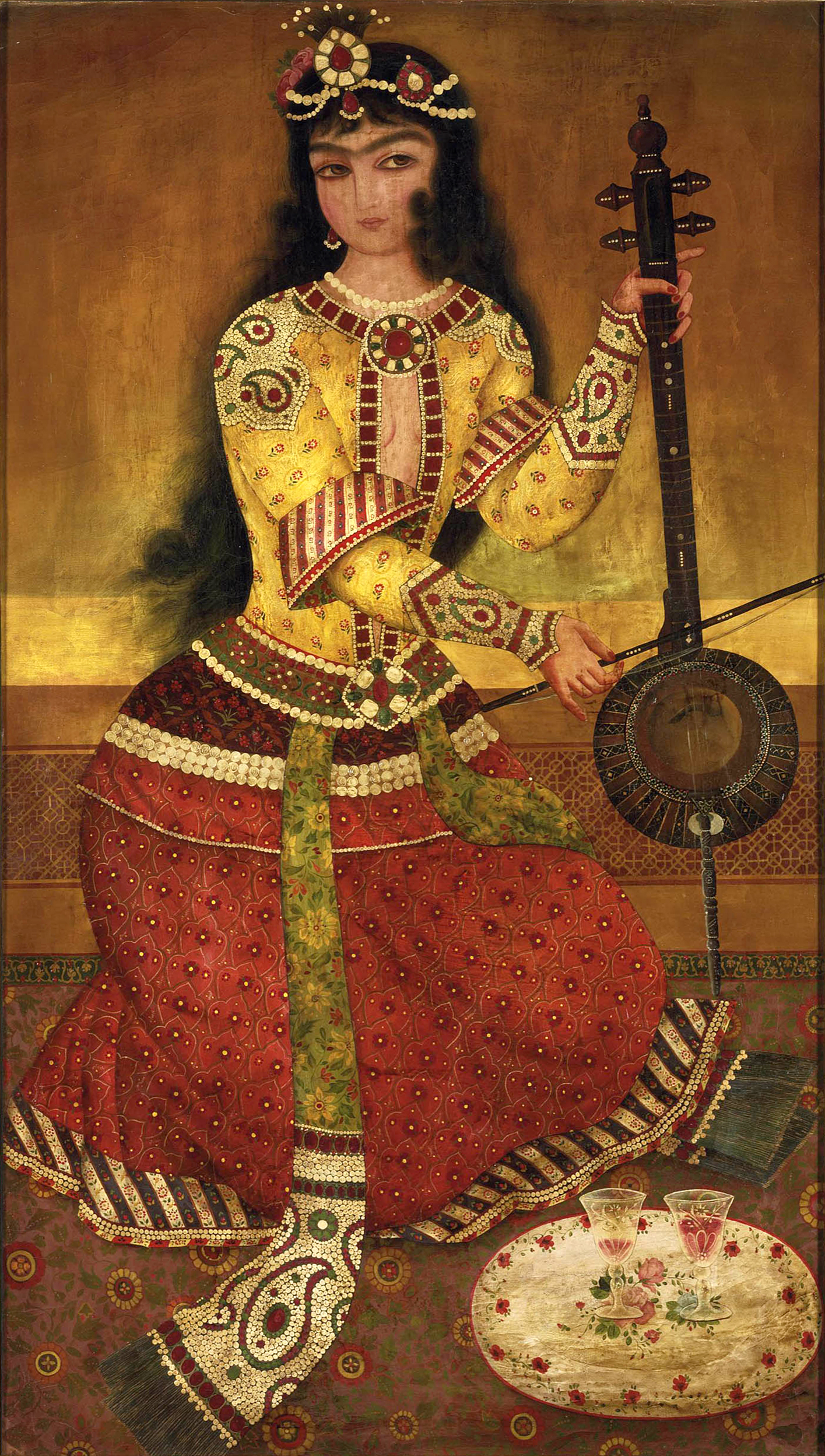
Playing a kamancheh

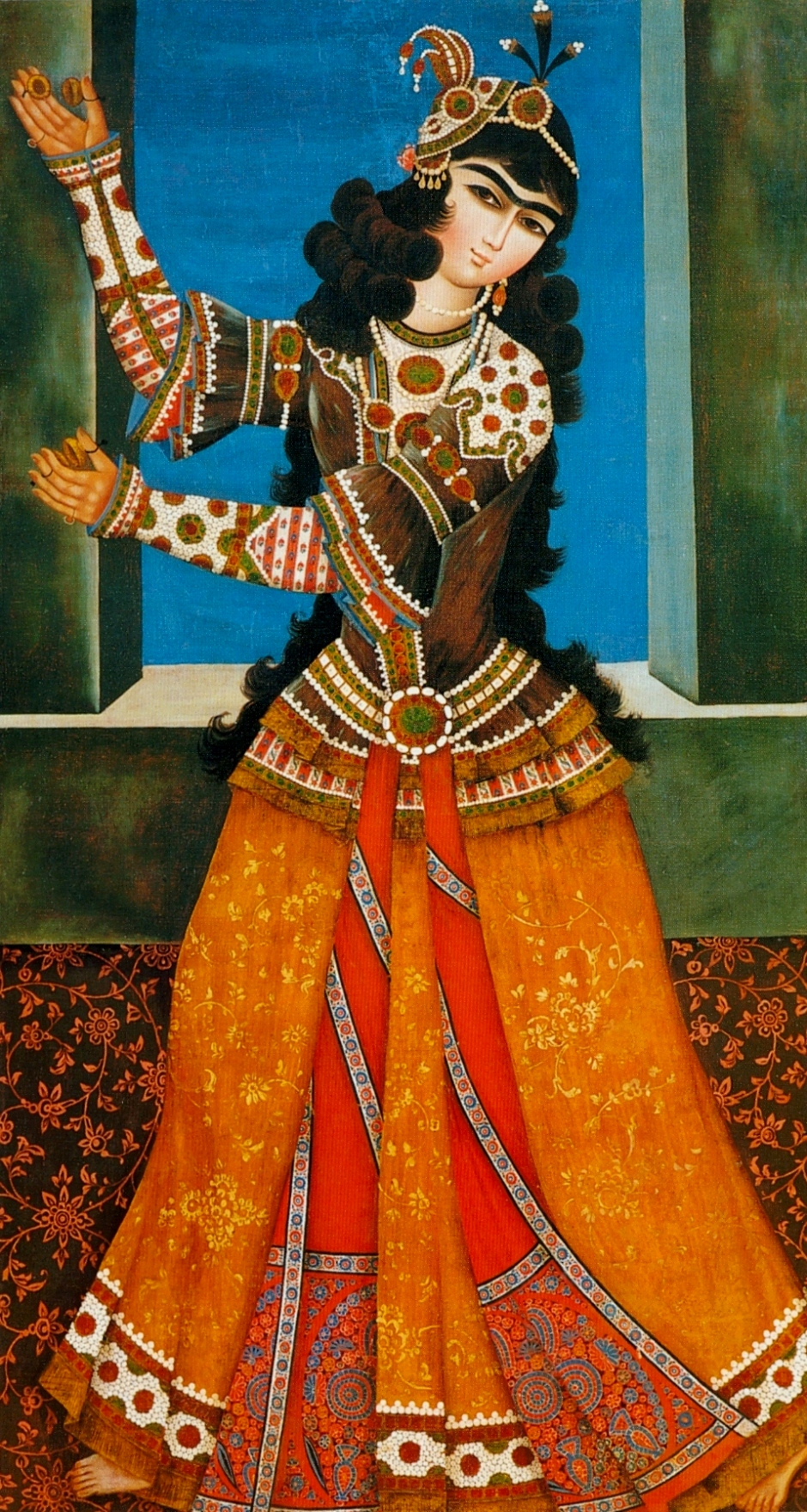
Dancing with castanets or zill

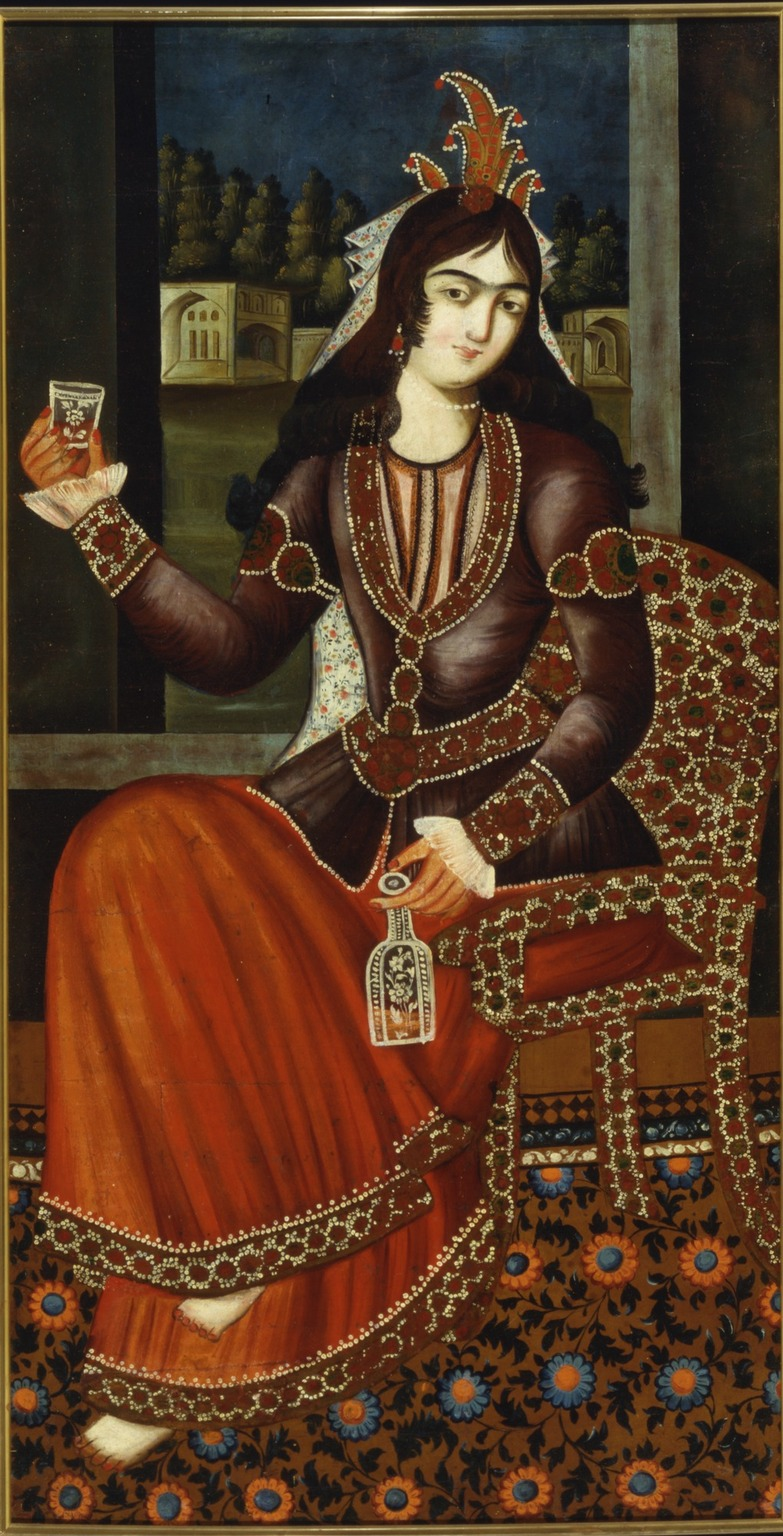
Woman holding a bottle and glass

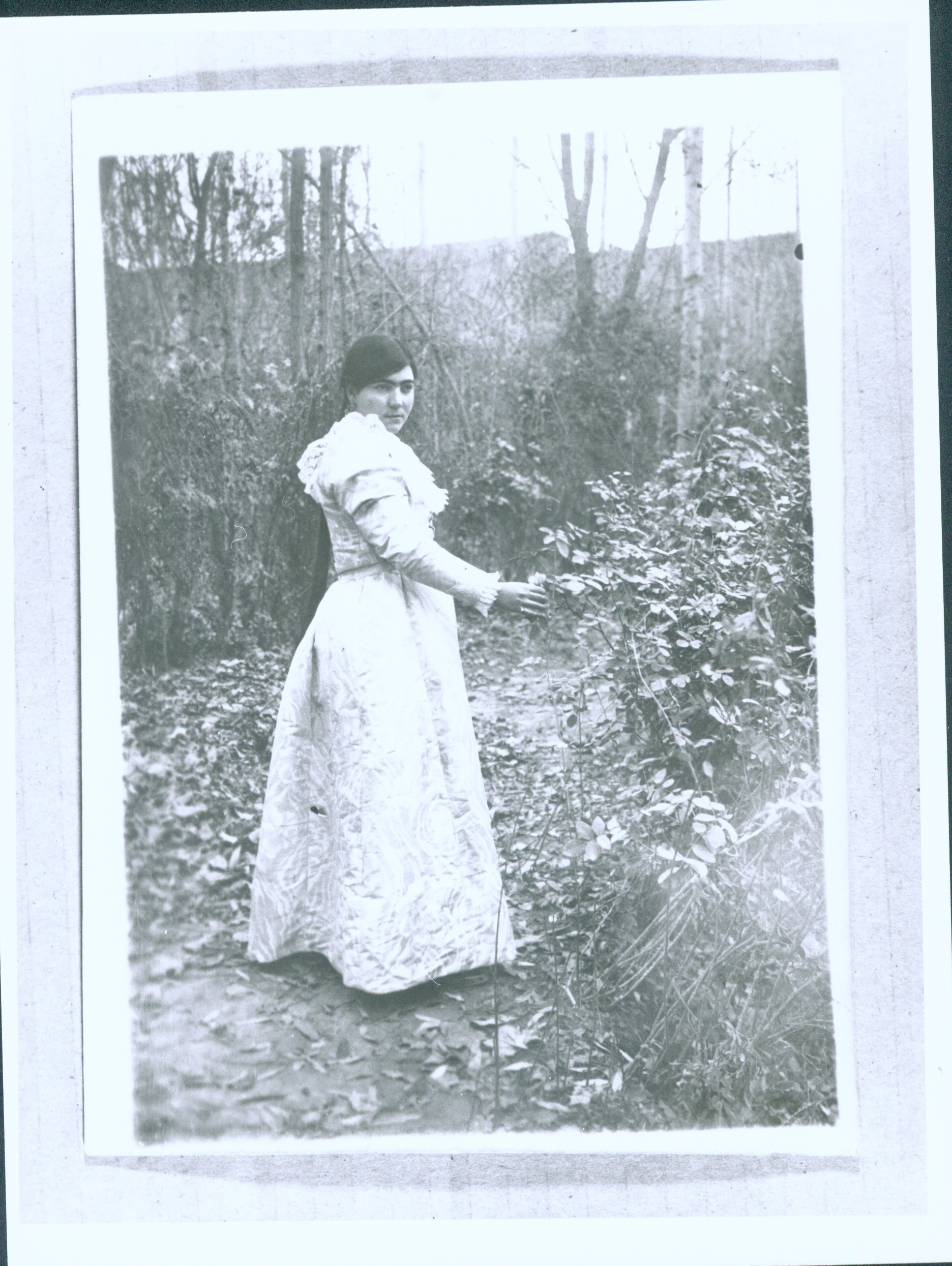

== See also ==
- Abbasid harem
- Safavid harem
- Ottoman Imperial Harem
- Golestan Palace
- Slavery in Iran
