= 1796 in Iran =

- Decades
- See also: Other events of 1796; Years in Iran

The following lists events that happened during 1796 in Qajar era.

== Incumbents ==
- Monarch: Agha Mohammad Khan Qajar

== Births ==
- November 25 – Abdollah Mirza Dara, Iranian poet and Qajar prince.
- ? – Fakhr Jahan Khanum, daughter of Fath ‘Ali Shah and calligrapher.
