= 1729 =

1729 in various calendars
- Gregorian calendar: 1729; MDCCXXIX
- Ab urbe condita: 2482
- Armenian calendar: 1178; ԹՎ ՌՃՀԸ
- Assyrian calendar: 6479
- Balinese saka calendar: 1650–1651
- Bengali calendar: 1135–1136
- Berber calendar: 2679
- British Regnal year: 2 Geo. 2 – 3 Geo. 2
- Buddhist calendar: 2273
- Burmese calendar: 1091
- Byzantine calendar: 7237–7238
- Chinese calendar: 戊申年 (Earth Monkey); 4426 or 4219 — to — 己酉年 (Earth Rooster); 4427 or 4220
- Coptic calendar: 1445–1446
- Discordian calendar: 2895
- Ethiopian calendar: 1721–1722
- Hebrew calendar: 5489–5490
- Hindu calendars
- Vikram Samvat: 1785–1786
- Shaka Samvat: 1650–1651
- Kali Yuga: 4829–4830
- Holocene calendar: 11729
- Igbo calendar: 729–730
- Iranian calendar: 1107–1108
- Islamic calendar: 1141–1142
- Japanese calendar: Kyōhō 14 (享保１４年)
- Javanese calendar: 1653–1654
- Julian calendar: Gregorian minus 11 days
- Korean calendar: 4062
- Minguo calendar: 183 before ROC 民前183年
- Nanakshahi calendar: 261
- Thai solar calendar: 2271–2272
- Tibetan calendar: ས་ཕོ་སྤྲེ་ལོ་ (male Earth-Monkey); 1855 or 1474 or 702 — to — ས་མོ་བྱ་ལོ་ (female Earth-Bird); 1856 or 1475 or 703

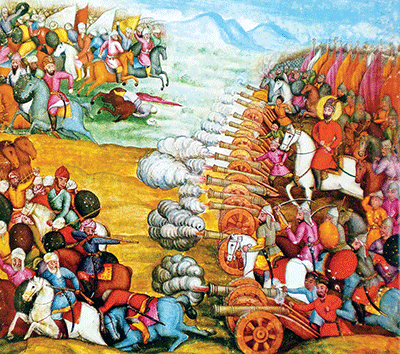
September 29: The seven-day Battle of Damghan starts.

1729 (MDCCXXIX) was a common year starting on Saturday of the Gregorian calendar and a common year starting on Wednesday of the Julian calendar, the 1729th year of the Common Era (CE) and Anno Domini (AD) designations, the 729th year of the 2nd millennium, the 29th year of the 18th century, and the 10th and last year of the 1720s decade. As of the start of 1729, the Gregorian calendar was 11 days ahead of the Julian calendar, which remained in localized use until 1923.

== Events ==
=== January–March ===
- January 8 – Frederick, the eldest son of King George II of Great Britain is made Prince of Wales at the age of 21, a few months after he comes to Britain for the first time after growing up in Hanover. For 23 years, Frederick is heir apparent to the British throne, but dies of a lung injury in 1751.
- January 19 – At the age of 14, Joseph (José), Prince of Brazil, son of King John V of Portugal, is married to the 10-year-old Princess Mariana Victoria of Spain, eldest daughter of King Philip V of Spain. In 1750, the couple become King Joseph I and Queen Consort Mariana Victoria of Spain.
- February 14 – King Philip V of Spain issues a royal cedula, directing an effort to offer incentives to families from the Canary Islands for settlements in New Spain north of the Rio Grande in the modern-day U.S. state of Texas (→ Canarian Americans).
- February 24 (February 13 O.S.) – In the city of Resht in Persia, Russian and Afghani leaders sign a peace treaty, with General Vasily Levashev for Russia and Muhammad Saidal Khan for Afghanistan.
- February 25 – James Oglethorpe, a member of the British House of Commons, begins service as the Chairman of the Gaols Committee to investigate the conditions of Britain's jails and prisons after the death in Fleet Prison of his friend, Robert Castell. The Oglethorpe Committee's report propels Oglethorpe to fame and leads to the beginning of British penal reforms.
- March 5 – Abdallah of Morocco becomes the new Sultan of Morocco upon the death of his half-brother, Abu'l Abbas Ahmad. Sultan Abdallah reigns for five years before being deposed for the first time, then returns to the throne five more times between 1736 and 1757.
- March 19 – John of Nepomuk (Jan Nepomucký) of Bohemia is canonized by Pope Benedict XIII more than 300 years after being tortured and drowned in 1393 by order of King Wenceslaus IV; John becomes patron saint of Roman Catholics in the Czech Republic.
- March 23 – Johann Sebastian Bach's First Köthen Funeral music premieres at St. Jakob, Köthen, in honor of the funeral of his former employer Leopold, Prince of Anhalt-Köthen. The next morning, Bach's funeral cantata Klagt, Kinder, klagt es aller Welt, BWV 244a premieres at St. Jakob, marking the same occasion.

=== April–June ===
- April 3 – Benjamin Franklin, aged 23, writes the essay "A Modest Enquiry Into the Nature and Necessity of Paper Currency" and later applies the economic principles to backing of paper money used in the United States.
- April 15 – Johann Sebastian Bach's St Matthew Passion, BWV 244b is performed again, at St. Thomas Church, Leipzig.
- April 26 – For the first time in its history, the British House of Commons is adjourned for lack of a quorum. On January 5, 1640, it had first fixed the number of members necessary — 40 — for parliamentary business to be transacted.
- May 8 – A fire breaks out inside the fully walled town of Haiger within the Holy Roman Empire (in the modern-day state of Hesse in Germany) and destroys all the buildings.
- May 12 – Six English pirates, including Mary Critchett, seize control of the sloop John and Elizabeth while being transported to America to complete their criminal sentences. They overpower their captors but are later captured in Chesapeake Bay by HMS Shoreham and hanged in August.
- May 17 – Caroline, Queen Consort becomes the first person to rule Great Britain as regent under the Regency Acts, beginning service as the acting monarch when her husband King George II departs Britain for Germany, where he is the Elector of Hanover. Caroline rules until George's return in October.
- June 1 – Diederik Durven becomes the new Governor-General of the Dutch East Indies (modern-day Indonesia) upon the death of Mattheus de Haan.
- June 8 – The Botanic Gardens of Pamplemousses, one of the most popular tourist attractions on the island republic of Mauritius, are started by Pierre Barmond, who sets aside thousands of acres for the purpose of preservation of the islands flora. The gardens come to occupy 97 square miles or 251 square kilometers.

=== July–September ===
- July 25 – Seven of the original eight Lords Proprietor of the Province of Carolina sell their shares back to the British crown. The 1710 division of the Province is made permanent and the area is reorganized into the Royal Colonies of North Carolina and South Carolina.
- July 27 – A fire that breaks out on this day in Constantinople destroys 12,000 houses and kills 7,000 inhabitants.
- July 30 – Baltimore, Maryland is founded.
- August 1 – The Comet of 1729, possibly the largest comet based on the absolute magnitude, on record, is discovered by Fr. Nicolas Sarrabat, a professor of mathematics at Marseille.
- September 29 – The Battle of Damghan begins as the Persian Safavid Army, commanded by General Nader Khan Afshar confronts a larger force of rebel Afghan troops commanded by the Emir Ashraf Hotak.

=== October–December ===
- October 5 – After seven days of battle, the Persians under Nader Khan Afshar make a daring attack through the center of the Emir Ashraf's battalions, killing 12,000 of the Afghans and forcing the remainder to flee, bringing an end to the Battle of Damghan.
- November 9 – The Treaty of Seville is signed between Great Britain, France, Spain and the Dutch Republic.
- November 29
  - The Natchez revolt, the worst Native American massacre to take place on Mississippi soil, occurs when Natchez people kill 138 Frenchmen, 35 French women, and 56 children at Fort Rosalie (near modern-day Natchez, Mississippi).
  - The first (wooden) Putney Bridge is completed, as the only fixed crossing of the River Thames between London Bridge and Kingston, England.
- December 2 – George Frideric Handel's famous opera Lotario is given its first performance, premiering at the King's Theatre in London.
- December 12 – Under the pretense of a peace offering, the Yazoo and Koroa warriors enter the French settlement at Fort St. Pierre (near modern-day Vicksburg, Mississippi) and kill most of the inhabitants.

=== Date unknown ===
- The third oldest settlement in Mississippi, Port Gibson, is founded by French settlers.
- Jonathan Swift (anonymously) publishes his satire A Modest Proposal.

== Births ==
- January 12
  - Lazzaro Spallanzani, Italian biologist (d. 1799)
  - Edmund Burke, Irish statesman and philosopher (d. 1797)

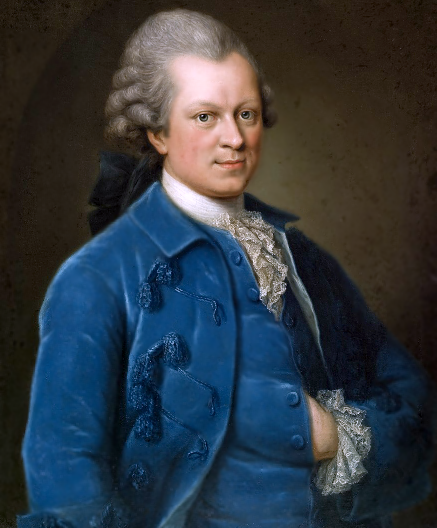
Gotthold Ephraim Lessing

- January 22 – Gotthold Ephraim Lessing, German author and philosopher (d. 1781)

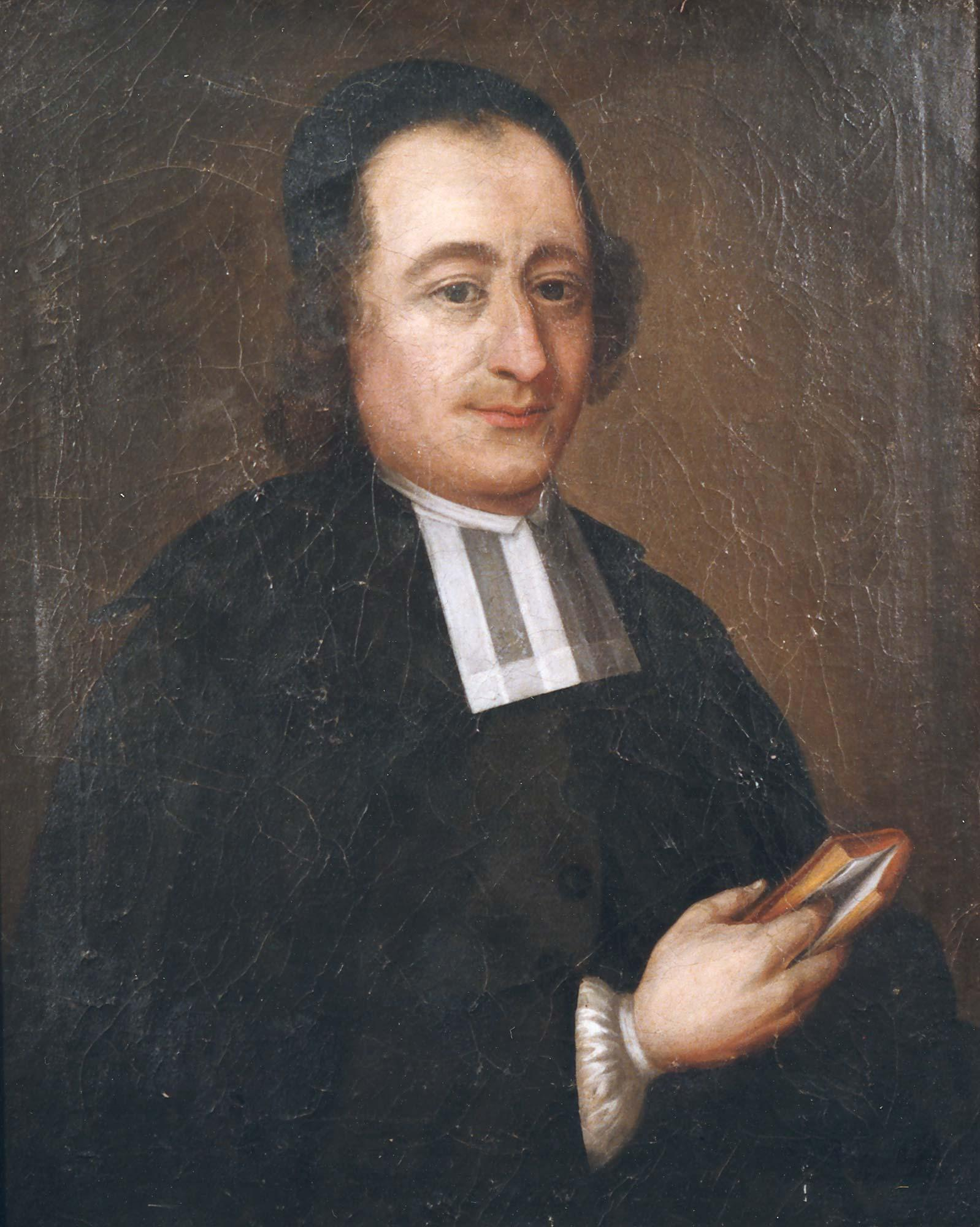
Anders Chydenius

- February 26 – Anders Chydenius, Finnish economist, liberal politician and Lutheran priest (d. 1803)

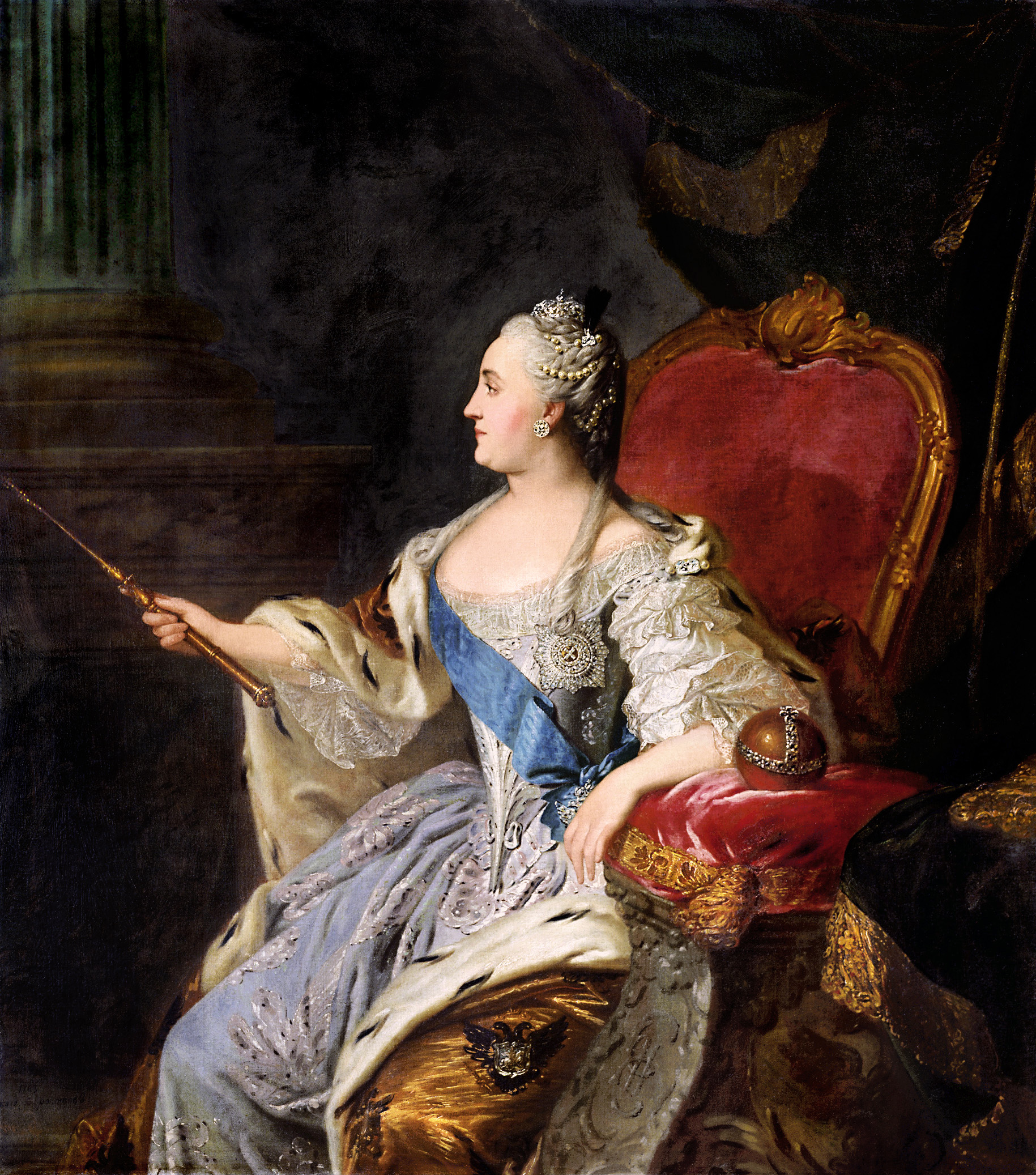
Catherine II of Russia

- May 2 – Catherine the Great, born Sophie of Anhalt-Zerbst, empress regnant of Russia (d. 1796)
- July 4 – George Leonard, American lawyer, jurist and politician (d. 1819)
- August 10 – William Howe, 5th Viscount Howe, British general (d. 1814)
- September 6 – Moses Mendelssohn, German-Jewish philosopher (d. 1786)
- September 15 – Mikiel'Ang Grima, Maltese surgeon (d. 1798)
- October 6 – Sarah Crosby, English Methodist preacher, the first female (d. 1804)
- November 17 – Maria Antonia Ferdinanda of Spain, Queen consort of Sardinia (d. 1785)
- November 21 – Josiah Bartlett, second signer of the United States Declaration of Independence (d. 1795)
- November 12 – Louis Antoine de Bougainville, French navigator and military commander (d. 1811)
- November 22 – Helena Dorothea von Schönberg, German industrialist (d. 1799)
- November 24 – Alexander Suvorov, Russian general (d. 1800)
- date unknown
  - David Barclay of Youngsbury, English merchant, businessman and banker (d. 1809)
  - Samuel Barrington, British admiral (d. 1800)
  - Mary Woffington, Irish socialite (d. 1811)

== Deaths ==
- January 11 – Thomas of Cori, Italian Friar Minor and preacher (b. 1655)
- January 19
  - William Congreve, English playwright (b. 1670)
  - Lorenzo Cozza, Italian Catholic cardinal (b. 1654)
- January 30 – Lothar Franz von Schönborn, Archbishop of Mainz (b. 1655)
- January 31 – Jacob Roggeveen, Dutch explorer (b. 1659)
- February 11 – Solomon Stoddard, pastor of the Congregationalist Church in Northampton, Massachusetts (b. 1643)
- February 17 – John Ernest IV, Duke of Saxe-Coburg-Saalfeld (b. 1658)
- March 2 – Francesco Bianchini, Italian philosopher, scientist (b. 1662)
- March 6 – Sir William Lowther, 1st Baronet, of Swillington, British politician (b. 1663)
- March 15 – Elisabeth Eleonore of Brunswick-Wolfenbüttel, Duchess consort of Saxe-Meiningen (b. 1658)
- March 18 – Michael Bernhard Valentini, German naturalist (b. 1657)
- March 21
  - John Law, Scottish-born economist (b. 1671)
  - Elżbieta Sieniawska, politically influential Polish magnate (b. 1669)
- March 26 – Simon de la Loubère, French diplomat (b. 1642)
- April 12 – Louis-Guillaume Pécour, French dancer and choreographer (b. 1653)
- May 4 – Louis-Antoine, Cardinal de Noailles, French bishop (b. 1651)

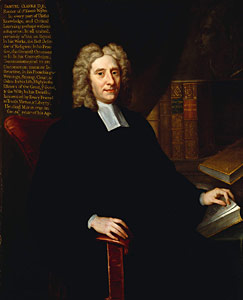
Samuel Clarke

- May 17 – Samuel Clarke, English philosopher (b. 1675)
- June 4 – Sir John Delaval, 3rd Baronet, English politician (b. 1654)
- June 12 – John Williams, American clergy (b. 1664)
- June 27 – Élisabeth Jacquet de La Guerre, French harpsichordist and composer (b. 1665)
- July 16 – Johann David Heinichen, German composer (b. 1683)
- July 30 – Thomas Tufton, 6th Earl of Thanet, British politician (b. 1644)
- August 5 – Thomas Newcomen, English inventor (b. 1663)
- August 31 – John Blackadder, Scottish soldier (b. 1664)
- September 1 – Richard Steele, Irish writer and politician (b. 1672)
- September 3 – Jean Hardouin, French scholar (b. 1646)
- September 7 – William Burnet, British Governor of New York and New Jersey (b. 1688)
- October 9 – Richard Blackmore, English physician and writer (b. 1654)
- October 16 – Johann Heinrich Ernesti, German philosopher, theologian (b. 1652)
- October 30 – William Conolly, Irish politician (b. 1662)
- November 8 – Joshua Oldfield, English Presbyterian divine (b. 1656)
- November 11 – John Benedict, Connecticut politician and deacon (b. 1649)
- December – Doamna Marica Brâncoveanu, princess consort of Wallachia (b. 1661)
- December 1 – Giacomo F. Maraldi, French-Italian astronomer (b. 1665)
- December 13 – Anthony Collins, English philosopher (b. 1676)
- December 22 – Michel Baron, French actor (b. 1653)
- December 26 – Honoré Tournély, French theologian (b. 1658)
- December 27 – Olimpia Giustiniani, Italian noblewoman (b. 1641)
- date unknown – Anastasia Markovych, Ukrainian Hetmana
