= 1799 in Iran =

- Decades
- See also: Other events of 1799; Years in Iran

The following lists events that happened during 1799 in Qajar era.

== Incumbents ==
- Monarch: Fath-Ali Shah Qajar
