= 1838 in Iran =

- Decades
- See also: Other events of 1838; Years in Iran

The following lists events that happened during 1838 in Qajar era.

== Incumbents ==
- Monarch: Mohammad Shah Qajar

== Births ==
- ? – Shokouh al-Saltaneh, Iranian Qajar princess.
