= Reza Qoli Khan Ardalan =

Iranian prince, governor of Kurdistan (1824–1864)

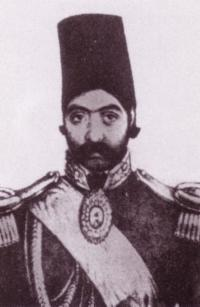
Depiction of Reza Qoli Khan Ardalan

Reza Qoli Khan Ardalan (Persian: رضاقلی‌خان اردلان; 1824–1864) was the penultimate Ardalan governor of Kurdistan from 1834 to 1848 at irregular intervals. He was the son and predecessor of Khosrow Khan III. His mother was Walia, the 21st daughter of Fath-Ali Shah Qajar (r. 1797–1834), the Qajar shah (king) of Iran.

Due to his young age, his mother initially managed the affairs of the realm. In an attempt to win over the public, Reza Qoli Khan lowered the tax. In 1835, Mohammad Shah Qajar (r. 1834–1848) sent him to help Bahram Mirza suppress the rebellion of Mohammad-Hossein Mirza, the governor of Kermanshah. In 1838, with the intention of strengthening Qajar authority in Kurdistan, Mohammad Shah gave his sister in marriage to Reza Qoli Khan.

Reza Qoli Khan died in Tehran in 1864.

== Sources ==
- Mozafari, Parastu (2023). "رضا‌قلی خان اردلان". The Great Islamic Encyclopaedia (in Persian).
