= Sonbol Baji =

Iranian royal consort

- Born: 1786; Rahbar, Kerman, Zand Iran
- Died: After 1845; Tehran, Qajar Iran
- Spouse: Fath-Ali Shah Qajar
- Issue: Fathollah Mirza (Shoa-os-Saltaneh); Fakhr Jahan Khanum (Fakhr-od-Dowleh); Hosn Jahan Khanum (Valieh); Tajli Begum Khanum
- Persian: سنبل‌ باجی
- Dynasty: Qajar (by marriage)
- Father: Askar

Sonbol Baji (Persian: سُنبُل‌ باجی), or Fatemeh Khanum (فاطمه خانم), was one of the consorts of Fath-Ali Shah Qajar (r. 1797–1834), the second shah of Qajar Iran. She was a daughter of some elites of Kerman. In 1793, during the conquest of Kerman, she was seven years old when Agha Mohammad Khan Qajar took her captive and engaged her to Fath-Ali Shah Qajar. She was a high-ranking lady from the distinguished families of Rahbar in Kerman and was considered one of the most influential wives of Fath-Ali Shah.

In 1794, she arrived in Tehran and married Fath-Ali Shah Qajar during the period when he was the crown prince.

== Early life ==
In 1786, Fatemeh Khanum was born in Rahbar, Kerman province, Iran. Her father was Askar, the shoemaker. She was beautiful and slim. Her childhood fell in the final years of the Zand dynasty, the beginnings of the Qajar dynasty, and a period of rivalry between the two. When she was seven years old, her hometown of Rahbar was besieged by Qajar forces and eventually surrendered to the Qajars. Fatemeh Khanum was then taken as a captive.

== Siege of Kerman ==
In 1793, Agha Mohammad Khan Qajar (r. 1789–1797) ordered Fath-Ali Khan to chase Lotf Ali Khan, the last ruler of the Zand dynasty. Lotf Ali Khan managed to escape to Kerman and seek refuge in the Rahbar fortress. Thus, Fath-Ali Khan attacked Kerman and put the fortress under heavy bombardment.

On 16 July 1793, after twenty days of resistance, the fortress was captured, and Lotf Ali Khan was finally arrested. Following this victory, Fath-Ali Khan, then 21 years old, demanded that he should marry a girl from this town. Among all the candidates, Fath-Ali Khan finally selected Fatemeh Khanum to marry.

== Marriage ==
In 1793, following her capture in the siege of Kerman, Fatemeh Khanum was engaged to Fath-Ali Khan. Fath-Ali Khan had a finicky nature in selecting his wives. However, he was pleased with Fatemeh due to her beautiful face and good manners.

Following the engagement, Fatemeh was rather sickly. So, she was not yet suitable for marriage. She was then treated by physicians and nurses for four years until she fully recovered and became ready for the wedding ceremony. Meanwhile, Fath-Ali Khan was busy with political and military affairs. After Lotf Ali Khan was arrested and killed and Zand dynasty was deposed, Fath-Ali Khan was promoted to crown prince and settled in Shiraz.

In 1797, the wedding ceremony was scheduled for Fatemeh Khanum and Crown Prince Fath-Ali Khan. On the night of the ceremony, which was in July 1797, the news broke that Agha Mohammad Shah was assassinated. In other words, the crown prince became the king. Consequently, Fath-Ali Shah Qajar interpreted the marriage to Fatemeh Khanum as a good omen and found special affection in her.

In July 1797, she finally married Fath-Ali Shah as a temporary wife (siqeh), and her name was subsequently changed to Sonbol Khanum.

== Fath-Ali Shah's court ==
Sonbol Khanum proved to be so pleasing and agreeable to Fath-Ali Shah Qajar that within a short time she rose to the highest ranks of ladyship and courtly status. Thereafter, she held an exceptional position among the royal ladies. Fath-Ali Shah referred to her as Khanom-e Motlaq (the Absolute Lady) and listened attentively to her counsel on arranging the affairs of the princes and princesses as well as matters concerning wives and close relatives, accepting her views with care.

One of her duties was to care for the Shah whether in the palace or during his trips. Due to her courtesy and kind heart, Sonbol Baji was highly respected in the Qajar harem; and the princes and princesses addressed her as Khanum.

After the birth of her first son, who from childhood was granted the title Shoa-os-Saltaneh by the Shah, she became one of the most powerful women at the court. Owing to her popularity among the people and her remarkable presence, she soon assumed the role of intermediary between the Shah and his subjects, demonstrating her skill in managing the affairs of the state and rising to a position among the key administrators of the realm.

She was involved not only in the affairs of the Shah’s harem but also took a direct role in the internal administration of the country and in political matters. Sonbol Baji acted as an intermediary for delivering the people’s petitions to the Shah, and Fath-Ali Shah took her advice regarding the princes and the members of the harem. When the food was being served, she was sitting by the Shah's side and was responsible for serving food to his wives and other royal family members at the table. Anyone who reached for another’s portion without permission would face her reprimand, and on several occasions, she even struck them with a serving spatula. Abdollah Mirza Dara referred to her as Homeira.

She transmitted to the Shah the petitions of the people of the city of Khamseh, which was under the rule of her son, Fathollah Mirza (Shoa-os-Saltaneh). She said to the Shah: “I do not wish anyone to be treated unfairly, then they complain against the Shah. Even if my own son were the source of injustice, he must be deposed.” Thus, she was very popular among the public because of her way of forwarding petitions from supplicants to the monarch.

Sonbol Baji’s brother, Ali Akbar Khan Rābari, was given the title “Khalu” (maternal uncle) at the court of Fath-Ali Shah. Fath-Ali Shah had granted her lands from the royal estates of Rābar, and even today, the clan in Rābar bearing the Kālūi family name are her descendants.

Her close relatives also gained important governmental positions and offices thanks to her influence and favor.

== Her servant became Shah's wife ==
One day, Prince Dara said to his father, Fath-Ali Shah Qajar, that he wrote an article in his book Qanoon (the Law) about enjoyable activities such as drinking water from a Qomi jar and mingling with a servant. To which the Shah replied that such an activity must be experienced. For this, the Shah eyed Fati Baji, who was Sonbol Khanum's servant, and had her prepared in a private room. Sonbol Khanum found out about the situation, entered the room, and yelled that she would not let that happen. However, the action was complete; and Fati Baji became pregnant with Fath-Ali Shah's daughter, Sarv Jahan Khanum. Later, Sarv Jahan Khanum married Agha Khan Mahallati (Aga Khan I).

== Mohammad Shah's court ==
In 1834, after the death of her husband, Fatemeh Khanum Sonbol Baji was among the women who remained in the harem of Mohammad Shah Qajar (r. 1834–1848). The new Shah highly respected her and other widows of Fath-Ali Shah, who stayed in the harem, and showed no discrimination between these ladies and other servants of his harem.

Mohammad Shah was holding greeting ceremonies on Fridays for all Qajar women to attend. In the ceremony, the women who had a petition were handing their requests to Sonbol Baji, mother of Shoa-os-Saltaneh. After collecting all the petitions, Sonbol Baji was submitting them to Mohammad Shah. She was then receiving the Shah's responses on the petitions and handing them over to Agha Bahram Khajeh, the court trustee. Finally, Agha Bahram Khajeh was submitting the Shah's orders to the grand vizier, Haji Mirza Aqasi.

== Children ==
Sonbol Baji had ten children with Fath-Ali Shah. Six of her children died prior to 1838. The other four include one son and three daughters.

Son:

- Fathollah Mirza (Shoa-os-Saltaneh); born in 1811

Daughters:

- Fakhr Jahan Khanum (Fakhr-od-Dowleh); married to Mirza Mohammad Khan (son of Hossein Qoli Khan), then divorced him
- Hosn Jahan Khanum (Valieh); married to Khosro Khan (Governor of Kordestan)
- Tajli Begum Khanum; married to Nasrollah Khan (son of Ebrahim Khan Zahir-od-Dowleh)

== Later life ==
In later years, Sonbol Baji traveled to Mecca for pilgrimage. Then, she visited the tomb of some Imams. Finally, she settled in Tehran and lived there until at least 1845.
