= Shokouh al-Saltaneh =

Iranian royal consort (d. 1892)

Shokouh ol-Saltaneh
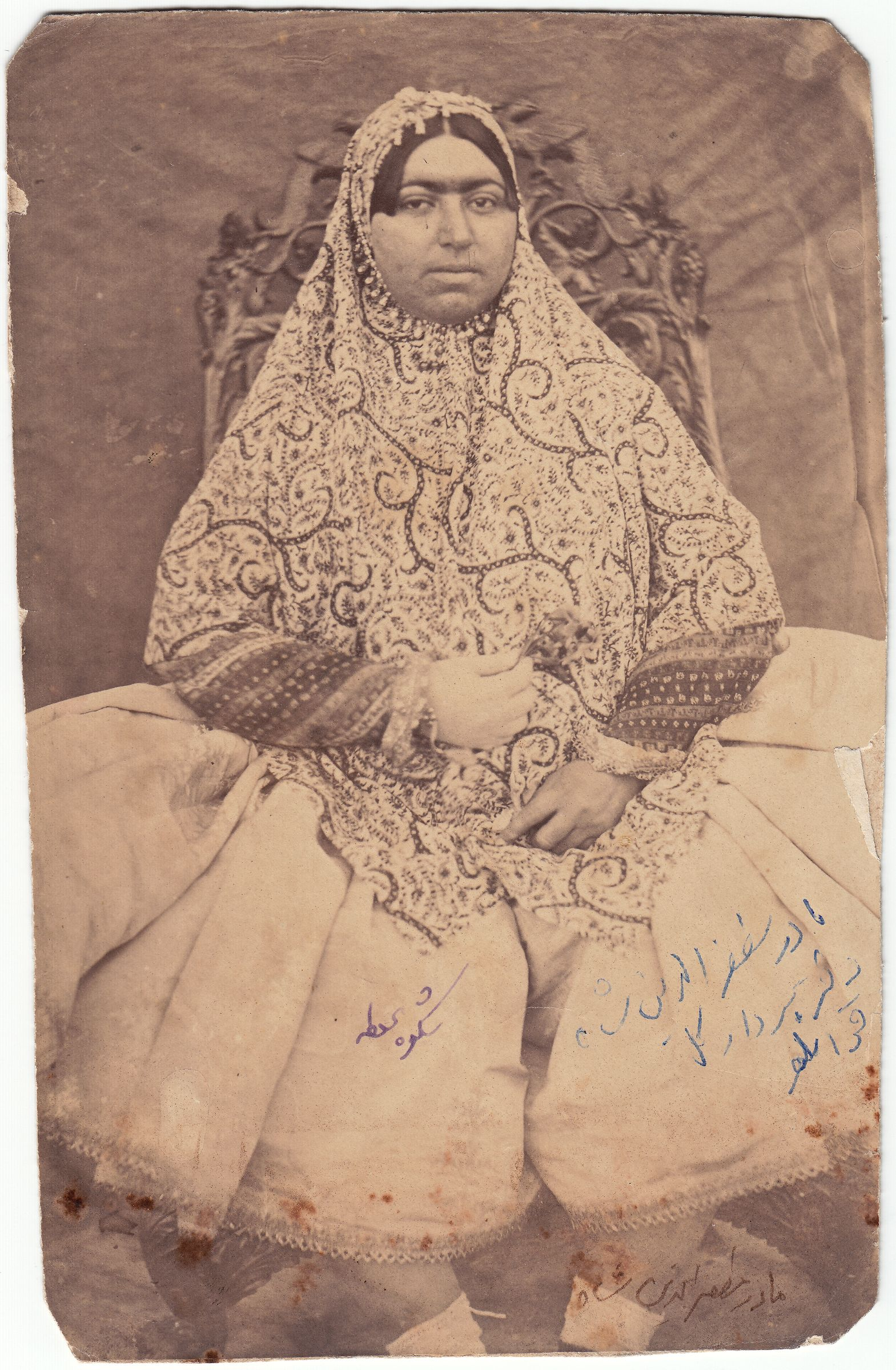

Senior consort of the Qajar shah (Mother of the Crown Prince)
- Tenure: 21 May 1862 – 11 May 1892
- Died: 11 May 1892; Golestan Palace, Tehran, Qajar Iran
- Spouse: Naser ed-Din Shah Qajar
- Issue: Mozaffar ad-Din Shah; Zinat od-Dawleh
- House: Qajar
- Father: Fathollah Mirza Shoa os-Saltaneh
- Mother: Shahrbanu Khanum

Shokouh al-Saltaneh (Persian: شکوه‌السلطنه; died on 11 May 1892) was a royal consort of Naser al-Din Shah Qajar of Iran (r. 1848–1896). Shokouh-ol-Saltaneh was one of the most influential and powerful women of the Qajar era.

Charles James Wilson writes about Shokouh-ol-Saltaneh:"The greatest and noblest of His Majesty's women, the noble Shokouh-ol-Saltaneh, is both the cousin of His Majesty the Shah and a descendant of the late, revered Fath Ali Shah."

== Biography ==
=== Family and marriage ===
Shokouh-ol-Saltaneh was born in 1254 AH (1838) to Fath-Allah Mirza Shoa' al-Saltaneh and Shahrbanoo Khanum, the daughter of Ibrahim Khan Zahir al-Dawlah, the ruler of Kerman. Shoa' al-Saltaneh was the thirty-sixth son of Fath Ali Shah and Fatimah Khanum Sunbul-Baji, one of the influential and favored wives at Fath Ali Shah's court.Shokouh-ol-Saltaneh was only twelve years old when, in 1268 AH (1852), she married the young Nasser al-Din Shah. She was his third official wife. Their marriage produced two children: the first was Mozzafar al-Din Mirza, born on the 14th of Jamadi al-Thani, 1269 AH (1853), and the second was a daughter named Zinat al-Dawlah, who died after nine months.

=== Reaching the position of mother of the crown prince ===
After the death of three of Nasser al-Din Shah's chosen crown princes and the necessity of appointing an heir, despite the Shah's personal reluctance, Mozzafar al-Din Mirza was selected as the crown prince in 1278 AH. This appointment brought Shokouh-ol-Saltaneh a special kind of authority. Dr. Jakob Pollak, the Austrian physician to Nasser al-Din Shah, mentioned in his memoirs titled Iran and Iranians that the Shah had a deep sense of disgust and hatred towards Shokouh-ol-Saltaneh and her father, Fath-Allah Mirza Shoa' al-Saltaneh, regarding Mozzafar al-Din Mirza's appointment. It is said that before Mozzafar al-Din Mirza's selection as crown prince, in 1274 AH, Mohammad Ali Mirza, the royal astrologer, gave a prediction to Shokouh-ol-Saltaneh's father, Fath-Allah Mirza, congratulating him on his grandson's future appointment as crown prince. While Shokouh-ol-Saltaneh was in the court of Nasser al-Din Shah in Tehran, she had special supervision over the affairs of the crown prince's court in Tabriz. When the court of the crown prince was taken over by individuals more focused on indulgence than governance, the senior figures of the Tabriz court wrote a petition to Shokouh-ol-Saltaneh, informing her of the situation. She, in turn, sent the exact petition to her husband, Nasser al-Din Shah, for him to address the matter.

=== Interference in the private life of the crown prince ===
Shokouh al-Saltaneh was deeply involved in the personal and marital matters of her son, Mozzafar al-Din Mirza, especially during the conflict between him and his wife, Taj al-Muluk (the daughter of Amir Kabir and Azad al-Dawlah, and the sister of Nasser al-Din Shah). Shokouh-ol-Saltaneh sought to influence Nasser al-Din Shah's decision to support the divorce between the couple. She became aware of a confidential letter from the Shah to the crown prince regarding the dispute with Taj al-Muluk and requested that Mirza Mohammad Ali Khan Ghafari, the messenger carrying this confidential letter, inform her about its contents. However, her request was initially rejected. In response, Shokouh-ol-Saltaneh wrote a letter to Mohammad Ali Khan Ghafari: "Moqarreb al-Khaqan Mirza Mohammad Ali Khan, regarding the decree, Qamar al-Saltaneh had written something to me. Very well, you should take the decree. I will write to Qamar al-Saltaneh, take a copy of the handwriting and read it. You should arrive soon in safety. When you reach His Majesty and present the decree, whatever His Majesty's decision is, inform me by telegram in a sealed form, so I can know if there will be reconciliation, divorce, or a return to Tehran. ... Please send me a telegram in a sealed form, so that I am not kept in the dark, and inform me in your words what is best for the crown prince on my behalf. Resolve this matter in a decisive manner. I swear by God, I have no peace of mind. I fear that woman's [Taj al-Muluk's] madness will lead to something disastrous, and the wise will be left bewildered... You all must be very careful in every matter, especially in regard to the crown prince's food, as that woman has no sense. Malabaji is also in the harem, so please make sure to speak to him to avoid any negligence. It is better to resolve this issue thoroughly..." This letter highlights Shokouh-ol-Saltaneh's intense involvement in trying to ensure that the dispute between her son and his wife was settled in a way that would be in her favor, showcasing her concern about Taj al-Muluk's influence and her attempt to control the situation.

Nasser al-Din Shah did not solely rely on the advice of Shokouh-ol-Saltaneh and Mozzafar al-Din Mirza. He assigned Mirza Hossein Khan Sepahsalar to investigate the matter. After reviewing the situation, Sepahsalar realized Shokouh-ol-Saltaneh’s persistent insistence on separating her son from Taj al-Muluk. He attempted to persuade Shokouh-ol-Saltaneh to reconsider and abandon her request for divorce through negotiations. In his letter to the Shah, Sepahsalar wrote: "I humbly offer my obeisance at the feet of Your Majesty, the most sacred and exalted, in regard to Em al-Khaqan, as it was decreed that if anything comes to my humble attention, I must present it at the royal feet. While the essence of every matter and the best course of action is in accordance with the radiant thoughts of Your Majesty, the beloved ruler of the realm, I, out of the utmost humility and submission, must dare to express that, in my poor opinion, reconciliation is far more beneficial than separation in all cases. This is especially true for those who belong to the royal family, and it is more appropriate for them to find a way to reconcile, if at all possible. Therefore, I humbly suggest that His Royal Highness the Crown Prince or the noble and esteemed Shokouh-ol-Saltaneh, may she be blessed, consider the possibility of reconciliation, and that the name of separation may never be uttered again.

However, Shokouh-ol-Saltaneh had no intention of reconciliation. Although she acknowledged that "it would be wrong to divorce while having three princes," she was seeking some form of punishment and policy for Em al-Khaqan (Taj al-Muluk). She was confident that as long as the crown prince and his wife remained in Tabriz, a divorce would not take place. Shokouh-ol-Saltaneh then requested that those close to the crown prince force him to express his longing for the Shah and write a petition to his mother, paving the way for his return to Tehran: "I kindly request that arrangements be made for the noble governor to come to Tehran this year, but the details should not be as extensive as before; they should be reduced. By God, the best interest of the crown prince is that he comes to Tehran this year. There are many things involved that I cannot write. In this confidential matter, I am writing to you two brothers, day and night whispering in his ear, so that he writes a letter to me stating that the Shah is surely requesting my presence this year; otherwise, I will come without permission. He should express great longing for the Shah, and I will send the same letter along with my petition to His Majesty. Of course, you must ensure that he will be willing to come..."

Shokouh-ol-Saltaneh's efforts were ultimately successful, and in 1293 AH (1876), Mozzafar al-Din Mirza, after coming to Tehran, divorced his wife, Taj al-Muluk (Em al-Khaqan). Azad al-Dawlah, the sister of Nasser al-Din Shah and mother of Taj al-Muluk, wrote a letter to Mirza Hossein Khan Sepahsalar complaining about Shokouh-ol-Saltaneh's actions. "According to what has been written from Tehran and what is being telegraphed, the noble Crown Prince and Shokouh-ol-Saltaneh have brought matters to such an extent of cruelty towards Em al-Khaqan that they are now planning to divorce her, and it has been reported that His Majesty the Shah has approved it. I do not complain about anyone else, and I consider my own misfortune to be worse than this... It seems that Shokouh-ol-Saltaneh's nephew is better than the Shah's nephew, and as a result, I will be disgraced before the world..."

Shokouh-ol-Saltaneh continued to care for the children of Mozzafar al-Din Mirza for some time. Even after the resolution of the family issue, the crown prince's oversight by his mother did not diminish. She remained influential in the affairs of the Tabriz court and continued to have a strong grip on matters related to his governance. Mozzafar al-Din Mirza, in turn, kept her informed about the matters of his rule, ensuring that she remained deeply involved in the political and administrative affairs of his reign.

=== Supporting the position of her son ===
In 1296 AH (1879), during the bread crisis in Tabriz, Mozzafar al-Din Mirza complained in a telegram about the difficulties he was facing due to the shortage of bread. In response, Shokouh-ol-Saltaneh urged him to remain patient and wrote: "Most of the provinces have been facing similar issues this year." Later, after Mozzafar al-Din Mirza's failure to suppress the rebellion of Sheikh Obaidullah, in 1298 AH (1881), Nasser al-Din Shah summoned him to Tehran as a form of punishment for his inadequacy. The crown prince was stationed at the Ilkhani Garden in Tehran. The Shah openly showed his disfavor toward his son, and rumors even circulated that the Shah might appoint his other son, Sultan Mas'ud Mirza Zill al-Sultan, as the new crown prince.Concerned about the future of her son's position, Shokouh-ol-Saltaneh made efforts to secure his place as heir. She arranged a meeting with Haj Sayah, who had just returned from a trip to Europe, and asked him to visit Mozzafar al-Din Mirza. After this meeting, Shokouh-ol-Saltaneh asked Haj Sayah to mediate and resolve the discord between the two brothers, with the aim of gaining Zill al-Sultan's support for Mozzafar al-Din Mirza. Haj Sayah succeeded in this mission, which greatly reassured Shokouh-ol-Saltaneh and helped secure her son's position.

=== Position in the harem ===
The residents of Shokouh-ol-Saltaneh's harem held significant influence due to her own authority. Ahmad Khan Khwaja, one of her trusted servants, and Ali Khan Khwaja, a powerful servant at Shokouh-ol-Saltaneh's court, were among those who held sway in her circle. In the court of Nasser al-Din Shah, only the most favored women had ministers, and Shokouh-ol-Saltaneh's minister was Haji Mohammad Khan. Her mukhtâr (administrator), Mirza Javad Khan Motamen al-Mulk, who represented Boroujerd in the First National Assembly, was highly influential and had complete control over the country's financial and internal affairs.Shokouh-ol-Saltaneh also had her own independent house in the Arg of Tehran, where she resided in the inner quarters. This independence and the fact that she had her own space in the royal citadel reflected her autonomy and power within the court, emphasizing her influential position in the royal harem.

=== Illness and death ===
With the outbreak of influenza in 1309 AH (1891), Shokouh-ol-Saltaneh contracted the disease. To treat her, six Iranian and foreign doctors were called upon. Among them was Dr. Fourier, who writes about the situation: "When the patient saw that we could not agree on the treatment, she resorted to Istikhara (a form of seeking divine guidance). Since the Iranian doctors allowed the Istikhara for treatment, I withdrew." Her illness lasted for three months, and despite the efforts of the doctors, she died at the age of 55 on the 14th of Shawwal, 1309 AH (1891), due to the severity of the illness. She did not live to see her son, Mozzafar al-Din Mirza, ascend the throne. Her illness lasted for three months, and despite the efforts of the doctors, she died at the age of 55 on the 14th of Shawwal, 1309 AH (1891), due to the severity of the illness. She did not live to see her son, Mozzafar al-Din Mirza, ascend the throne.Her body was later transferred to the holy shrines of Iraq (Atabat Aliyyah) in 1323 AH (1905), where it was laid to rest.

=== Her position in the eyes of the shah ===
Although Shokouh-ol-Saltaneh did not enjoy the same level of affection from the Shah as Anis al-Dawlah and Amin al-Aqdas, she still held a unique position in the royal household. Her status was notable, as evidenced by the fact that during Nasser al-Din Shah's third trip to Europe, he sent a photograph of himself exclusively to Shokouh-ol-Saltaneh, indicating her special place in his regard. To prevent any tension or resentment among the Shah's wives, Amin al-Aqdas took a diplomatic step and sent two additional photographs of the Shah to Galin Khanom and Taj al-Dawlah, who, like Shokouh-ol-Saltaneh, were among the Shah's official wives and descendants of Fath Ali Shah. This act shows not only Shokouh-ol-Saltaneh's unique position but also the delicate balance of power and emotions among the royal consorts, and how even small gestures were used to maintain harmony within the harem.
