= Fathollah Mirza Shoa os-Saltaneh =

Qajar prince (1811–1869)

Fathollah Mirza
- Shoa os-Saltaneh
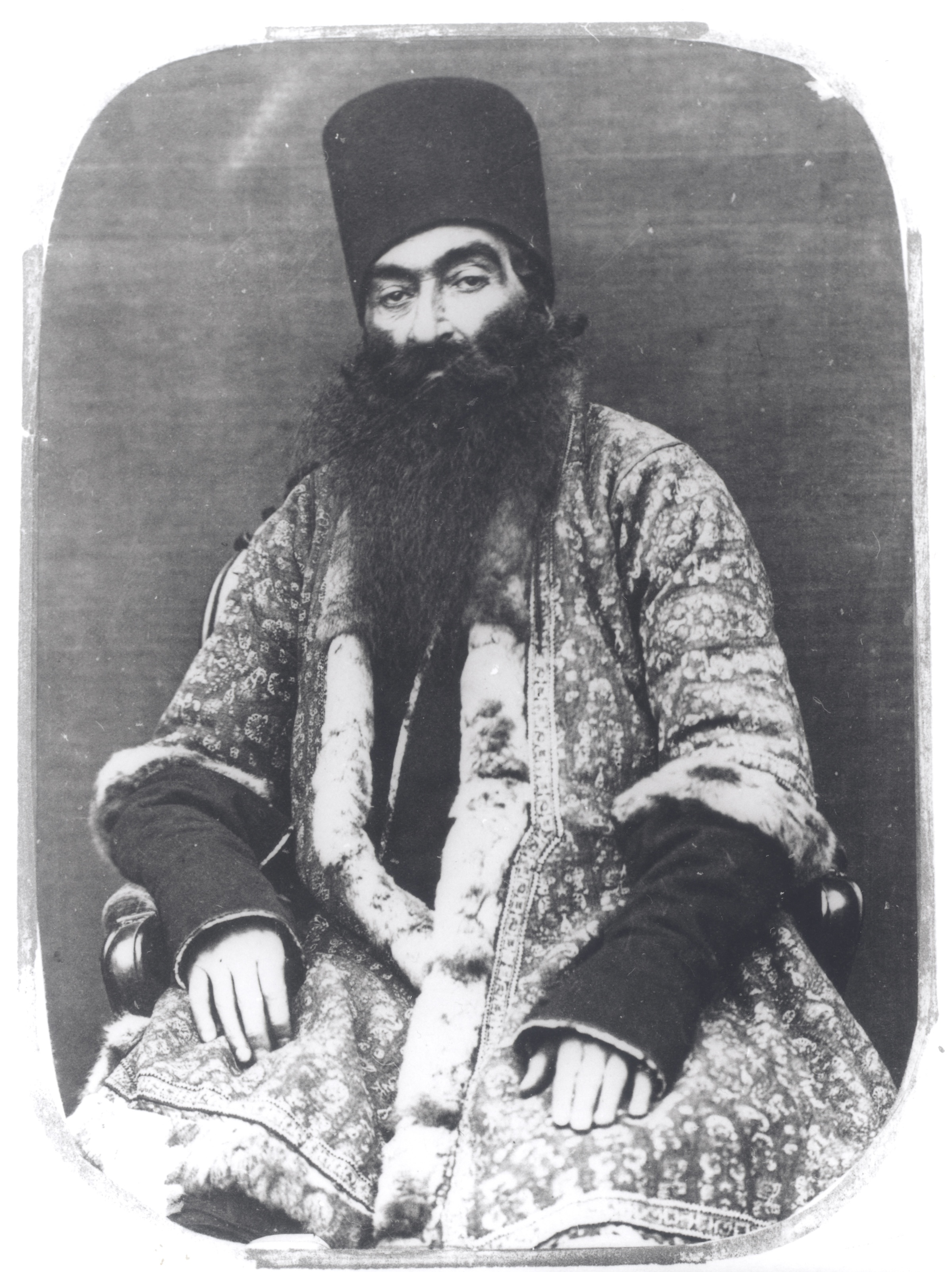
- Portrait, Golestan Palace library

Governor of Zanjan
- Tenure: 1827–1836
- Monarchs: Fath-Ali Shah Qajar; Mohammad Shah Qajar
- Predecessor: Abdollah Mirza Dara

Governor of Khamseh
- Tenure: before 1834–1836
- Monarchs: Fath-Ali Shah; Mohammad Shah

Governor of Hamedan
- Tenure: 1836–1839
- Monarch: Mohammad Shah
- Successor: Khanlar Mirza

Governor of Kashan
- Tenure: 1839–1841
- Monarch: Mohammad Shah
- Predecessor: Mostafa Qoli Khan Semnani
- Successor: Ali Khan-Salar Khan
- Born: 30 July 1811; Tehran, Qajar Iran
- Died: 1869 (aged 57–58); Tehran, Qajar Iran
- Spouse: Shahrbanu Khanum
- Issue: Shokouh os-Saltaneh; Noor od-Dahr Mirza; Ibrahim Mirza
- Dynasty: Qajar
- Father: Fath-Ali Shah Qajar
- Mother: Sonbol Baji
- Religion: Twelver Shia Islam

Fathollah Mirza Shoa os-Saltaneh (Persian: فتح‌الله میرزا شعاع‌السلطنه; 30 July 1811 – 1869) was the thirty-fifth son of Fath-Ali Shah Qajar and the father of Shokouh al-Saltaneh, the mother of Mozaffar ad-Din Shah Qajar. He was the governor of Khamseh, Zanjan, Hamedan, and Kashan.

== Early life ==
Fathollah Mirza was born to Fath-Ali Shah Qajar and Sonbol Baji on 30 July 1811 in Tehran.

== Governorship ==
He was the governor of Khamseh and Zanjan during the reigns of Fath-Ali Shah (r. 1797–1834) and Mohammad Shah Qajar (r. 1834–1848) and that of Hamedan and Kashan during the reign of Mohammad Shah.

== Marriage and Children ==
He married Shahrbanu Khanum, the daughter of Ebrahim Khan Zahir od-Dowleh, and had three children:

- Shokouh os-Saltaneh
- Noor od-Dahr Mirza
- Ibrahim Mirza

== Death ==
Fathollah Mirza died in 1869.

== Sources ==
- Azodi, Ahmad Mirza Azdo-Dowleh (1887). تاریخ عضدی [Azodi History] (in Persian). Maharat.
- Bamdad, Mehdi (1978). شرح حال رجال ایران در قرن ۱۲ و ۱۳ و ۱۴ هجری [Biographies of Iranian Elites in 17-20th Centuries] (in Persian). Zavvar.
- Etemad os-Saltaneh, Mohammad Hasan Khan (1889). خیرات حسان [Khayrat-e Hesan (Good Women)] (in Persian).
- Khavari, Mirza Fazlollah Shirazi (1845). Tarikh Zol Qarnein (تاریخ ذوالقرنین) (in Persian). Ministry of Culture and Islamic Guidance of Iran.
- Sepehr, Mohammad Taqi Lesanolmolk (1855). ناسخ التواریخ تاریخ قاجاریه [Qajar History] (in Persian). Asatir.
