= Fakhr Jahan Khanum =

Daughter of Fath-Ali Shah Qajar

- Princess
- Born: 1798; Tehran, Qajar Iran
- Died: 1858 (aged 59–60); Tehran, Qajar Iran
- Spouse: Mirza Mohammad Khan (m. 1810; div. 1819)
- Issue: No issues
- Persian language: فخر جهان خانم (فخرالدوله)
- Dynasty: Qajar
- Father: Fath-Ali Shah Qajar
- Mother: Sonbol Baji
- Style: Nail art; Persian calligraphy; Nail-style drawing
- Children: Sahebqaran Mirza (Eskandar Mirza); from adoption; Soltan Hossein Mirza; under guardianship
- Relatives: Hosn Jahan Khanum (Valieh); sister

Fakhr Jahan Khanum (Persian: فخر جهان خانم; 1798 – 1858), titled Fakhr-od-Dowleh (Persian: فخرالدوله; lit. pride of the state), was an Iranian princess of the Qajar dynasty. She was a daughter of Fath-Ali Shah Qajar (r. 1797–1834) by his wife Sonbol Baji. She was an artist with a specialty in nail-style drawings including Persian calligraphy, full body portraits, and nature. By the order of her father, she married her cousin and lived with him for nine years. However, she expressed resistance by remaining a virgin and finally separated and never married again. She raised two of her half-brothers after adopting one and becoming the guardian of the other. She was influential in saving her half-brother Ali Mirza Zel-os-Soltan from being killed by Mohammad Shah Qajar after Ali Mirza declared himself the shah and was then forcibly removed and imprisoned.

== Early life ==
Fakhr Jahan Khanum was born in 1798 in Tehran. Her parents were Fath-Ali Shah Qajar (r. 1797–1834) and Sonbol Baji (born 1786; died after 1845), who were engaged in 1793 and married in July 1797. In July 1797 at their wedding ceremony in Shiraz, her father, then Fath-Ali Khan, the crown prince of Qajar Iran, received the news of the assassination of his uncle, Agha Mohammad Shah. Later, he moved to Tehran and proceeded to become the shah of Iran. Her mother, Fatemeh Khanum, also known as Sonbol Baji, was a daughter of Askar, a shoemaker from Kerman. At their wedding, Fath-Ali Khan was 25 and Sonbol Baji was 11 years old.

== Marriage and children ==
=== First and only spouse ===
Fakhr Jahan Khanum would not marry a man who did not match her. By the order of her father, she was forced to marry her cousin Mirza Mohammad Khan, a son of Hossein Qoli Khan Qajar (Fath-Ali Shah's brother). However, their temperaments proved incompatible; and after nine years, she divorced Mirza Mohammad Khan, while remaining virgin. She never married again.

=== Adoption ===
Alagoz Khanum of Bastam was one of Fath-Ali Shah's consorts, who was also the head servant tasked to manage golden and silver hookahs, coffee cups, and tea sets in his haram at the office of Sonbol Baji. Alagoz Khanum died leaving behind her infant son Sahebqaran Mirza (born 1819), also known as Eskandar Mirza. Following this event, Sonbol Baji arranged the process of giving the infant to her daughter Fakhr Jahan Khanum for adoption. Consequently, Fakhr Jahan Khanum adopted Sahebqaran Mirza and raised him. This made Sahebqaran Mirza even closer to his father Fath-Ali Shah; and later the Shah appointed him as a cannon commander.

=== Guardianship ===
Alagoz Khanum Qarabaqi of Georgian descent from Tbilisi was a servant of Aghabaji and a consort of Fath-Ali Shah. This Alagoz Khanum, which is a different person from the Alagoz Khanum of Bastam, and the Shah had a son named Soltan Hossein Mirza (1830 – 1848). She died young leaving behind her son. Fakhr-od-Dowleh became the guardian of Soltan Hossein Mirza. Thus, he was raised by his half-sister. In 1848, Soltan Hossein Mirza died in a fire that was caused by an attack on the camp of Mehdi Qoli Mirza, the commander of the government forces. The attack was conducted at night by Molla Hossein Boshruyeh and the Babis of the Sheikh Tabarsi fort.

=== Children ===
- From marriage to Mirza Mohammad Khan, a son of Hossein Qoli Khan Qajar (Fath-Ali Shah's brother): divorced childless
- From adoption:
  - Sahebqaran Mirza (Eskandar Mirza; born 1819); a son of Alagoz Khanum of Bastam and Fath-Ali Shah; Fakhr Jahan Khanum adopted Sahebqaran Mirza following the death of Alagoz Khanum; Sahebqaran Mirza married Galin Khanum, a daughter of Ebrahim Khan Davallu Qajar.
- Under guardianship:
  - Soltan Hossein Mirza (1830 – 1848); a son of Alagoz Khanum Qarabaqi of Georgian descent from Tbilisi and Fath-Ali Shah; Fakhr Jahan Khanum became the guardian of Soltan Hossein Mirza following the death of Alagoz Khanum Qarabaqi.

== Activities ==
=== Art ===
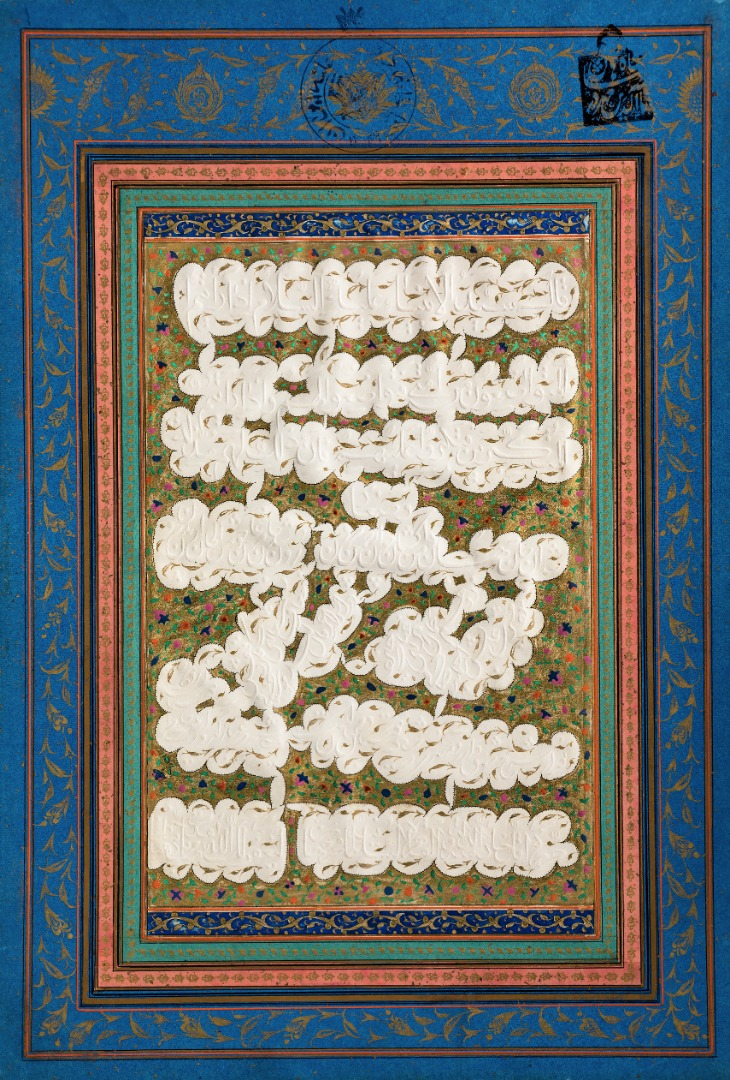
Nail art by Fakhr Jahan Khanum in the Qajar era

Fakhr Jahan Khanum had a talent in painting and calligraphy, especially in nail arts, i.e., a form of drawing on paper using only one's finger nails. Among her artworks are a number of nail-style scripts in Persian calligraphy, Nastaliq, Shekasteh, Taliq script, and Naskh; a full body nail-style portrait of Mohammad Shah Qajar (r. 1834–1848) in 1844; and a number of nail-style pictures of flowers and plants.

=== Soil for Fath-Ali Shah's mausoleum ===
In 1833, one year prior to his death, Fath-Ali Shah ordered the construction of his mausoleum in Qom. For this project, he ordered Fakhr-od-Dowleh, who had planned to visit Karbala, to bring from Karbala 50 mann (150 kg) of soil from Husayn ibn Ali's mausoleum and lay the soil in his mausoleum.

=== Saving the life of a self-declared shah ===
In 1834 after Fath-Ali Shah's death, Ali Mirza Zel-os-Soltan laid claim to the throne in Tehran and crowned himself under the name Ali Shah. Soon afterward, through the strategy of Qa'em-Maqam Farahani, Tehran was taken and Zel-os-Soltan was imprisoned. Mohammad Mirza, the legitimate heir, was then crowned as Mohammad Shah. The Shah initially planned to kill his uncle Zel-os-Soltan or blind him at the very least. However, Fakhr Jahan Khanum, together with a number of daughters of Fath-Ali Shah and Abbas Mirza, visited Mohammad Shah and requested for forgiveness of Zel-os-Soltan. They were able to convince the Shah not to kill him. Instead, the Shah sent Zel-os-Soltan to exile in Hamedan, then to Maragheh, and finally to the Ardebil fort. He managed to escape from Ardebil to Russia, Turkey, and finally to Baghdad, where he permanently resided until his death in Karbala in 1855. Therefore, Fakhr Jahan Khanum was influential in saving her half-brother's life.

=== Pilgrimage ===
After 1834, Fakhr Jahan Khanum traveled to Mecca for pilgrimage. She showed generosity toward the Pasha's and other residents. On her way, she also gave donations to a number of people.

=== Palace life ===
Due to having a strong bond with her father, Fakhr-od-Dowleh was granted a private residence separate from Fath-Ali Shah's palace. She was also assigned a special room in Fath-Ali Shah's private palace, in which all princes and princesses and the shah were gathering for lunch and dinner.

Following her separation, she first took up residence in the Sarvestan Courtyard, a building in the Golestan Palace. Later, the houses within the royal citadel, originally the residence of Fath-Ali Shah, were granted to her. Fakhr-od-Dowleh had her own attendants, tent quarters, and private stables. The districts of Joshaqan and Eshtehard were assigned to her as fiefs, and Fath-Ali Shah built Niavaran Palace for her. At first, several princes resided in Niavaran under her supervision. After the last Russo-Persian War, when Fath-Ali Shah paused his summer trips to the plain of Soltaniyeh, he instead spent each summer in Niavaran as Fakhr-od-Dowleh's guest, accompanied by many members of the royal harem and princes. She had golden cooking cauldrons and utensils, and during her father's stays, she personally prepared his meals in a golden pot. She was a generous princess who hosted lavish banquets; as a result, she fell into debt toward the end of her life.

Sepehr, the historian, wrote that: "She is noble and exalted in rank, and her presence is the gathering place of the great people."

== Death ==
She died in Tehran in 1858.

== Sources ==
- Azodi, Ahmad Mirza Azdo-Dowleh (1887). تاریخ عضدی [Azodi History] (in Persian). Maharat.
- Bamdad, Mehdi (1978). شرح حال رجال ایران در قرن ۱۲ و ۱۳ و ۱۴ هجری [Biographies of Iranian Elites in 17-20th Centuries] (in Persian). Zavvar.
- Divanbeigi Shirazi, Seyyed Ahmad; Navaee, Abdolhossein (1987). حدیقة الشعراء (در شرح حال و آثار شاعران دوره قاجاریه از سال 1200 تا 1300 هجری قمری) [Garden of Poets (Biographies of Poets in the Qajar era from 1785 to 1883)] (in Persian). Zarrin.
- Farrokhzad, Pouran (1999). دانشنامه زنان فرهنگساز ایران و جهان [Encyclopedia of Culture-Making Women in Iran and in the World] (in Persian). Zaryab.
- Khavari, Mirza Fazlollah Shirazi (1845). Tarikh Zol Qarnein (تاریخ ذوالقرنین) (in Persian). Ministry of Culture and Islamic Guidance of Iran.
- Nashat, Guity; Beck, Lois (2004). Women in Iran from 1800 to the Islamic Republic. University of Illinois Press. ISBN 9780252029370.
- Qajar, Mahmoud Mirza; Qajar, Malek Iraj Mirza; Mohaddes, Mir Hashem (2015). گلشن محمود (در شرح احوال تعدادی از پسران و نوادگان فتحعلی شاه) به ضمیمه تاریخ ملکزادگان تخمه خاقان [Garden of Mahmoud (Biographies of some of the sons and descendants of Fath-Ali Shah) plus history of the children of Khaqan] (in Persian). Safir Ardehal (سفیر اردهال).
- Qajarwomen. "Qajarwomen Webpage". Qajarwomen.org.
- Sepehr, Mohammad Taqi Lesanolmolk (1855). ناسخ التواریخ تاریخ قاجاریه [Qajar History] (in Persian). Asatir.
