= Mikiel'Ang Grima =

- Born: 15 September 1729
- Died: 25 August 1798 (aged 68)
- Education: Holy Infirmary, Valletta; University of Pisa
- Years active: 1758–1797
- Medical career
- Profession: Surgeon
- Institutions: Holy Infirmary, Valletta; Hospital of Santa Maria Nuova
- Sub-specialties: Traumatic Surgery

Mikiel'Ang Grima (also known as Michel'Angelo Grima) (15 September 1729 – 25 August 1798) was a Maltese surgeon during the times of the Knights of Malta. He was particularly adept at traumatic surgery. Grima was able to open bladders and remove stones in only two and a half minutes.

== Biography ==
=== Early life ===
Grima was born in about 1729. At age twelve he began his studies about surgery in the Holy Infirmary in Valletta. He continued his medical studies abroad in the University of Pisa and Florence. He obtained a doctorate in medicine and philosophy in 1754. Grima remained in Florence and worked at the Hospital of Santa Maria Nuova. Where he carried out experiments on live dogs, and published his findings in a book entitled Del Nuovo Metodo di Cucire gl'Intestini. Grima left Florence as an approved surgeon in 1758 and, by the permission of the Order arrived in Paris in 1760 and served as a medic with the French troops during the Seven Years' War. Where he wrote his second book about his work on the wounded soldiers, entitled Della Medicina Traumatica. This book was published in 1773.

=== Return to Malta ===
Grima returned to Malta in 1763 and was immediately given the post of Chief Surgeon at the Holy Infirmary. Two years later he started lecturing on anatomy and surgery, and became holder of the Chair of Anatomy and Surgery. In 1771 he was nominated as lecturer in surgery and anatomy in two Italian colleges, yet he remained in Malta. Later on in 1781 Grima published a textbook, the Istituzioni d'Anatomia, to complement his lectures. Medical students from all over Europe travelled to Malta to learn under his tutorage. In 1783, Grandmaster Emmanuel de Rohan-Polduc commissioned him to test the legitimacy of the remedial measures of Mesmer's method of animal magnetism. Grima retired in 1797 and died on 25 August 1798. He is buried in the Church of the Minor Observants of St. Francis in Valletta.
