= Hosn Jahan Khanum =

Iranian princess, ruler of Kurdistan (d. 1861/62)

Hosn Jahan Khanom
- Valiyeh
- Died: 1861/62
- Spouse: Khosrow Khan
- Issue: Reza Qoli Khan Ardalan
- Dynasty: Qajar
- Father: Fath-Ali Shah Qajar
- Mother: Sonbol Baji

Hosn Jahan Khanom (Persian: حسن جهان خانم), also known as Valiyeh (Persian: والیه, lit. 'female governor'), was the 21st daughter of Fath-Ali Shah Qajar from Sonbol Baji, a beloved and respected consort of the shah. She was the mother of Reza Qoli Khan Ardalan.

During the Qajar era, there were few signs of women holding power, and positions of authority were largely occupied by men. However, during the reign of Fath-Ali Shah, Hosn Jahan Khanom ruled Kurdistan for a time with notable authority. She was a cultivated and refined woman, gifted with artistic taste and a natural talent for politics and statecraft.

== Life ==
In Tarikh-e Ozodi, Ozod al-Dowleh describes Hosn Jahan Khanom as follows: "In beauty of appearance, gentleness of spirit, generosity of hand, and eloquence of speech, she had few equals." She was one of the daughters particularly close to the Shah and was always permitted to attend and sit during her father’s Friday court ceremonies.

In 1230 AH (c. 1815 CE), Amanollah Khan Ardalan, after suppressing internal unrest in Kurdistan and consolidating his authority in the region, traveled to Tehran with numerous gifts to seek an alliance with the royal family. He proposed marriage between Hosn Jahan Khanom and his son, Khosrow Khan. Fath-Ali Shah accepted the proposal.

According to Tarikh-e Ozodi, quoting Amanollah Khan Ardalan, his reason for requesting the Shah’s daughter in marriage was this: “I wish, through a special bond with the Shah of Iran, to prevent neighboring powers from extending their hands toward my hereditary domain and the seat of my authority."

Two years later, after preparing the wedding arrangements, Amanollah Khan Ardalan traveled to Tehran with his relatives and dignitaries to escort the bride. Following a month of celebrations and festivities, Hosn Jahan Khanom departed for Kurdistan.

The expenses of the wedding were considerable. In Tarikh-e Ardalan, it is recorded that 100,000 tomans were spent on the ceremony and its necessities, including 40,000 tomans specifically for adornments, jewelry, and precious ornaments.

Khosrow Khan Ardalan, however, did not remain loyal to the Shah’s daughter. Four years later, he married his cousin, Mah Sharaf Khanom better known as Mastureh Kurdistani.

After Amanollah Khan's death in 1240 AH (c. 1824 CE), Khosrow Khan was appointed governor of Kurdistan. Ten years later, in 1250 AH (c. 1834 CE), he died of the plague. Hosn Jahan Khanom and Khosrow Khan had six children: Reza Qoli Khan, Ardalan Khan—known as Gholamshah Khan—Khan Ahmad Khan, Khanom Khanom-ha, Adelah Soltan, and Agha Khanom.

Following Khosrow Khan’s death, the governorship of Kurdistan passed to his eldest son, Reza-Qoli Khan. As he was only ten years old, his mother, Hosn Jahan Khanom, assumed full control of the administration. Meanwhile, upon hearing of Khosrow Khan’s death, Ardeshir Mirza, son of Abbas Mirza, marched from Garus toward Sanandaj with the aim of seizing Kurdistan. Hosn Jahan Khanom assembled the Ardalan forces and personally went out to the battlefield.

When Ardeshir Mirza realized that a woman was commanding the opposing army, he considered both victory and defeat a potential source of disgrace. As a result, he chose diplomacy over war and transformed the conflict into celebration by proposing marriage to Valiyeh’s daughter, Khanom Khanom-ha. In return, Valiyeh sought the hand of Tuba Khanom, Ardeshir Mirza's sister, for her son Reza-Qoli Khan. In 1252 AH (c. 1836 CE), the bride was brought to Kurdistan, further strengthening Hosn Jahan Khanom’s ties with the royal court.

Hosn Jahan Khanom effectively ruled Kurdistan for about ten years. Her eldest son, who had grown resentful of her authority, rose against her. Although she emerged victorious in this confrontation, she formally transferred the governorship to him and continued to manage affairs from behind the scenes. In her later years, she increasingly devoted herself to poetry, yet she remained within the circle of power until the end of her life, leaving behind a respected and honorable legacy. She then devoted herself to the development and prosperity of Kurdistan. She died in 1278 AH, during the reign of Naser al-Din Shah Qajar.

She was the first woman in modern Iranian history to rule with authority for several years; for this reason, she became known by the title “Valiyeh” (female governor).
