= Abdollah Mirza Dara =

Prince of Qajar Iran (1796–1846)

Abdollah Mirza
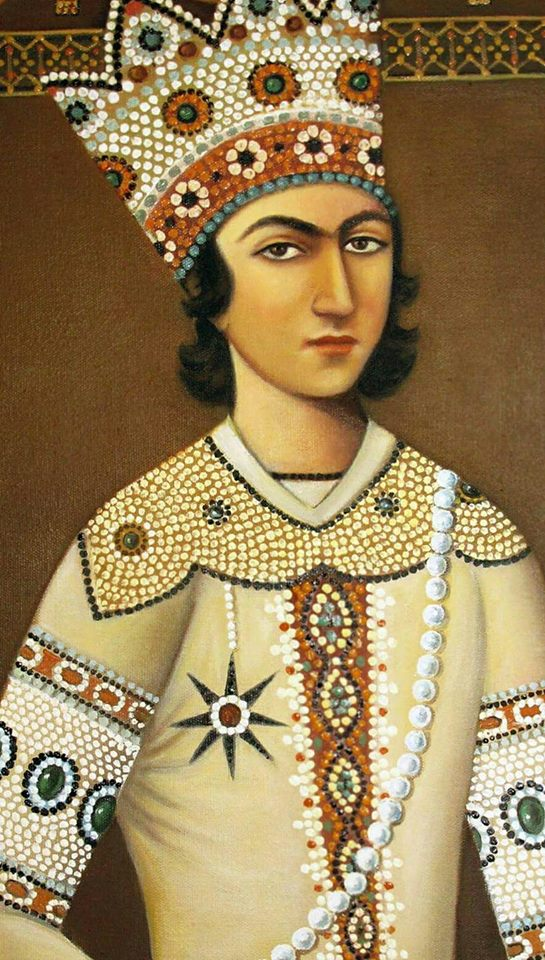
- Abdollah Mirza as depicted by an anonymous Armenian painter

Governor of Zanjan
- Tenure: 1809–1827
- Successor: Fathollah Mirza Shoa os-Saltaneh
- Born: 25 November 1796; Shiraz, Qajar Iran
- Died: 18 June 1846 (aged 49)
- Issue: Mohsen Mirza Mir Akhor
- Dynasty: Qajar
- Father: Fath-Ali Shah Qajar
- Mother: Kulthum Khanum

Abdollah Mirza Qajar (Persian: شاهزاده عبدالله میرزا قاجار; 25 November 1796 – 18 June 1846) was an Iranian prince (shahzadeh) of the Qajar dynasty, the 11th son of Fath-Ali Shah Qajar, the second shah of Qajar Iran from 1797 to 1834. Abdollah was the governor of Zanjan. He had two children, Mohsen Mirza and Shams al-Molok, with his wife. Other than that, he had 19 sons and 9 daughters from his concubines.

Abdollah Mirza distinguished himself early on in the Russo-Iranian War of 1826. Though his administration was accompanied by growth and development, he was twice ousted from the government due to complaints. The second time, Fath-Ali Shah handed over the rule of Zanjan to his other son, Fathollah Mirza. Following the death of Fath-Ali Shah, Abdollah tried to reclaim his rule by mobilizing and attacking Zanjan but failed. When during the early reign of Mohammad Shah Qajar (r. 1834-1848) the eldest sons of Fath-Ali Shah rebelled against him, Abdollah Mirza, unlike his other brothers, went on to confirm his rule.

He spent the last years of his life in the capital Tehran away from government jobs and spent time with scholars and writers, writing literary works and poetry. He wrote poetry under the pseudonym "Dara" and in addition to two books, wrote a divan of over fifty thousand verses.

== Early life ==
Abdollah Mirza was born on 25 November 1796 in Shiraz as the eleventh son of Baba Khan (later known as Fath-Ali Shah Qajar; r. 1797-1834) and a sayyida mother named Kulthum Khanum, a Mazandarani lady from a local landholder family. After the death of Fath-Ali Shah, she was one of few of his wives that were allowed to visit his successor and grandson, Mohammad Shah Qajar (r. 1834-1848). At Abdollah Mirza's birth, Agha Mohammad Khan was the ruling monarch. In 1797, when Abdollah Mirza was one year old, his father Baba Khan was crowned as Shah of Iran with the regnal name of Fath-Ali Shah after his predecessor's assassination.

Abdollah Mirza lived in his father's court in Tehran until he was thirteen years old. He benefited from the "wise men" there and received the education fit for a prince.

== Career ==
=== Rule over Zanjan ===
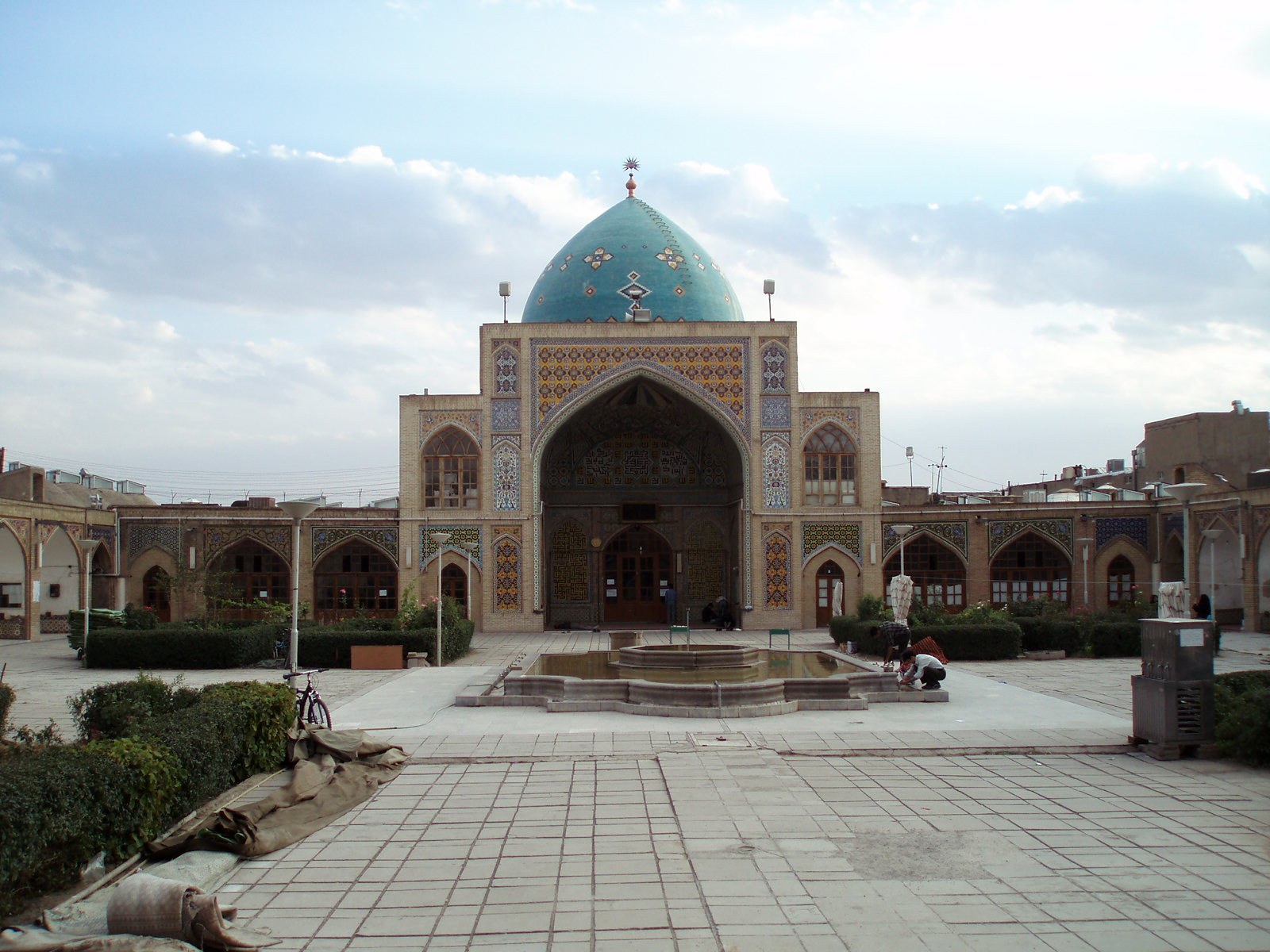
Jameh Mosque of Zanjan, constructed during Abdollah Mirza's rule.

In March 1809, Abdollah Mirza, who was thirteen at the time, was appointed by his father to rule the cities of Zanjan, Sojas, Sohrevard, Abhar, and Soltanieh. He was also the governor of the Khamseh province. Mohammad Taqi Saheb Ali Abadi, Fath-Ali Shah's favorite poet, was appointed as Abdollah Mirza's regent. Because of his guardian's teachings, Abdollah Mirza developed a taste in poetry. Ali Abadi served as regent for Abdollah Mirza until 1819, when Fath-Ali Shah ordered him to return to Tehran. Abdollah Mirza's rule over Zanjan was a period of prosperity and development. By his order, the Jameh Mosque of Zanjan (built in 1826) and Zanjan Government House were built. The Zanjan Bazaar was expanded as well.

In 1810, Abdollah Mirza was informed of valuables being discovered in an area by a mountain near Zanjan. Abdollah sent for an investigation. They discovered the tomb of Arghun Khan, Ilkhan of Ilkhanate which was filled with gold and jewelry. Abdollah Mirza brought the findings to Tehran and presented them to Fath-Ali Shah. They were placed in the treasury by the Shah's order. After this incident, Prince Hossein Ali Mirza Farman Farma, governor of Fars and brother of Abdollah Mirza, immediately opened tombs of Achaemenid shahs in Marvdasht and found them empty. (Note: Iranian writer Habib Yaghmai adopted this event into his book, "Tomb of Arghun".)

In 1811 (or according to another source, 1812), Abdollah Mirza, aged fifteen, married the daughter of Soleyman Khan Qajar Etezad ol-Dowleh, laleh of Abbas Mirza. As a result of the marriage, Abdollah Mirza was considered a relative of Malek Jahan Khanom, wife of Mohammad Shah Qajar and mother of the future Naser al-Din Shah Qajar (r. 1848-1896). According to tradition, Abdollah Mirza's family took a summer trip to Soltanieh, where Fath-Ali Shah held a wedding party there for the new couple. Abdollah Mirza had two children, Mohsen Mirza and Shams al-Molok, with his wife. Otherwise, he had 19 sons and 9 daughters from his many concubines.

=== Presence in wars ===
In 1822, during the Ottoman-Persian War, Abdollah Mirza joined his nephew Muhammad Hussein Mirza Heshmat al-Dawlah, son of Dowlatshah by his father's order. They were on their way to Iraq to conquer Baghdad and Shahr-e Zur. Abdollah Mirza took command of soldiers from Astarabad, Damghan, and Semnan and headed to Shahr-e Zur with his army. He initially succeeded, but with an outbreak of cholera among the army, the troops dispersed.

During the Second Russo-Persian War, Abdollah Mirza moved to Ardabil with an army to help Abbas Mirza, the crown prince and his older brother. During the war, Abdollah Mirza fought Valerian Madatov, a veteran of both Russo-Persian wars, and successfully looted horses, guns, and supplies.

=== Removal from Zanjan government ===
In 1827, vassals complained to Fath-Ali Shah about Abdollah Mirza and the Shah removed him from the government, but by offering 12,000 tomans to his father, he was able to regain the governorship. The date of his second removal from governorship is unknown, but in 1834, the governor of Zanjan was Fathollah Mirza (35th son of Fath Ali Shah), and at that time Abdollah Mirza was serving his father. The exact reasons why Abdollah Mirza was ousted are unknown, but according to James Edward Alexander, a Scottish soldier and traveller, who met him in 1821, Abdollah's character was greedy and tyrannical and his subjects were the most oppressed people in Iran. As a result of his government, people suffered from poverty and the temperament of plunder and shamelessness had prevailed over them.

=== Attempted overthrow of Fathollah Mirza ===
Abdollah Mirza accompanied Fath-Ali Shah on his trip to Fars in 1834. However, the shah died while in Isfahan. After his father's death, Abdollah Mirza rushed to Zanjan to oust Fathollah Mirza and take over. Abdollah Mirza had buried property under government buildings in Zanjan during his rule, he feared that if he did not take control of the city, he would lose all of it. He reached Zanjan in a short time and gathered and mounted three thousand men from the villages of that area and the Valusi tribe. Ten days later, he went to Zanjan and camped a mile from the city. In return, Fathollah Mirza prepared an experienced and well-equipped army to confront his brother.

Abdollah Mirza's troops, who were from different clans, were aware of the situation of Fathollah Mirza's forces and predicted the severity of the battle ahead. They dispersed two hours before dawn before any confrontation took place, and Abdollah Mirza was forced to flee to Qazvin. A few days later, Prince Mohammad Mirza (the son of the late crown prince, Abbas Mirza), who was heading from Tabriz to Tehran to sit on the throne, arrived in Zanjan and ratified the rule of Fathollah Mirza. Abdollah Mirza, who had failed to reclaim his rule, returned to Tehran and pledged allegiance to his nephew, Mohammad Shah, as King of Iran.

=== Final years and death ===
During the reign of Mohammad Shah, Abdollah Mirza resigned from government affairs. He often traveled with the Shah and took part in Mohammad Shah's expedition of Herat. According to the modern historian, Ardakani, Abdollah Mirza foretold his own death and died on that exact date, 18 June 1846.

== Studies and writings ==
Abdollah Mirza studied Islamic astronomy under his brother Mohammad Vali Mirza. Abdollah Mirza was also a writer and poet. He wrote poetry under the pseudonym "Dara" and knew the principles of poetry and prose. His divan consists of fifty thousand verses and contains poems and lyric poems. Another divan he wrote was Divan-e Marathi. He also co-wrote a satirical mathnavi called Golnameh or Kalnameh about the life of a balding person with his brother Mohammad Reza Mirza. The only known prose work of Abdollah Mirza is a satirical book that was completed in 1845, Qanun va Basat Neshat.

== Bibliography ==
- Afshar Far, Naser (2003). سرگذشت فتحعلی شاه [Life of Fath-Ali Shah] (in Persian). Tehran: Ahl-e-Qalam Publications. ISBN 9789645568489. OCLC 145133976.
- Ahangaran, Amir (Spring 2013). "بررسی دلایل ناکامی محمدشاه قاجار در اعاده حاکمیت ایران بر شهر هرات (1255- 1251 ﻫ/ 1839-1835م)" [Investigating the reasons for the failure of Mohammad Shah Qajar in restoring Iranian rule over Herat (1835-1839)]. Journal of Historical Research (in Persian) (1): 11–39. ISSN 2476-3306, 2008-6253 OCLC 8464665587, 1229701078.
- Al Davod, Ali (Winter 2001). "دخمه ارغون" [A look at Tomb of Arghun by Habib Yaghmaei]. Nashr-e Dansh (in Persian) (102): 57–58. ISSN 0259-9090. OCLC 607709011.
- Alexander, James Edward (1827). "Travels from India to England comprehending a visit to the Burman Empire, and a journey through Persia, Asia Minor, European Turkey, &c. in the years 1825-26". London: Parbury, Allen. OCLC 680957586 – via Internet Archive. Reprinted: ISBN 9788121509381
- Amanat, Abbas (1993). "FATḤ-ʿALĪ SHAH QĀJĀR". In Yarshater, Ehsan (ed.). Encyclopædia Iranica. Vol. VI/4: Cotton II–Čūb-bāzī. London and New York: Routledge & Kegan Paul. pp. 407–421. ISBN 978-1-56859-002-8.
- Amanat, Abbas (1999). "ʿABDALLĀH MĪRZĀ DĀRĀ". Encyclopædia Iranica, online edition. New York.
- Arin Pour, Yahya (1978). از صبا تا نيما : تاريخ 150 سال ادب فارسى [From Saba to Nima: History of 150 years of Persian literature] (in Persian). Tehran: Pocket Books Publications. OCLC 613163464, 604558605, 1222222566.
- Behzadi, Mohammad Reza (2009). "Zanjan in Qajar era; (Research in the documents of Mirza Abolmakarem Mousavi Zanjani)". Journal of Contemporary Iranian History. 53: 277–356.
- Hossein Ali, Hassan (2009). گذرى بر تاريخ زنجان [A passage on the history of Zanjan] (in Persian). Zanjan: Knowledge Publications. ISBN 9786005429114. OCLC 702645029.
- Khatibi, Bahman (2012). History of Khatibi family of Zanjan. Zanjan: Zanjan Knowledge Publications. ISBN 9786005934588.
- Mahbubi Ardekani, H. (1982). "ʿABDALLĀH MĪRZĀ DĀRĀ". Encyclopædia Iranica, online edition. New York.
- Malik Shahmirzadi, Sadeq (1986). "اشاره ای مختصر بر تحول باستانشناسی در ایران" [A brief reference to the evolution of archeology in Iran]. Athar (in Persian). 12: 133–160. OCLC 957392238.
- Teymouri, Ibrahim (2013). تارىخ سىاسى ايران در دورۀ قاجار [Political history of Iran in the Qajar period] (in Persian). Tehran: Sokhan Publications. ISBN 9789643726164. OCLC 876401828.
