= Shahr-e Zur =

Shahr-e Zur شهرزور
- Village
- Location within Iran
- Coordinates: 36°29′56″N 45°49′30″E
- Country: Iran
- Province: West Azerbaijan
- County: Mahabad
- Bakhsh: Khalifan
- Rural District: Kani Bazar

Population (2006)
  - Total: 279
- Time zone: UTC+3:30 (IRST)
  - Summer (DST): UTC+4:30 (IRDT)

Shahr-e Zur (Persian: شهرزور, also Romanized as Shahr-e Zūr) is a village in Kani Bazar Rural District, Khalifan District, Mahabad County, West Azerbaijan Province, Iran. At the 2006 census, its population was 279, in 47 families.
