= 1797 in Iran =

- Decades
- See also: Other events of 1797; Years in Iran

The following lists events that have happened in 1797 in the Qajar dynasty, Iran.

== Incumbents ==
- Monarch: Mohammad Khan Qajar (until June 17), Fat′h-Ali Shah Qajar (starting June 17)

== Events ==
- June 17 - Fath-Ali Shah Qajar ascended to the throne.

== Death ==
- June 17 - Mohammad Khan Qajar, first king of Qajar Dynasty, was assassinated in Shusha, capital of Karabakh Khanate.
