= Helena Dorothea von Schönberg =

German business person

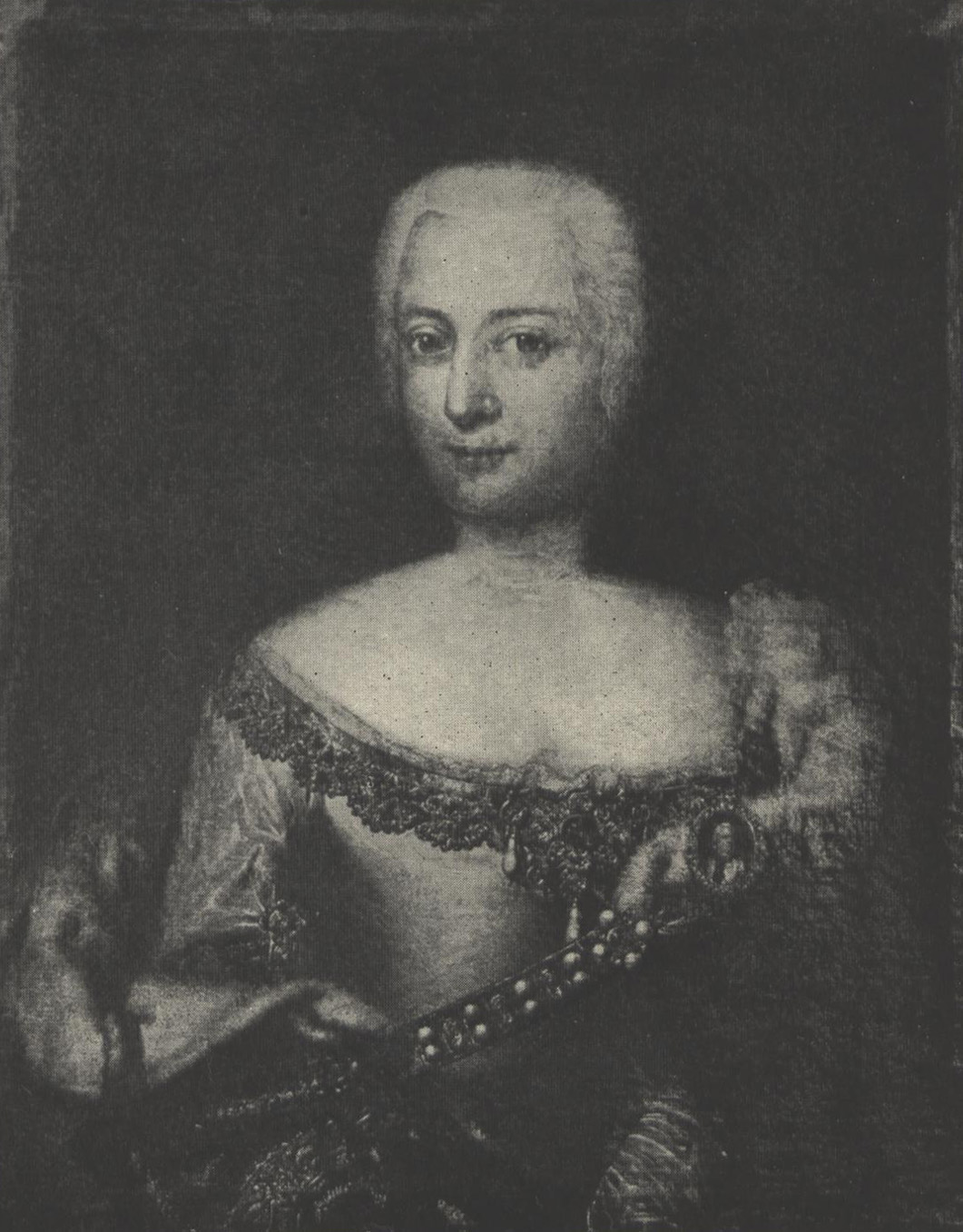
Helena Dorothea von Schönberg (undated painting)

Helena Dorothea von Schönberg (born von Wallwitz; 22 November 1729 – 29 March 1799) was a German businessperson and mistress of Limbach, which she helped to flourish.

Helena Dorothea von Schönberg had the foresight to recognize the economic and social opportunities offered by the knitting industry introduced in Limbach by Johann Esche and the serpentinite industry founded by her husband in 1751.
