= 1799 =

1799 in various calendars
- Gregorian calendar: 1799; MDCCXCIX
- French Republican calendar: 7–8; VII–VIII
- Ab urbe condita: 2552
- Armenian calendar: 1248; ԹՎ ՌՄԽԸ
- Assyrian calendar: 6549
- Balinese saka calendar: 1720–1721
- Bengali calendar: 1205–1206
- Berber calendar: 2749
- British Regnal year: 39 Geo. 3 – 40 Geo. 3
- Buddhist calendar: 2343
- Burmese calendar: 1161
- Byzantine calendar: 7307–7308
- Chinese calendar: 戊午年 (Earth Horse); 4496 or 4289 — to — 己未年 (Earth Goat); 4497 or 4290
- Coptic calendar: 1515–1516
- Discordian calendar: 2965
- Ethiopian calendar: 1791–1792
- Hebrew calendar: 5559–5560
- Hindu calendars
- Vikram Samvat: 1855–1856
- Shaka Samvat: 1720–1721
- Kali Yuga: 4899–4900
- Holocene calendar: 11799
- Igbo calendar: 799–800
- Iranian calendar: 1177–1178
- Islamic calendar: 1213–1214
- Japanese calendar: Kansei 11 (寛政１１年)
- Javanese calendar: 1725–1726
- Julian calendar: Gregorian minus 11 days
- Korean calendar: 4132
- Minguo calendar: 113 before ROC 民前113年
- Nanakshahi calendar: 331
- Thai solar calendar: 2341–2342
- Tibetan calendar: ས་ཕོ་རྟ་ལོ་ (male Earth-Horse); 1925 or 1544 or 772 — to — ས་མོ་ལུག་ལོ་ (female Earth-Sheep); 1926 or 1545 or 773

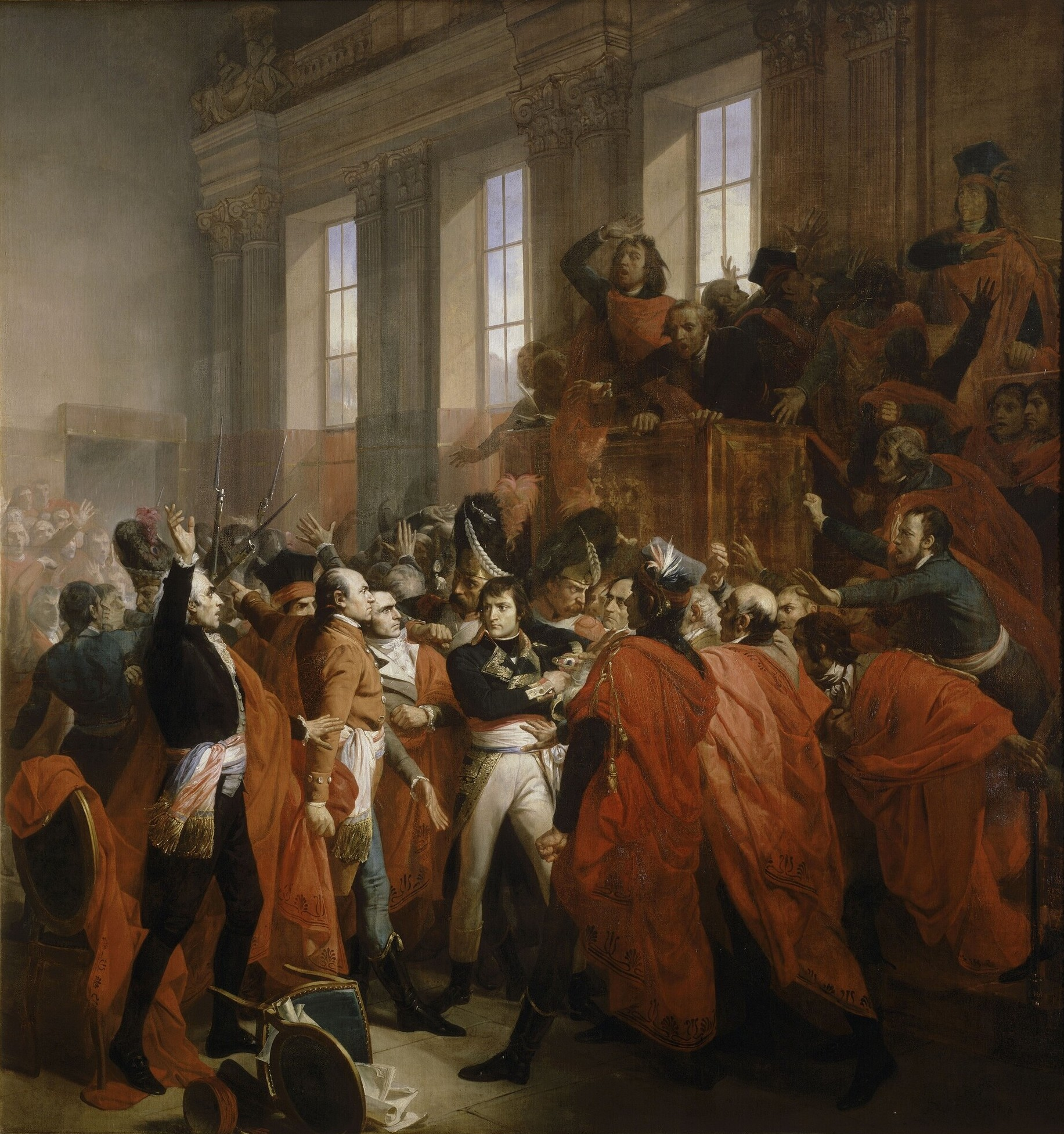
November 9: Napoleon overthrows the French Directory, ends French Revolution with the Coup of 18 Brumaire.

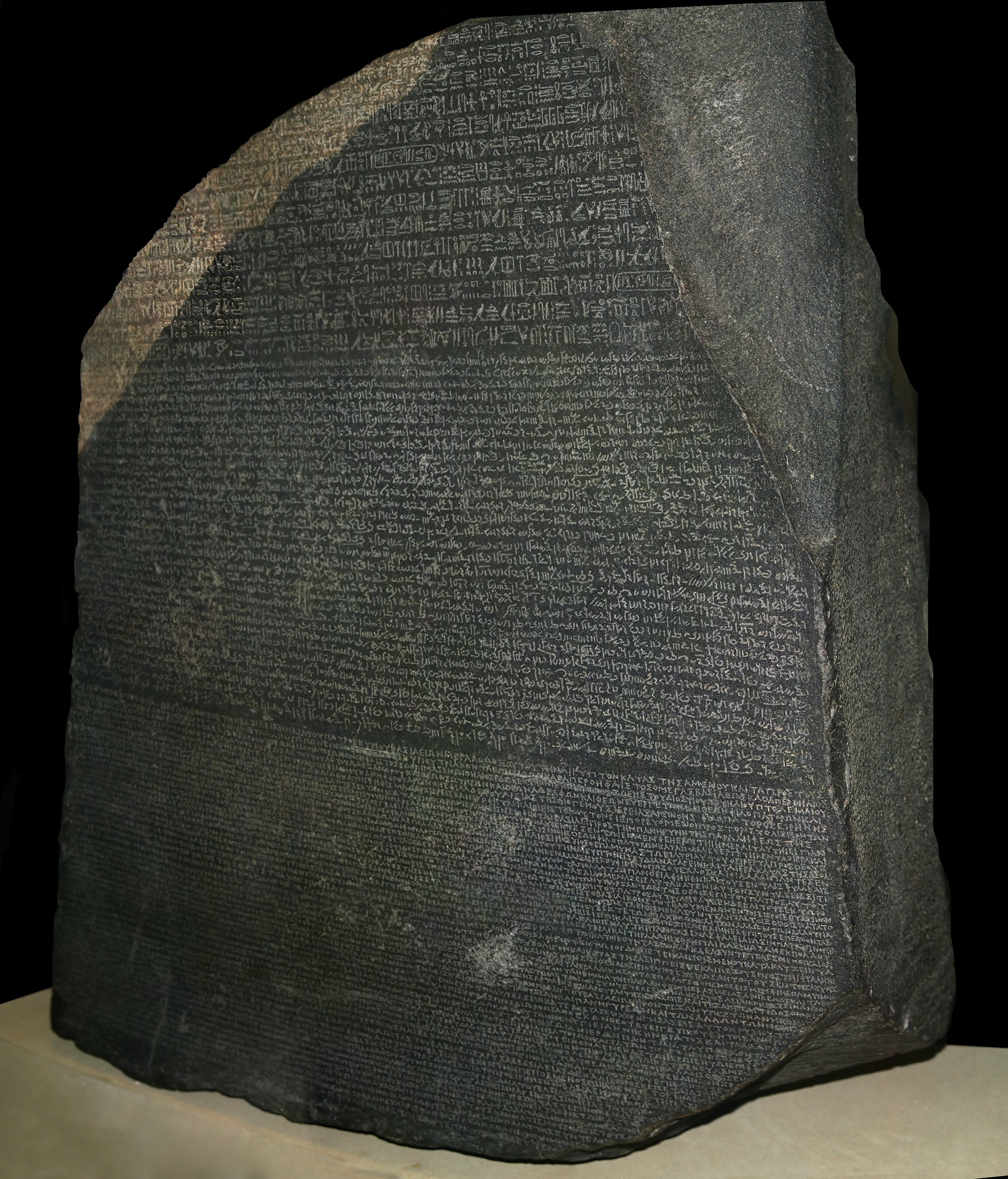
July 15: French Captain Pierre-François Bouchard finds the Rosetta Stone.

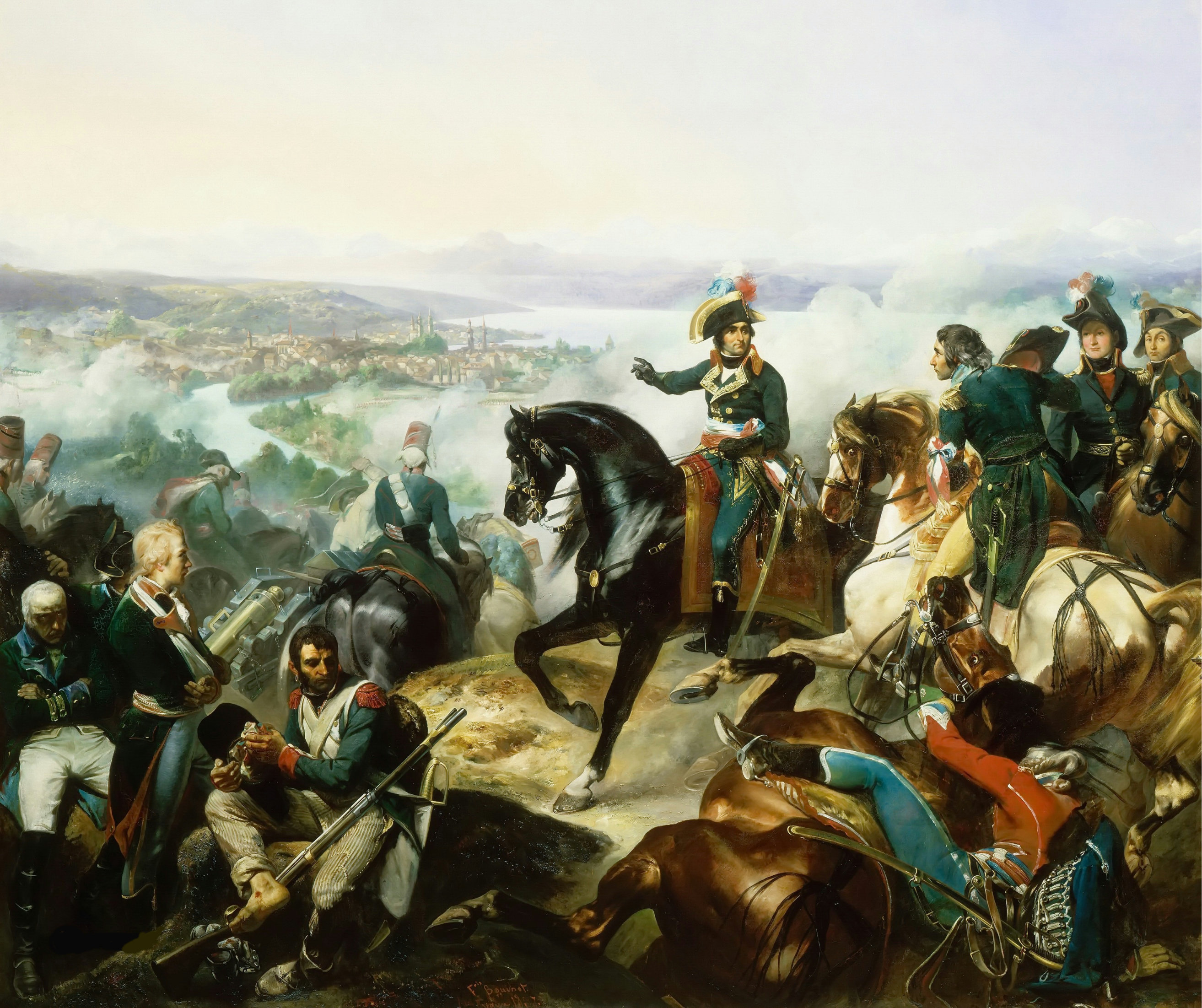
September 25: Second Battle of Zurich

1799 (MDCCXCIX) was a common year starting on Tuesday of the Gregorian calendar and a common year starting on Saturday of the Julian calendar, the 1799th year of the Common Era (CE) and Anno Domini (AD) designations, the 799th year of the 2nd millennium, the 99th year of the 18th century, and the 10th and last year of the 1790s decade. As of the start of 1799, the Gregorian calendar was 11 days ahead of the Julian calendar, which remained in localized use until 1923.

== Events ==
=== January–March ===
- January 9 – British Prime Minister William Pitt the Younger introduces an income tax of two shillings to the pound, to raise funds for Great Britain's effort in the French Revolutionary Wars.
- January 17 – Maltese patriot Dun Mikiel Xerri, along with a number of other patriots, is executed.
- January 21 – The Parthenopean Republic is established in Naples by French General Jean Étienne Championnet; King Ferdinand I of the Two Sicilies flees.
- January 27 – French Revolutionary Wars: Macau Incident – French and Spanish warships encounter a British Royal Navy escort squadron in the Wanshan Archipelago of China inconclusively.
- February 7 – The Jiaqing Emperor of China comes into his full powers on the death of his father, the Qianlong Emperor. He prosecutes corrupt court official Heshen and issues a decree prohibiting the import of opium to China.
- February 9 – Quasi-War: In the single-ship action of USS Constellation vs L'Insurgente in the Caribbean, the American ship is the victor.
- February 28 – French Revolutionary Wars: Action of 28 February 1799 – British Royal Navy frigate HMS Sybille defeats the French frigate Forte off the mouth of the Hooghly River in the Bay of Bengal, but both captains are killed.
- March 1 – Federalist James Ross becomes President pro tempore of the United States Senate.
- March 4 – The Russo-Ottoman Siege of Corfu (1798–1799) ends with the surrender of the French garrison, bringing an end to the first period of French rule in the Ionian Islands (1797–1799).
- March 7 – War of the Second Coalition: Siege of Jaffa – Napoleon captures Jaffa in Palestine from the Ottomans and his troops proceed to kill more than 2,000 Albanian captives.
- March 14 – The public premiere of Haydn’s oratorio The Creation takes place at the Burgtheater in Vienna.
- March 21 – War of the Second Coalition: Victory of Archduke Charles and the Austrian army over the French army of Jean-Baptiste Jourdan at the Battle of Ostrach.
- March 23 – War of the Second Coalition: Victory of Franjo Jelačić and the Austrian army over the French army of André Masséna at the Battle of Feldkirch.
- March 25 – War of the Second Coalition: Victory of Archduke Charles and the Austrian army over the French army of Jean-Baptiste Jourdan at the Battle of Stockach (1799), a key crossroads at the western end of Lake Constance.
- March 29 – New York passes a law aimed at gradually abolishing slavery in the state.

=== April–June ===
- April 16 – French Revolutionary Wars: At the Battle of Mount Tabor severely outnumbered French forces repulse an Ottoman attack.
- April 27 – French Revolutionary Wars: The Battle of Cassano takes place outside of Milan, as Russian and Austrian troops commanded by General Alexander Suvorov rout the French Army under the command of General Jean Moreau.
- April 28 – Two French diplomats to the Second Congress of Rastatt are killed and another badly injured by Austrian cavalry, as they tried to leave the town. An inquiry was held, which blamed French emigres.
- May 4 – Battle of Seringapatam: Tipu Sultan is defeated and killed by the British, ending the captivity of Mangalorean Catholics at Seringapatam ends and concluding the Fourth Anglo-Mysore War.
- May 21 – The Siege of Acre ends after two months; Napoleon's attempt to widen his Middle Eastern campaign into Syria is frustrated by Ottoman forces, and he withdraws to Egypt.
- May 27 – War of the Second Coalition: Battle of Winterthur – Habsburg forces secure control of north-east Switzerland from the French Army of the Danube.
- June 7 – War of the Second Coalition: First Battle of Zurich – Four days of fighting ends in victory for Archduke Charles and the Austrian army over the French army under André Masséna.
- June 13 – Ferdinand I of the Two Sicilies is restored to his kingdom following the collapse of the Parthenopean Republic.
- June 17 – War of the Second Coalition: Battle of the Trebbia – The beginning of the battle that marked the debacle of Étienne Macdonald's French army. Suvorov scores a comprehensive victory.
- June 18 – French Revolutionary Wars: Action of 18 June 1799 – A French frigate squadron, under Rear-admiral Perrée, is captured by the British fleet under Lord Keith, off Toulon.

=== July–September ===
- July 7 – Ranjit Singh's men take their positions outside Lahore.
- July 12 – Ranjit Singh captures Lahore from the Bhangi Misl, a key step in establishing the Sikh Empire, and becoming Maharaja of the Punjab.
- July 15 – In the Egyptian port city of Rosetta, French Captain Pierre Bouchard finds the Rosetta Stone.
- July 25 – Battle of Abukir: French forces under Napoleon Bonaparte defeat 20,000 Ottoman Mamluk troops under Mustafa Pasha at Abukir. The French suffer only 220 dead and 600 wounded while the Ottoman losses are enormous: 2,000 dead on the battlefield, 11,000 men drowned, 5,000 prisoners of war. Napoleon captures 100 Ottoman banners, 32 guns, 400 horses and three Pashas' Bunchuks (ceremonial flags issued to Pasha).
- August 15 – War of the Second Coalition: Battle of Novi – the defeat of Barthélemy Joubert's army by Suvorov's Austrian–Russian troops.
- August 23 – Napoleon Bonaparte leaves the command of the French army (some 10,000 men) to General Jean-Baptiste Kléber. He secretly embarks on the frigate Muiron in a small French flotilla – with Alexandre Berthier, Joachim Murat and Jean Lannes – and several of his servants to France. Kléber reads a proclamation to the troops: "My soldiers, extraordinary circumstances have persuaded me to return, for the benefit of France."
- August 27 – War of the Second Coalition: Anglo-Russian invasion of Holland – Britain and Russia send an expedition to the Batavian Republic.
- August 29 – Pope Pius VI, at this time the longest-reigning Pontiff of the Roman Catholic Church, dies as a prisoner of war in the citadel of the French city of Valence, after 24½ years of rule.
- August 30 – Anglo-Russian invasion of Holland: Vlieter Incident – A squadron of the Batavian Republic's navy, commanded by Rear-Admiral Samuel Story, surrenders to the British Royal Navy, under Sir Ralph Abercromby and Admiral Sir Charles Mitchell, near Wieringen, without joining action.
- September 10 – Anglo-Russian invasion of Holland: Battle of Krabbendam – The Russo-British expedition force defends its initial gains from attacks by Franco-Dutch forces.
- September 18 – War of the Second Coalition: Battle of Mannheim – Victory of Archduke Charles and the Austrian army over a French force under Jacques Léonard Muller
- September 19 – Anglo-Russian invasion of Holland: Battle of Bergen – Franco-Dutch forces hold their ground against the Russo-British expedition force.
- September 23 – Frederick North, 5th Earl of Guilford, the Governor of British Ceylon (modern-day Sri Lanka), issues a proclamation declaring that the laws of the Netherlands for the conquered Dutch Ceylon shall be enforced until superseded by new laws.
- September 29 – The Second Roman Republic, a puppet state formed by the French Army after they dissolve the Papal States and the occupation of Rome, is dissolved 19 months after its creation on February 15, 1798.
- September 30 – Suvorov's Swiss campaign: Battle of Muottental – the rout of Masséna's French troops by Suvorov's army.

=== October–December ===
- October 2 – Anglo-Russian invasion of Holland: Battle of Alkmaar – The Russo-British expedition force wins a small tactical victory over the Franco-Dutch forces.
- October 6 – Anglo-Russian invasion of Holland: Battle of Castricum – Franco-Dutch forces defeat the Russo-British expedition force.
- October 9 – HMS Lutine (a famous treasure wreck) is sunk in the West Frisian Islands.
- October 12 – Jeanne Geneviève Labrosse becomes the first woman to jump from a balloon with a parachute, from an altitude of 900 metres (3,000 ft) over France.
- October 16 – War of the Second Coalition: Action of 16 October 1799 – A Spanish treasure convoy worth more than £54,000,000 is captured by the British Royal Navy off Vigo.
- October 18 – Anglo-Russian invasion of Holland: Anglo-Russian expedition forces surrender in North Holland.
- November 5 – HMS Sceptre is driven ashore and wrecked in a storm in Table Bay, South Africa, with the loss of 349 and 41 survivors.
- November 9 – Coup of 18 Brumaire: Napoleon overthrows the French Directory in a coup d'état, which ends the French Revolution.
- November 10 (19 Brumaire) – A remnant of the Council of Ancients in France abolishes the Constitution of the Year III, and ordains the French Consulate with Napoleon as First Consul, with the Constitution of the Year VIII.
- November 30 – 1799–1800 Papal conclave opens in Venice at San Giorgio Monastery.
- December 3 – War of the Second Coalition: Battle of Wiesloch: Austrian Lieutenant Field Marshal Anton Sztáray defeats the French at Wiesloch.
- December 10 – France adopts the metre as its official unit of length.
- December 14 – George Washington, first President of the United States, dies at Mount Vernon, Virginia, aged 67.
- December 31 – The Dutch East India Company's charter is allowed to expire by the Batavian Republic.

=== Date unknown ===
- The Place Royale in Paris is renamed Place des Vosges, when the Department of Vosges becomes the first to pay new Revolutionary taxes.
- Eli Whitney, holding a 1798 United States government contract for the manufacture of muskets, is introduced by Oliver Wolcott Jr. to the concept of interchangeable parts, an origin of the American system of manufacturing.
- Conrad John Reed, 12, finds what he describes as a "heavy yellow rock" along Little Meadow Creek in Cabarrus County, North Carolina, and makes it a doorstop in his home. Conrad's father John Reed learns that the rock is actually gold in 1802, initiating the first gold rush in the United States.
- The assassination of the 14th Tu'i Kanokupolu, Tukuʻaho, Tonga begins half a century of civil war in Tonga.
- The Nawab (provincial governor) of Oudh in northern India sends to George III of Great Britain the Padshah Nama, an official history of the reign of Shah Jahan.
- William Cockerill begins building cotton-spinning machinery in Belgium.
- The small town of Tignish, Prince Edward Island, Canada is founded.

== Births ==
=== January–June ===
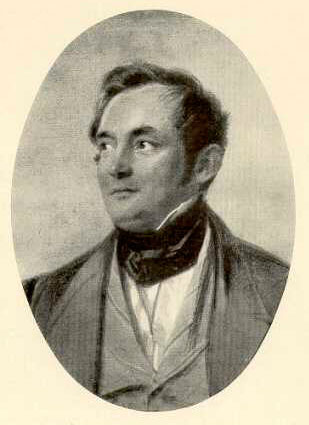
Carl Adolph von Basedow

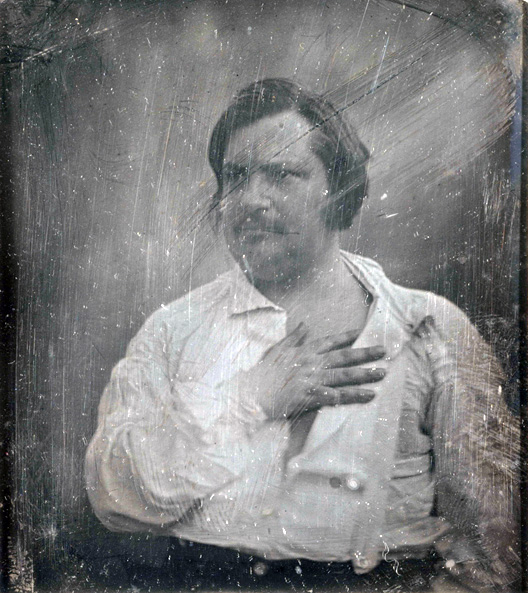
Honoré de Balzac

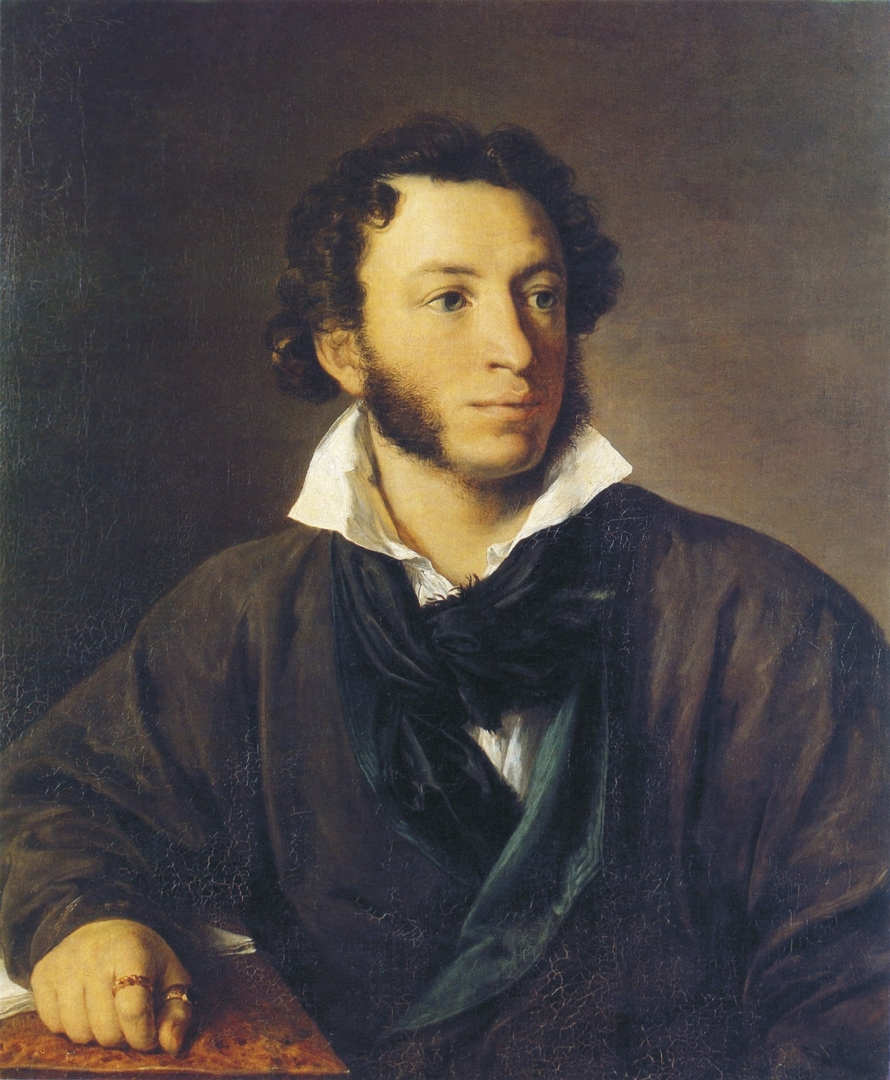
Alexander Pushkin

- January 6 – Jedediah Smith, American fur trapper, explorer (d. 1831)
- January 12 – Priscilla Susan Bury, British botanist (d. 1872)
- January 23 – Alois Negrelli, Tyrolean engineer, railroad pioneer active in the Austrian Empire (1858)
- January 31 – Rodolphe Töpffer, Swiss teacher, author and artist (d. 1846)
- February 4 – Almeida Garrett, Portuguese writer (d. 1854)
- February 11 – Basil Moreau, founder of the Congregation of Holy Cross (d. 1873)
- February 14 – Walenty Wańkowicz, Polish painter (d. 1842)
- February 17 – Carl Julian (von) Graba, German lawyer and ornithologist who visits the Faroe Islands (d. 1874)
- February 27 – Edward Belcher, British admiral (d. 1877)
- March 8 – Simon Cameron, American politician (d. 1889)
- March 16 – Anna Atkins, British botanist (d. 1871)
- March 22 – Friedrich Wilhelm Argelander, German astronomer (d. 1875)
- March 28 – Karl Adolph von Basedow, German physician, noted for reporting the symptoms of Graves–Basedow disease (d. 1854)
- March 29 – Edward Smith-Stanley, 14th Earl of Derby, Prime Minister of the United Kingdom (d. 1869)
- April 12 – Henri Druey, Swiss Federal Councilor (d. 1855)
- April 17 – Eliza Acton, English poet and cookery writer (d. 1859)
- May 9 – Philipp von Stadion und Thannhausen, Austrian field marshal (d. 1868)
- May 20 – Honoré de Balzac, French author (d. 1850)
- May 21 – Mary Anning, British paleontologist (d. 1847)
- May 25 – Alexei Lvov, Russian composer (d. 1870)
- June 3 – Elisabetta Fiorini Mazzanti, Italian botanist (d. 1879)
- June 6 – Alexander Pushkin, Russian author (d. 1837)
- June 18 – Prosper Ménière, French physician (d. 1862)
- June 25 – David Douglas, Scottish-born botanist (d. 1834)

=== July–December ===
- July 4 – King Oscar I of Sweden and Norway (d. 1859)
- July 6 – Michael Thomas Bass, English brewer (d. 1884)
- August 12
  - Francis Abbott, Australian astronomer (d. 1883)
  - Patrick MacDowell, Irish sculptor (d. 1870)
- August 20 – Heinrich von Gagern, German statesman and politician (d. 1880)
- September 1 – Ferenc Gyulay, Hungarian nobleman, general and governor (d. 1868)
- September 8 – James Bowman Lindsay, Scottish inventor (d. 1862)
- September 10 – George Willison Adams, American abolitionist (d. 1879)
- October 1 – John Brown Russwurm, Americo-Liberian journalist and governor of the African Republic of Maryland (d. 1851)
- October 18 – Christian Friedrich Schönbein, German chemist (d. 1868)
- October 26 – Margaret Agnes Bunn, British actress (d. 1883)
- November 1 – Thomas Baldwin Marsh, American religious leader (d. 1866)
- November 7 – James Syme, Scottish medical reformer (d. 1870)
- November 29 – Amos Bronson Alcott, American philosopher, educator and writer, father of novelist Louisa May Alcott (d. 1888)
- December 3 – Peggy Eaton, born Margaret O'Neill, wife of United States Secretary of State John Eaton and central character in the Petticoat affair (d. 1879)
- December 25 – Manuel Bulnes, Chilean general and politician, President of Chile (d. 1866)

=== Date unknown ===
- James Townsend Saward, English barrister, forger
- Domnița Rallou Caragea, Greek princess, independence activist (d. 1870)

== Deaths ==
=== January–June ===
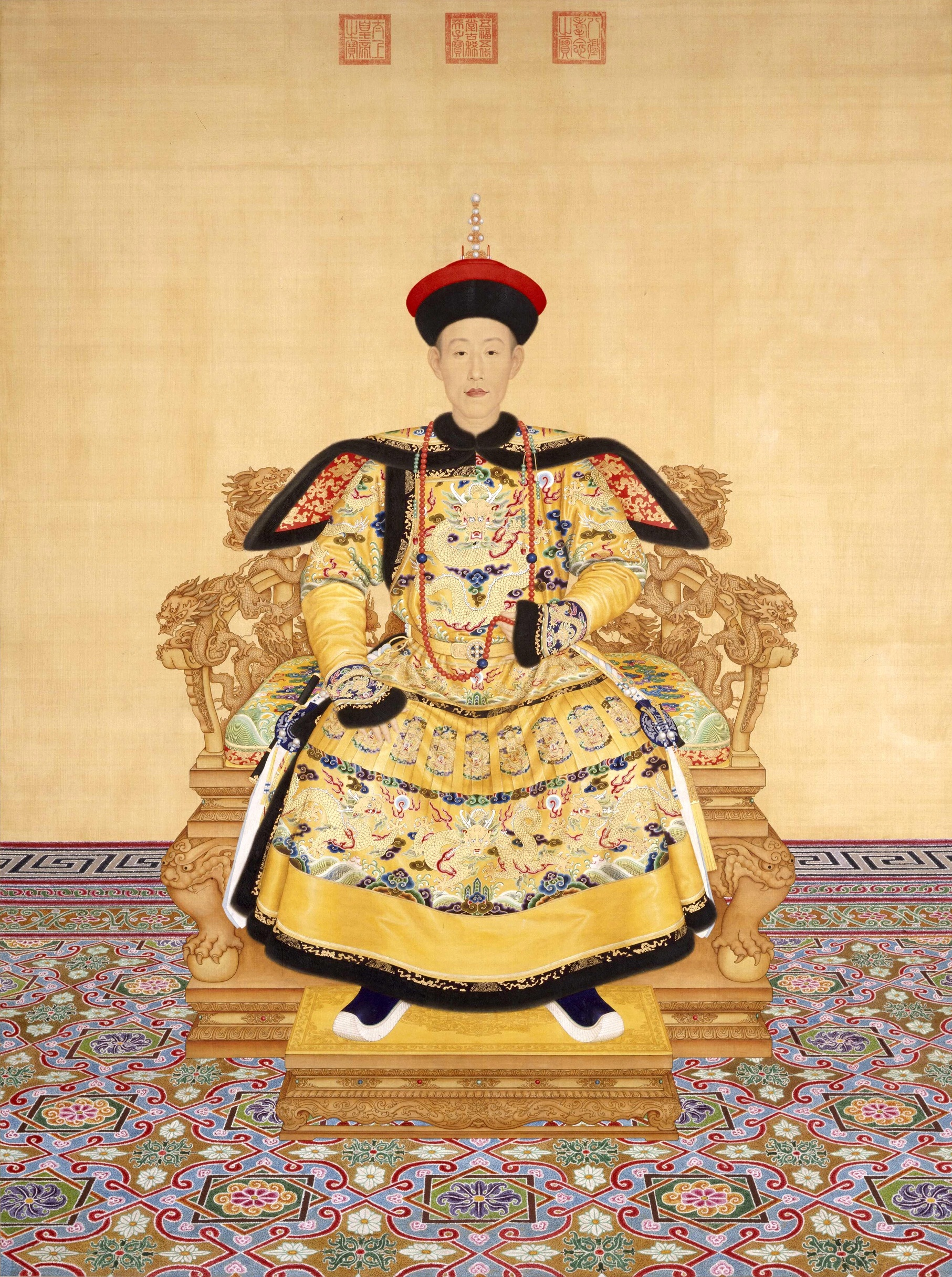
Qianlong Emperor

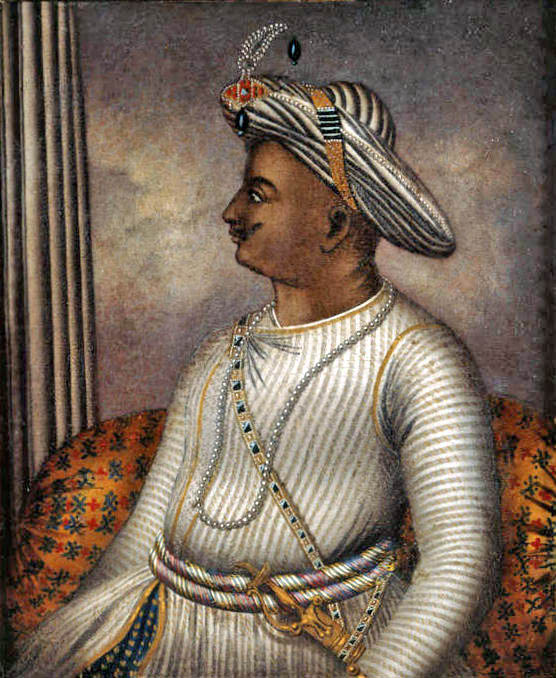
Tipu Sultan

- January 9 – Maria Gaetana Agnesi, Italian mathematician (b. 1718)
- January 18 – Heinrich Johann Nepomuk von Crantz, Luxembourgish botanist (b. 1722)
- January 22 – Horace-Bénédict de Saussure, Swiss aristocrat, alpinist (b. 1740)
- January 26 – Gabriel Christie (British Army officer), British Army general (b. 1722)
- February 6 – Étienne-Louis Boullée, French architect (b. 1728)
- February 7 – Qianlong Emperor of China (b. 1711)
- February 9 – Johann Baptist Babel, Swiss sculptor (b. 1716)
- February 12
  - František Xaver Dušek, Czech composer (b. 1731)
  - Lazzaro Spallanzani, Italian biologist, physiologist (b. 1729)
- February 16 – Charles Theodore, Elector of Bavaria (b. 1724)
- February 19 – Jean-Charles de Borda, French mathematician, physicist, political scientist and sailor (b. 1733)
- February 22 – Heshen, Manchu official under Qianlong (b. 1750)
- February 24 – Georg Christoph Lichtenberg, German scientist, satirist and Anglophile (b. 1742)
- March 13 – Richard Hotham, English property developer and politician (b. 1722)
- March 17 – Sir Charles Thompson, 1st Baronet, British admiral, politician (b. c. 1740)
- March 18
  - Charles Guillaume Le Normant d'Étiolles, French official, husband of Madame de Pompadour (b. 1717)
  - Adam Friedrich Oeser, German etcher (b. 1717)
- March 28 – Etta Palm d'Aelders, Dutch-French feminist (b. 1743)
- March 29 – Helena Dorothea von Schönberg, German industrialist (b. 1729)
- April 3 – Pierre Charles Le Monnier, French astronomer (b. 1715)
- April 6 – Alexander Bezborodko, Grand Chancellor of Russia, architect of Catherine the Great's foreign policy (b. 1747)
- April 28 – Matthew Griswold, 17th Governor of Connecticut (1784–1786) (b. 1714)
- May 2 – Guemes Padilla Horcasitas, Viceroy of New Spain (b. 1740)
- May 4 – Tipu Sultan, Indian warrior and ruler of the Kingdom of Mysore, killed in battle (b. 1750)
- May 18 – Pierre Beaumarchais, French writer (b. 1732)
- May 22 – Toypurina, Medicine woman of the Tongva nation and rebel leader (b. 1750)
- May 26 – James Burnett, Lord Monboddo, Scottish jurist (b. 1714)
- May 30 – Robert McQueen, Lord Braxfield, Scottish advocate and judge (b. 1722)
- June 6 – Patrick Henry, American revolutionary politician, Governor of Virginia (b. 1736)
- June 7 – Victoire of France, French princess (b.1733)
- June 10 – Chevalier de Saint-Georges, Guadeloupe-born French musician (b. 1745)
- June 24 – Dunbar Douglas, 4th Earl of Selkirk, Scottish peer (b. 1722)
- June 30 – Francesco Caracciolo, Neapolitan admiral, revolutionist (b. 1752)

=== July–December ===
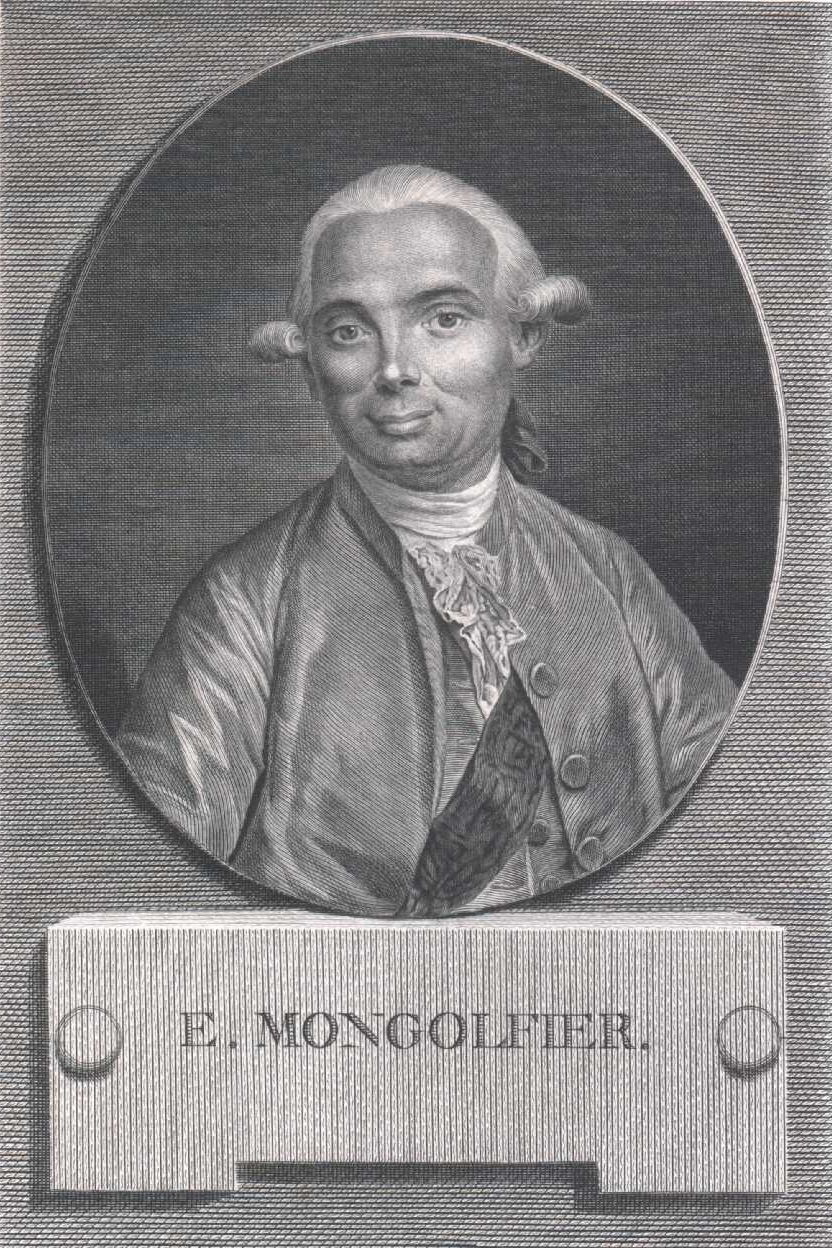
Jacques-Étienne Montgolfier

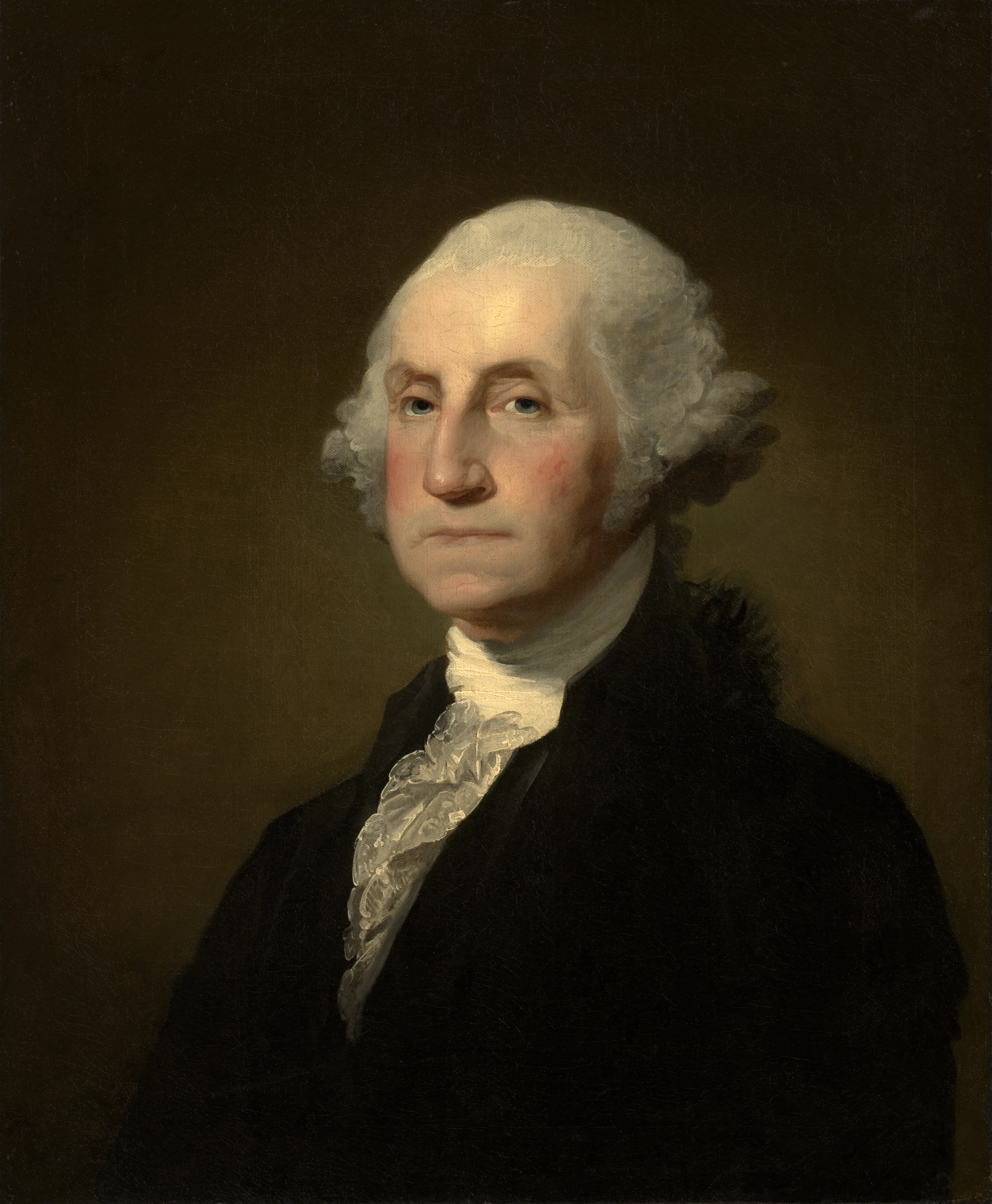
George Washington

- July 7 – William Curtis, English botanist, entomologist (b. 1746)
- August 2 – Jacques Étienne Montgolfier, French inventor of the hot-air balloon, balloonist (b. 1744)
- August 4 – John Bacon, British sculptor (b. 1740)
- August 5 – Richard Howe, British admiral (b. 1726)
- August 15 – Barthélemy Catherine Joubert, French general (b. 1769)
- August 29 – Pope Pius VI (b. 1717)
- August 31 – Nicolas-Henri Jardin, French architect (b. 1720)
- September 7
  - Jan Ingenhousz, Dutch physician, physiologist, biologist and chemist (b. 1730)
  - Louis Guillaume Lemonnier, French botanist (b. 1717)
- October 6 – William Withering, British physician (b. 1741)
- October 9 – Pierre Pigneau de Behaine, French priest who helped to establish the Nguyễn dynasty (b. 1741)
- October 20 – James Iredell, Associate Justice of the Supreme Court of the United States (b. 1751)
- October 24 – Carl Ditters von Dittersdorf, Austrian composer (b. 1739)
- November 22 – Judith van Dorth, Dutch orangist (b. 1747)
- November 23 – Mark Robinson (Royal Navy officer), Royal Navy admiral (b. 1722)
- December 6 – Joseph Black, Scottish physician, physicist and chemist (b. 1728)
- December 14 – George Washington, military leader of the American Revolution, president of the Constitutional Convention (1787) and 1st President of the United States (b. 1732)
- December 18 – Jean-Étienne Montucla, French mathematician (b. 1725)
- December 31 – Jean-François Marmontel, French historian and writer (b. 1723)
