= 1855 in Iran =

- Decades
- See also: Other events of 1855; Years in Iran

The following lists events that happened during 1855 in Qajar era.

== Incumbents ==
- Monarch: Naser al-Din Shah Qajar

== Births ==
- January 14 – Joseph Cochran, American missionary.
- ? – Ismat al-Doulah, Persian royal.
- ? – Mirza Ebrahim Khan Sahhafbashi, Iranian photographer and cinematographer.
- ? – Forsat-od-Dowleh Shirazi, Iranian poet, literary and musician.
