= Ahmad Mirza Azd es-Saltaneh =

Iranian prince (1891–1939)

Ahmad Mirza
- Azd es-Saltaneh
- Born: 1891
- Died: 1939 (aged 47–48)
- Burial: Qom, Iran
- Dynasty: Qajar
- Father: Naser al-Din Shah Qajar
- Mother: Turan es-Saltaneh
- Religion: Shia Islam

Prince Ahmad Mirza Azd es-Saltaneh (Persian: احمد میرزا عضدالسلطنه; 1891–1939), was the last son of Naser al-Din Shah Qajar and princess Turan es-Saltaneh and full brother of Tadj al-Saltaneh.

He studied Military at Theresianum in Austria, with his brother Yamin ed-Dowleh. During Azd es-Saltaneh and Yamin ed-Dowleh's stay in Austria, Franz Joseph I generously received the brothers of the then Mozaffar ad-Din Shah Qajar and several times invited them to his palace.

In 1913, when Mohammad Hassan Mirza lived in Tabriz, Prince Azd es-Saltaneh was the Military commander of Azerbaijan. Ahmad Mirza did not have any children. He died in 1939 and was buried in Qom.
