= Diary of H.M. the Shah of Persia During His Tour Through Europe in A.D. 1873 =

Writings of Naser al-Din Shah across Europe

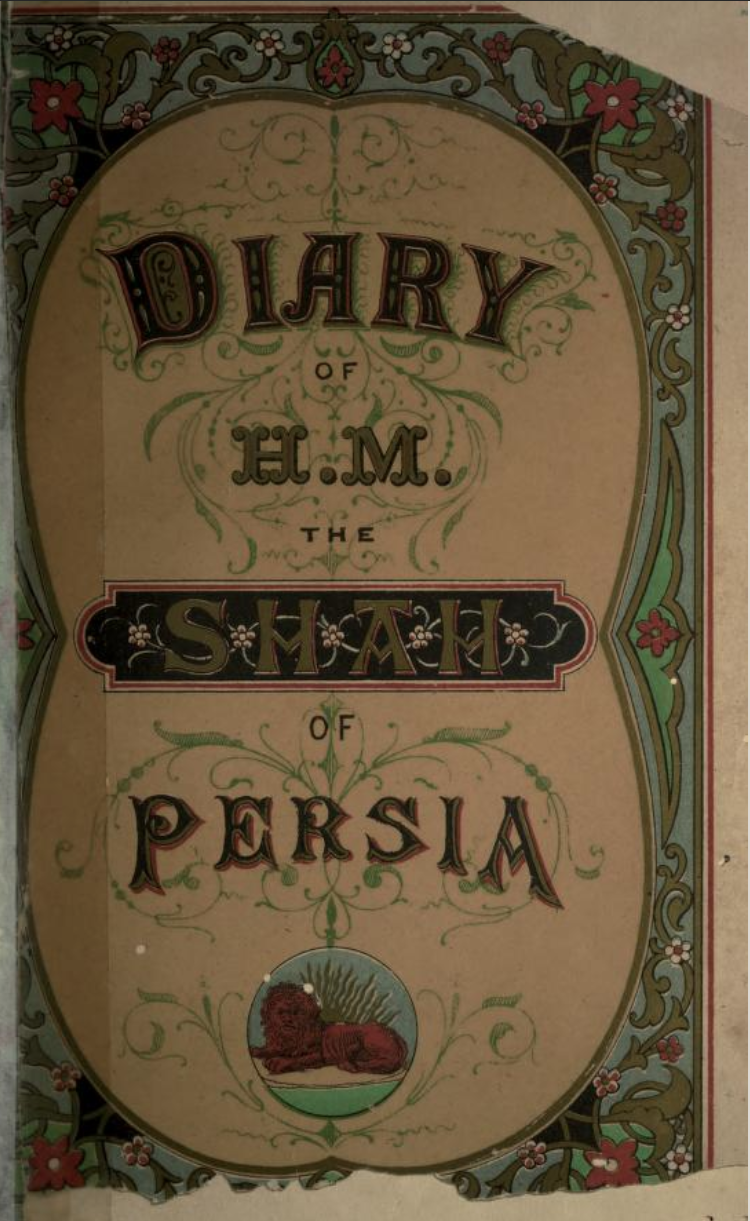
- Author: Naser al-Din Shah The King of Persia
- Original title: Ruznamah-i safar-i Farangistan
- Translator: James Redhouse
- Language: English
- Genre: Travel Book
- Published: London
- Publisher: John Murray
- Publication place: Britain
- English publication date: 1874
- Pages: 427
- OCLC: 29931944

The Diary of H.M. the Shah of Persia During His Tour Through Europe in A.D. 1873 was written by Naser al-Din Shah (1831–1896) while on his tour through the European continent in 1873, during the zenith of European imperialism. The book was translated into English by James Redhouse in 1874. It is the first of three diaries written by Naser al-Din Shah, who was King of Persia from 1848 until 1896, corresponding to his three tours through Europe respectively in 1873, 1878 and 1889. In the 1873 diary, Naser al-Din Shah relates his travel departing from Tehran and he describes his travel through the countries of Russia, Prussia, Germany, Belgium, England, France, Switzerland, Italy, Austria, Turkey and Georgia.

== Bibliographic information and context ==
The Diary of H.M. the Shah of Persia during his tour through Europe in A.D. 1873 was published in Persia in 1874 under its original Farsi name Ruznāmé-ye Safar-e Farangēstān. After the Persian publication of the diary, the Shah sent the book to the European kings and ambassadors. The British government directly decided to translate it into English by Sir James Redhouse, a renowned British linguist (in 1874). Abbreviated version of the English translations of the diary have also been published. Besides, the diary has been translated in German in 1874, and later, in 1998, in French. The diary thus became well-known in Britain and abroad. However, the German translation proved to be a fake one, written by the German novelist Michael Klapp.

In the translation preface of the English translation, Sir James Redhouse states that “On the whole, a more interesting book of the kind can hardly be imagined”. The diary is indeed a significant publication, relating the travel of the first Persian monarch who ever traveled to Europe. Besides, at that time, it was relatively uncommon that a king directly addressed his subjects in a personal account of his travel and that he described how he had been received by foreign monarchs. The fact that the diary has been communicated verbatim before the European countries which had lately received the Shah, was also rather unusual. Accordingly, the Diary of H.M the Shah of Persia is a substantial and compelling piece of work.

== Naser al-Din Shah ==
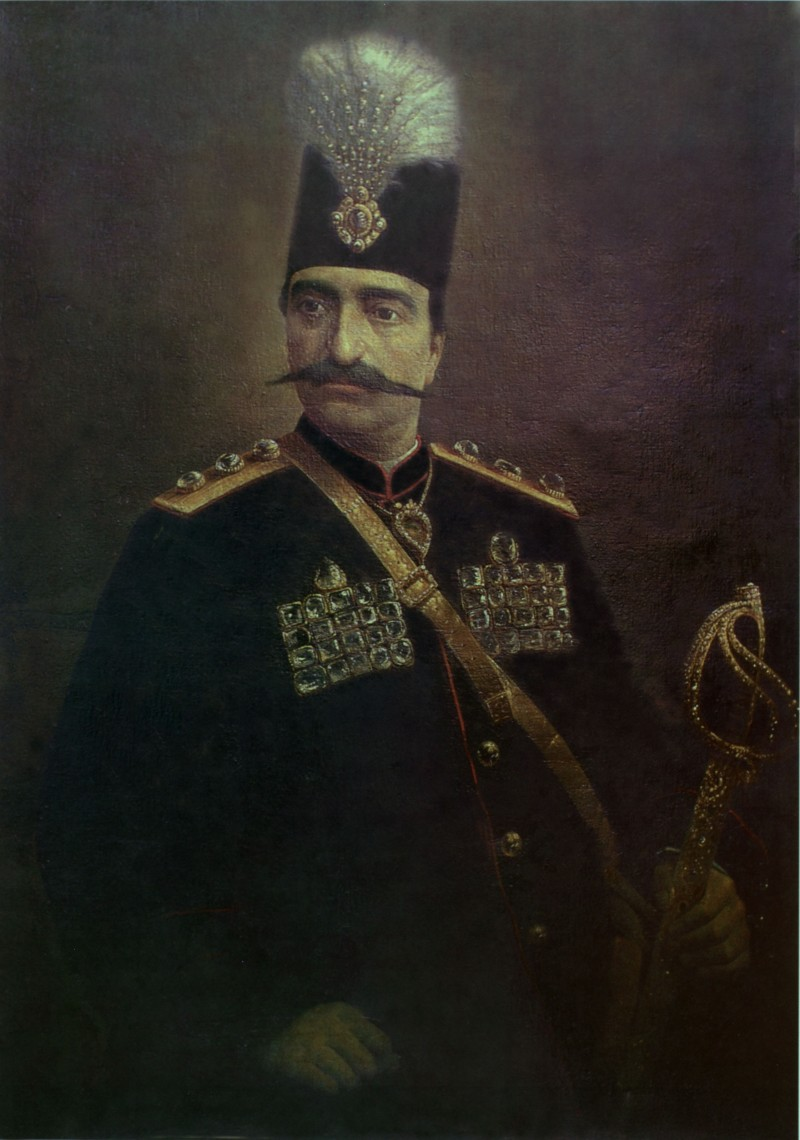
Naser al-Din Shah portrait

Naser al-Din Shah is the first Persian monarch who ever formally visited Europe. None of his predecessors had ever traveled there prior to his journey. Before undertaking his European tour, Naser al-Din Shah had already traveled a lot. He loved travelling and he was eager to learn about new landscapes, monuments, and people. This love of travel might be explained by his education; the Shah had learned French and English. Besides, he has been widely introduced to history and geography, and throughout his life, a great portion of his pastime activities has been filled by his strong interest in those fields. By 1887, the Shah had undertaken twenty-four official trips. Before going to Europe, he had already visited his own dominions extensively.

In 1850, 1851, and 1867, he went to the city of Qum. In April 1867, the Shah visited the province of Khorasan and in January 1870, he visited the province of Gilan. After his long travel to Europe in 1873, he did not stop travelling; he went to the province of Mazandarin in 1875, and to the central provinces of Persia in 1882. The Shah also traveled within the region around Persia. In 1870, he went to Ottoman provinces and to Najaf and to Karbala in Iraq. However, never had he ever put a foot in Europe before 1873. His 1873’s travel through Europe has been followed by two other European tours in 1878 and in 1889, and by two other diaries.

His tour started on the 19th of April 1873 in Tehran and came to an end on the 7th of September 1873. The Shah had been greatly encouraged for many years by Mirza Hussein Khan, his prime minister, for undertaking this European travel. He went there escorted by nearly his entire government, and notably by his favorite wife Anis ud-Dwala during a short part of the journey. While away, the Shah assigned Kamran Mirza, one of his favorite sons, as head of the state, and he bestowed the full powers to his uncle Farhad Mirza.

== Book ==
The diary is written in the first person; the Shah is directly communicating with his readers. He uses a relatively dry style of writing. Indeed, while oriental works of literature are usually written with numerous ornamentations of diction, the diary of the Shah is written in a very simplistic style.

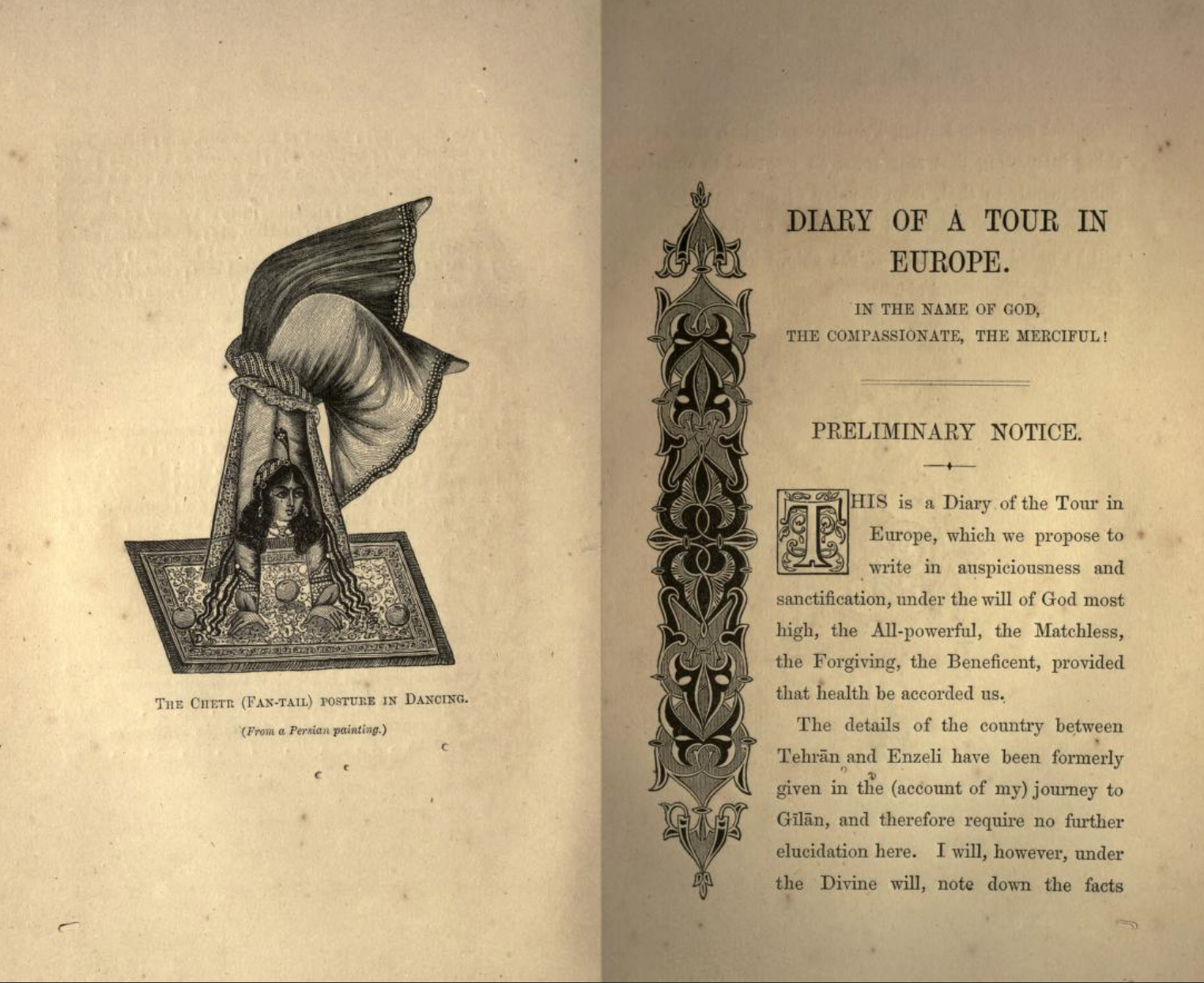
Preview of the Diary of the Shah

The diary is full of passionate and enthusiastic phrases that Naser al-Din Shah uses to express the various feelings that he had when discovering the novelty of European lands. He paid constant attention to the natural scenery, but also to the development of agriculture, commerce or industry and to European mechanical skills. He visited numerous museums, zoos and botanical collections, and he made extensive comments on them in his diary. He also visited many factories, public establishments, hospitals, and schools. He regularly went to the theatre and to the opera. Besides, the Shah notably attended Vienna World's Fair, where Persia had a pavilion of which the Shah was very proud.

On his tour, Naser al-Din Shah met a great number of important officials, monarchs, aristocrats, dignitaries, princes, and notably Queen Victoria and Tsar Nicholas II. Along the diary, he emphasizes the cordiality by which the European monarchs have welcomed him. Private meetings, excursions, balls, and official receptions were indeed organized for him. The Shah thus carefully relates in his diary the numerous parties and sumptuous ceremonies to which he has been formally conveyed and which have been held in his honor.

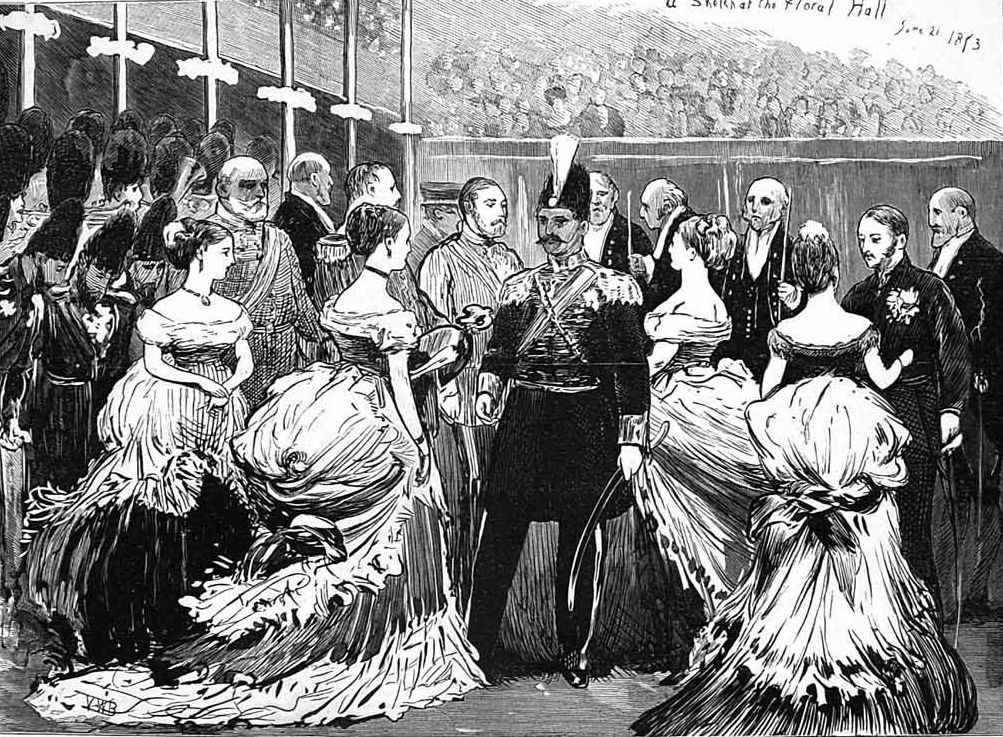
Illustrated London News - 28 June 1873. The Shah at the Italian Royal Opera

The book has been criticized for its extremely lengthy and repetitive descriptions. The diary indeed includes long descriptions of the physiognomy of Europeans and of the background, genealogy or status of the people that the Shah met. The book also contains highly detailed accounts of the cities and of the European landscape. The Shah puts considerable emphasis on the distances between the towns and cities, on the road and on lodging. The book has also been dismissed for its extremely long descriptions of theater, operas, parties, or train travels. In contrast, the diary is entirely void of descriptions of the European economic or political structures. There are only vague and random allusions to diplomatic discussions, and the Shah makes no analyses or introspections. As a consequence, the diary has been considered as being of “little literary value”. Some authors have even asserted that the diary was pointless as a historical document.

The translation of the book by James Redhouse is based on a highly censored version of the diary of the Shah. Less censored versions have been published in the 1990s in Persia. However, these versions have not been translated into English or any European language. These uncensored versions contain many passages that are not part of the book published by the Qajar court in 1874, such as very personal or critical comments about European royalty, descriptions of women, sexual encounters, etc.

== Goal of travel ==
Naser al-Din Shah undertook his European travel for several reasons. Firstly, the Shah went to Europe in order to counteract European countries at the zenith of European imperialism. Indeed, Persians were worried about the potential intervention of the great powers, and notably of Russia with which they nurtured a fragile peace. Indeed, after two Russo-Persian wars, Persia had lost its Caucasian provinces and they were still concerned by Russian intentions towards them. Besides, they had to counteract Russian political influence and balance it with British political influence. The Shah thus traveled through Europe in order to establish ties with the European powers, and especially with Britain and Russia so that they would not impose more political influence on them. He intended to maintain the balance of power and to improve the nature of his relations with the great powers by establishing closer ties with European royal monarchs.

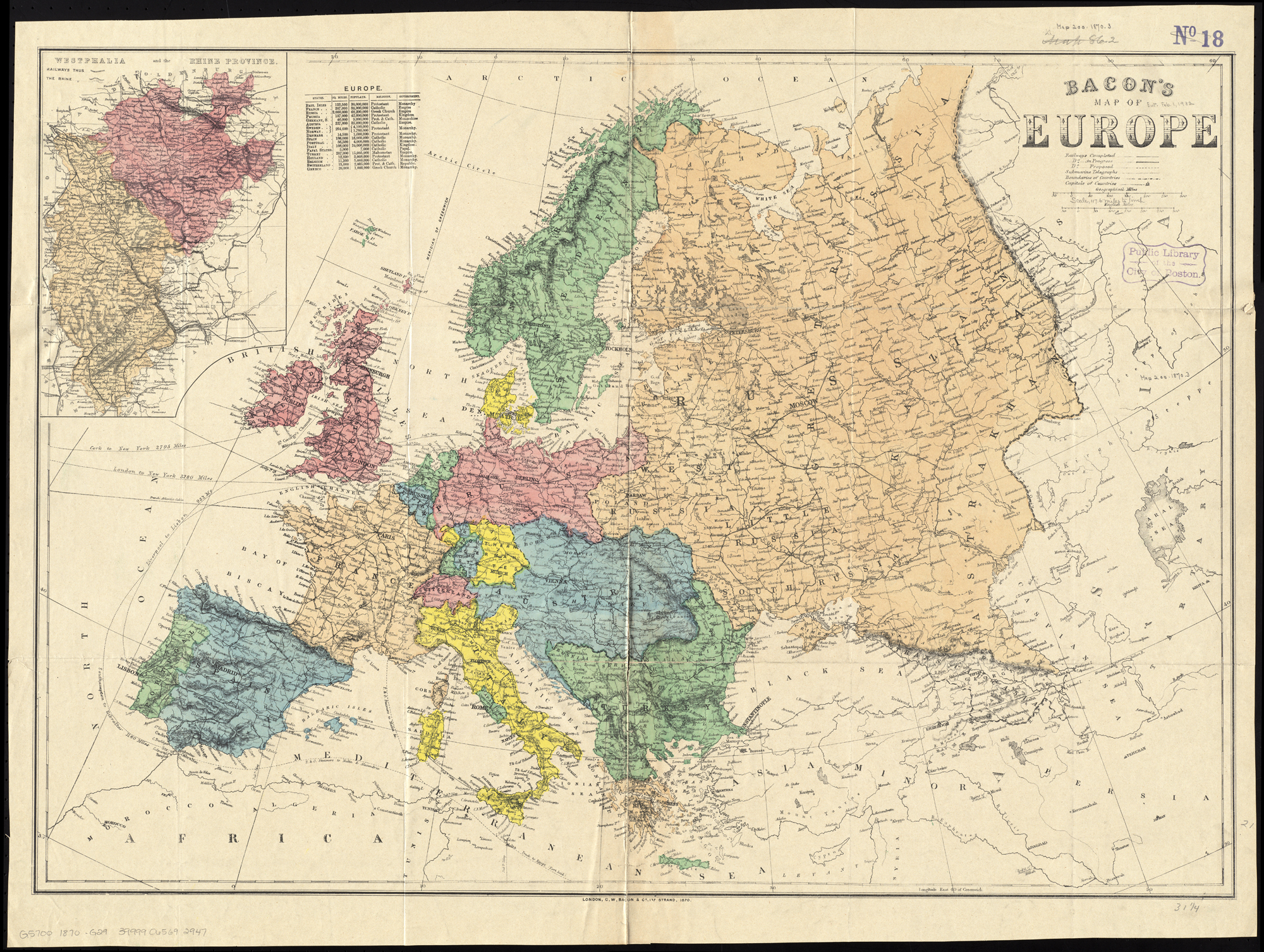
Political boundaries of Europe in c. 1867-1869

Next to political influence, European colonialism also imposed their institutional infrastructures on the non-European countries. Indeed, Europeans considered themselves superior concerning the development of their civilization. Accordingly, they intended to “bring” civilization to the countries that they considered underdeveloped, namely to all the non-European countries. In order to protect the “bringers” of civilization, Europeans developed extraterritoriality, an arrangement which imposed that Europeans be subjected to European laws even outside of Europe. This system obviously breaches the sovereignty of non-European states. The undertaking of the Shah has to be explained in that context; Persia desired to stop this violation. By going to Europe, the Shah intended to discuss with European monarchs and to use diplomacy in order to put an end to extraterritoriality. Accordingly, the travel of the Shah should be understood in the context of self-protection. Besides, to preserve a territorial integrity, the Shah knew that he had to be part of the group of “civilized” states. To that aim, he needed to persuade European states that Persia was a modern state, that he had made many reforms, and that his state had thus arrived or nearly arrived at the same level of civilization than Europeans. He intended to showcase Persia’s accomplishments and its planned projects to coincide with European model of civilization. His aim was thus representational; the Shah needed to present his country positively, and as equally civilized as Europe. The travel of the Shah indeed marked a breakthrough in the relation between Persia and Europe. However, the goal of the Shah has been partially been accomplished since extraterritoriality has not been abolished.

By going to Europe, Naser al-Din Shah also intended to pay attention to the specificities of European civilization and to the factors contributing to their success and superiority. He would then be able to inform the Persian audience and to apply some models and ideas to his country. In an announcement, the Shah expressively asserted that one of the main goal for travelling to Europe was to collect "all information and gathering experiences, which can be valuable for the Persian government and nation". Back home, the Shah indeed tried to improve Persia’s railway and telegraph by taking European railways and telegraph infrastructures as a model. He also initiated several reforms by adapting himself on the model of the modern capitals that he had just visited. Besides, another of the Shah’s major motive for going to Europe was to enlarge the support of European powers for the Reuter concession of 1872, which was an attempt to buy Western material progress. However, this initiative has been met negatively by European powers, and especially by Russia.

The expected results of the tour are to be differentiated from the motives for publishing the diary. It has been advanced that by making his journey readable and by directly communicating with his reader, the Shah intended to strengthen the relationship that he had built with his subjects. Besides, publishing the Shah's travel narrative would also allow him to shape public opinion and the public interpretation of his travel. Nevertheless, it is a topic that lacks academic research. Many researchers have focused on the descriptions of the destinations of the diary while leaving out the reasons that pushed the Shah to publish the accounts of his travel. Naser Al-Din Shah traveled extensively, but he did not publish all his travel accounts. Indeed, while some of his travels have not been published The Diary of H.M. the Shah of Persia contains 427 pages. The reasons that pushed the Shah to publish such a detailed account of his journey is an understudied field. Sohrabi is one of the sole author who has tried to address this issue. He has argued that the three diaries of Naser Al-Din Shah should be considered as state propaganda and diplomacy tools aimed at both the Persian and European public. Nevertheless, specific analyses of the 1873’s diary are lacking.

== Itinerary ==
The diary of H.M. the Shah of Persia is divided into eight chapters. Each chapter corresponds to a part of the Shah's journey. Most of the travel has been made by train or by boat. When the Shah was away, the contents of the diary were transmitted to the Persian public via the Tehran Gazette.

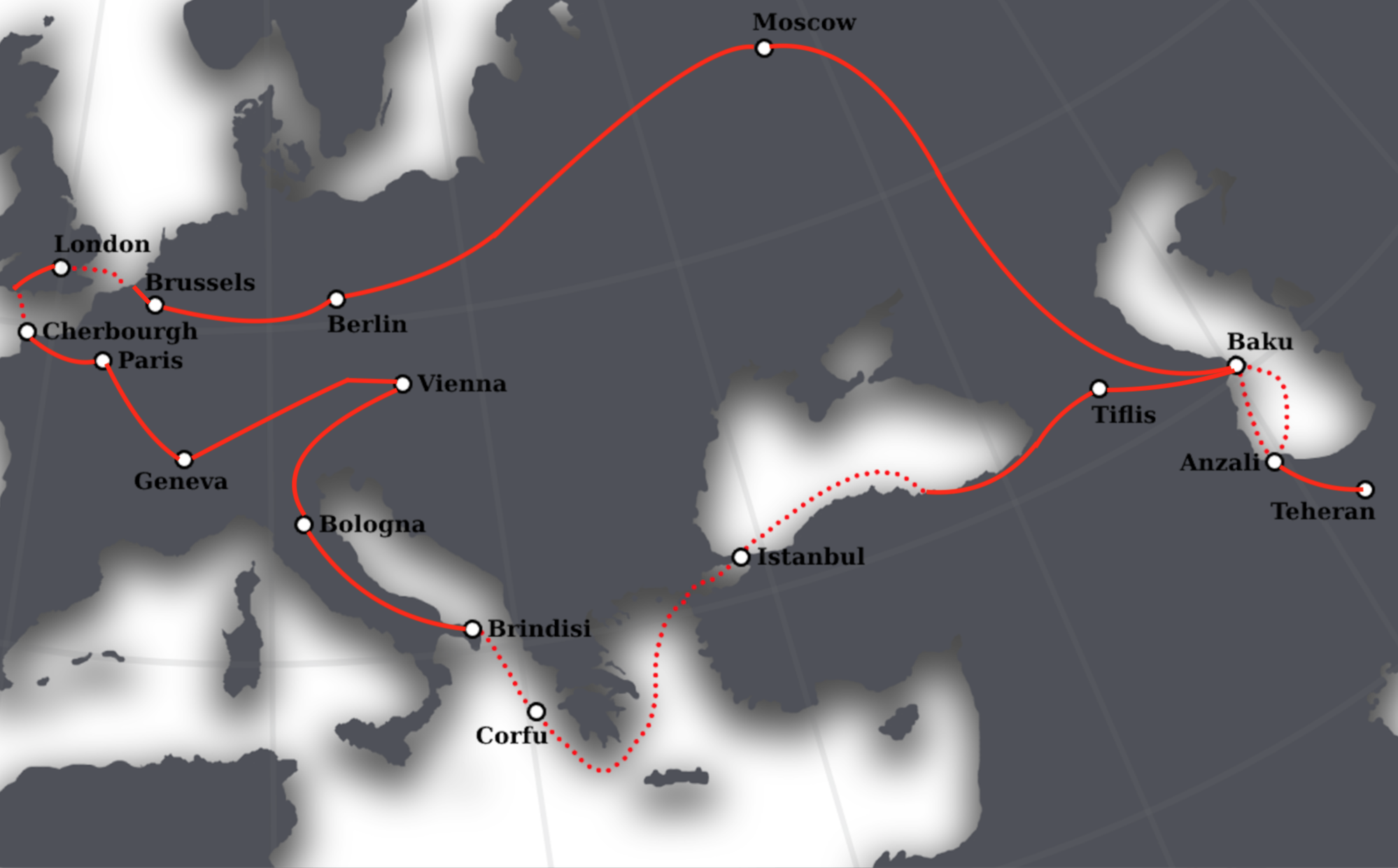
Travel of Naser al Din Shah

In the first chapter, the Shah describes his travel from Tehran to Astrakhan. He departed from Tehran and then traveled to Qazwin, to Rasht, and to the port of Enzeli. From there, he embarked for Astrakhan. It took him 26 days.

In the second chapter, the Shah describes his stay in Russia. He stayed there 14 days. He visited Astrakhan and then left by water for Tsaritsin. From there, he went to Moscow. His last step was St. Petersburgh. With Britain, Russia was one of the two main destination of Naser al Din Shah's tour. Indeed, due to the Reuter concession of 1872 which had affected the Anglo-Russian balance in Persia, Russia needed to be appeased.

The third chapter concerns Prussia, Germany, and Belgium, where the Shah stayed 20 days. The Shah left for Prussia and then reached Berlin. From there, he went to the Rhine Country, and notably to Cologne and Aix-la Chapelle. Germany was an important step considering the military might of the country. The next step was Belgium, in which the Shah visited Spa, Liège and Brussels.

Chapter four is devoted to England, where the Shah stayed during 18 days. There, the Shah notably visited London, Crewe Works, Liverpool, Manchester, Richmond, and Westminster. Then, he reached Portsmouth from where he embarked on "Rapide", a French boat which conducted him to French lands. Britain, on the same level than Russia, was an important destination for the Shah who sought for more governmental support for the Reuter Concession. Besides, the technological and military superiority of Britain also notably appealed to the Shah. Incidentally, The Illustrated London News and The Times related extensive descriptions of the Shah's journey as well as basic information about Persia. They also contained illustrations of the tour of Naser al Din Shah.

Chapter five concerns France and Switzerland, where the Shah stayed 19 days. He visited many French cities such as Cherbourg, Caen, Paris, Versailles, and Dijon. Then, he traveled to Switzerland and visited Geneva and Vevey. After that, the Shah went to France again, and he visited Aix-les-Bains, Chambery, and Modane.

Chapter six relates the travel of the Shah in Italy and in Austria during 19 days. In Italy, the Shah visited Turin, Milan, Peschiera, Verona and Ala. In Austria, he went to Franzansvest, Rosenheim, Trautenstein, Saltzburg, Laxenburg, Vienna, Innsbruck, Schelleberg and Gossensasse. Then, the Shah went to Italy again, through the cities of Ala, Verona, Bologna, Rimini, Ancona. After that, he passed next to Greek islands such as Corfu, Cephanlonia, Zante, Navarino, Cerigo, Negropont, Andros, Psara, and Scio.

Chapter seven is about Turkey. The Shah stayed there 11 days and he passed through Dardanelles, Gallipoli, Istanbul, and Trebizond.

In Chapter eight, the Shah relates his return travel from Georgia until Enzeli. He went through the cities of Poti, Kutaïs, Tiflis, Baku, Ganja, Shamakhi, and then finally arrived at Enzeli, in Persia.
