= Taj al-Dawlah =

Iranian royal consort

Taj al-Dawlah تاج‌الدوله
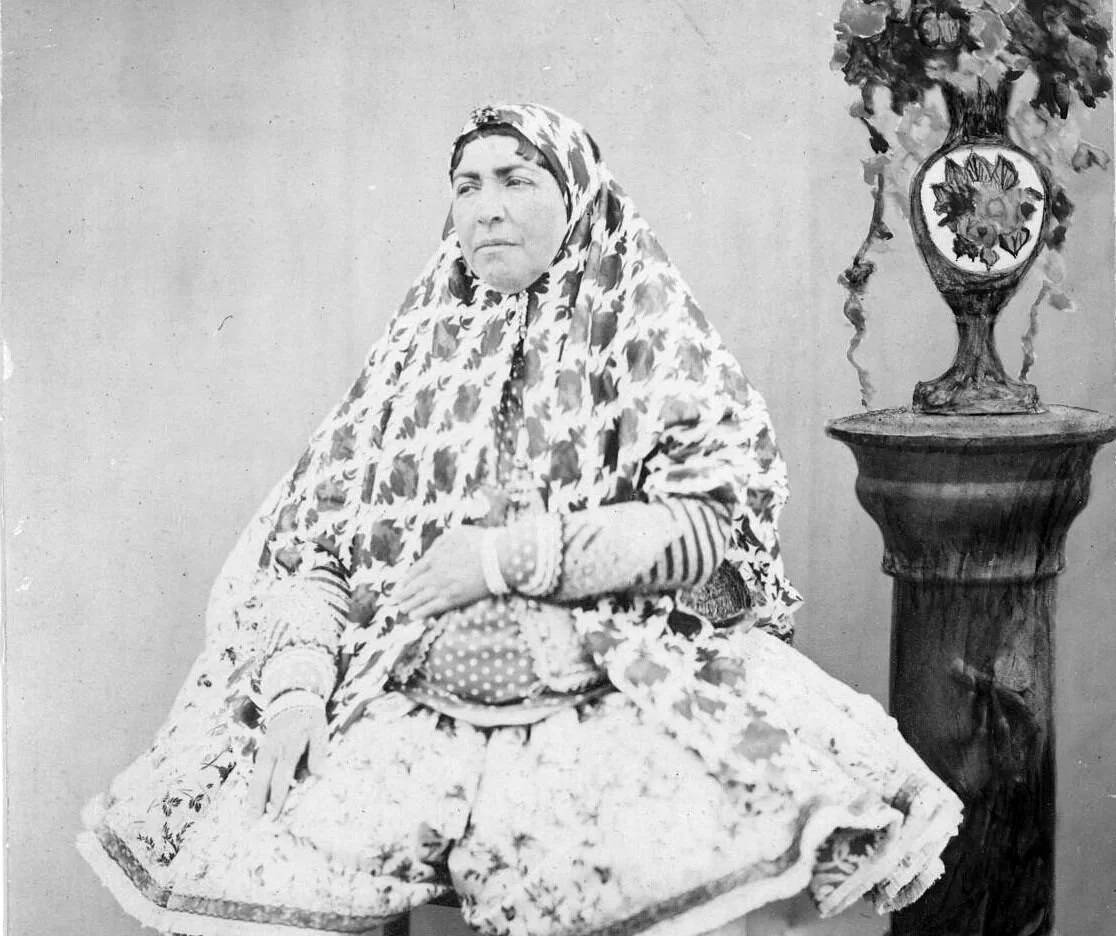

wife of the Qajar Shah (mother of the former Crown Prince)
- Born: Khojasta Jahanbani
- Spouses: Naser al-Din Shah Qajar unknown
- Issue: Moin ad-Din Mirza; Ismat al-Doulah
- House: Qajar
- Father: Seyfollah Mirza Jahanbani
- Religion: Shia Islam

Taj al-Dawlah (Persian: تاج‌الدوله), born as Khojasta Jahanbani, was a member of the Qajar dynasty, royal consort and wife of Naser al-Din Shah Qajar of Iran.

She, possibly born 1834/1833, was the daughter of Prince Seyfollah Mirza Jahanbani. Naser al-Din Shah's second legal and permanent wife, she was the mother of Prince Moin ad-Din Mirza, heir to the throne until his death at the age of 7, as well as Princess Ismat al-Doulah.

She got selected and proposed by the royal family high-ranks in 1848 to marry the new Shah of Iran, who was also considered her distant cousin, just months after his ascension to the throne in Tehran. She was the first ever permanent wife Naser al-Din Shah married after he became the monarch, (having already another wife, Galin Khatun, whom he married to when he still was a prince).

After Naser al-Din Shah's assassination and reformation of the Qajar harem in 1896 when she was in her 60s, she left the palace and remarried.

== Mother of Moinaddin Mirza ==
She gave Naser al-Din Shah a son, Prince Moin. However, there already was an elder son, Mahmoud Mirza, son of Galin Khatun who was also the crown prince at the time.

As Mahmoud died in early 1852, meaning that Moin was the next prince in line since he was the eldest legitimate surviving now, Taj al-Dawlah's efforts and protection led to him being named the crown prince in 1853 during an official ceremony with statesmen and ambassadors being present as expected. Taj al-Dawlah's relationship and closeness with the Shah is said to have been partially affected because of the presence of Shah's mistress, Jeyran; meaning that her being the mother of the heir didn't necessarily guarantee ultimate influence as one of the Shah's consorts and over the Shah himself. Although she's said to still have been highly respected by the Shah and supported by his mother.

Moin remained the crown prince for close to 4 years, until he died in October 1856, at the exact same night in which Naser al-Din Shah received the news of Herat being successfully occupied by Qajar troops.

== Later life ==
Taj al-Dawlah spent a time of relative stillness and did not interfere in political and throne matters after Moin's death as much as before. After her son's death, she gave birth to a daughter, Princess Ismat al-Doulah. She dedicated her time raising her, as well as being a companion to the Shah's mother, Mahd-e Olia.

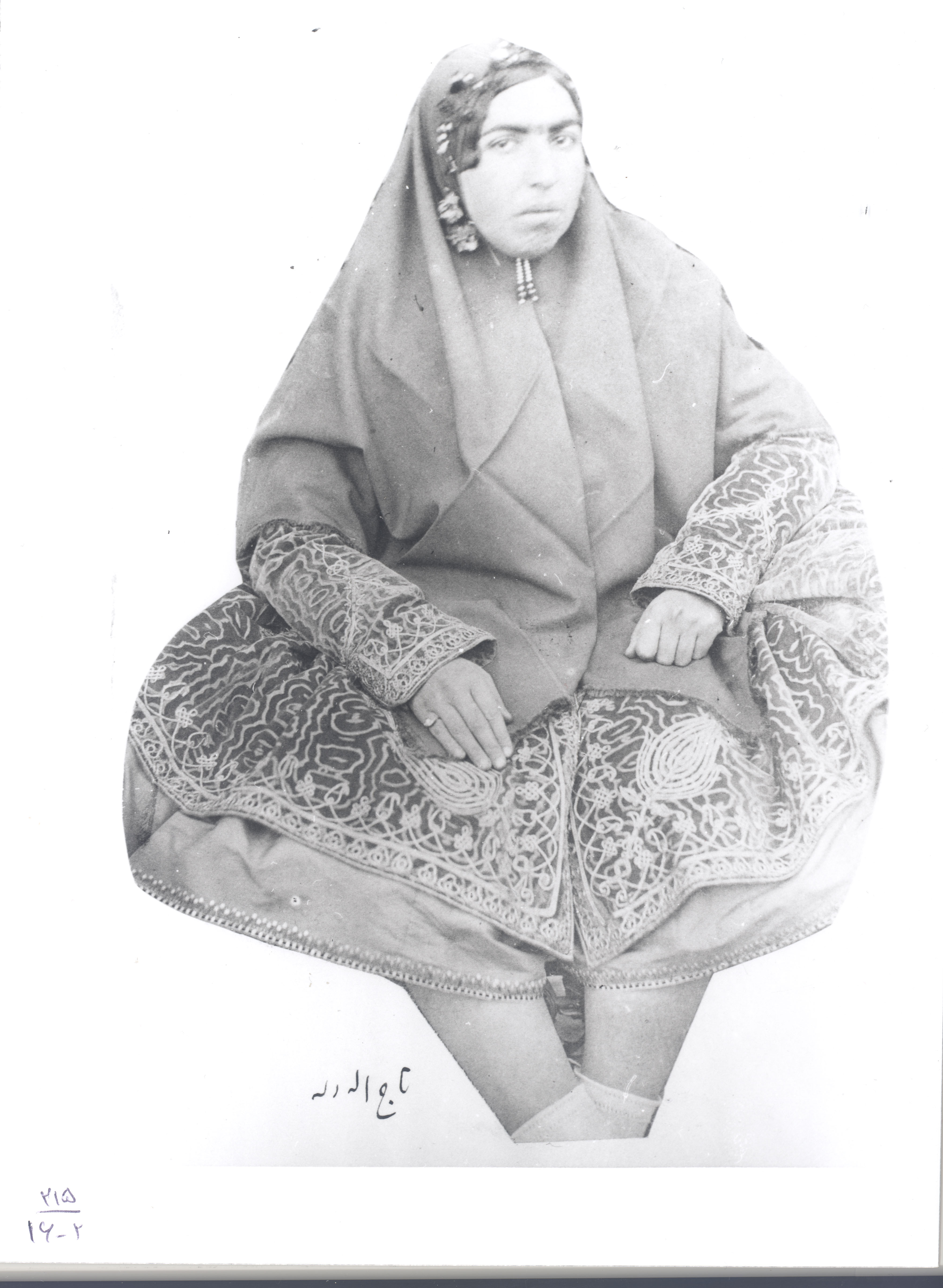
Taj al-Dawlah, c. 1867

She also raised and took care of two of Naser al-Din Shah's other children who had lost their mother, for them to grow and marry.

She ended up remarrying to a wealthy noble man after Naser al-Din Shah's assassination in 1896. She died some time after her daughter's death in 1905.

== Popular culture ==
She's portrayed by Rana Azadivar in the Iranian 2022 show Jeyran, a historical drama-fiction.
