= Khalvat-e Karim Khani =

- خلوت کریم‌خانی (Persian)
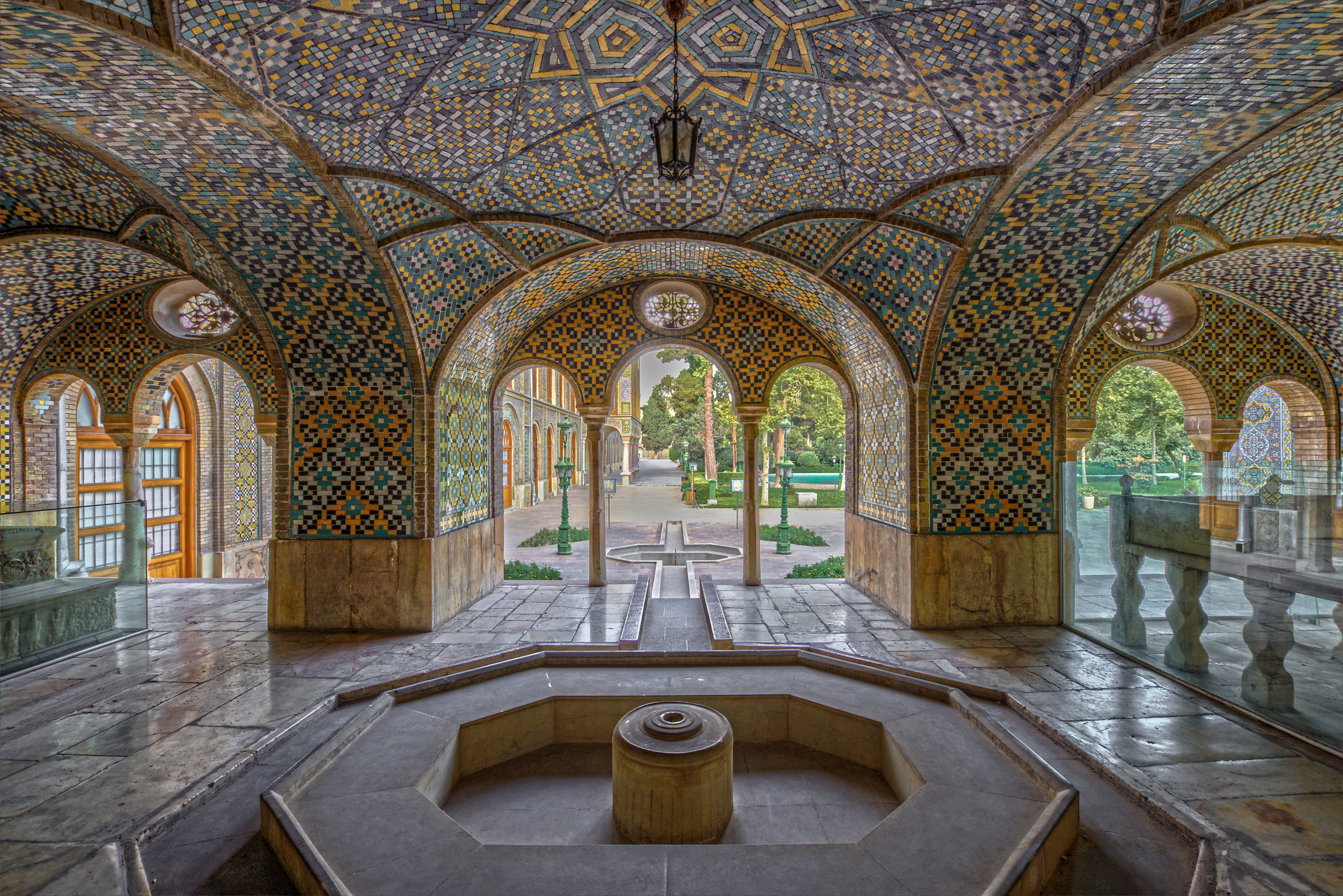
- Interactive map of Khalvat-e Karim Khani
- Location: Golestan Palace, Tehran, Iran

Khalvat-e Karim Khani (Persian: خلوت کریم‌خانی, lit. 'Karim Khan's Retreat') is a historical building located on the northwestern corner of Golestan Palace in Tehran. It is situated between Salam Hall and Takht-e Marmar Iwan.

== History ==
As its name suggests, the foundation of Khalvat-e Karim Khani was ordered by Karim Khan (r. 1751–1779) of Zand dynasty. The building's first function was being passageway between exterior (biruni) and interior (andaruni) of Golestan Palace. When Agha Mohammad Khan Qajar (r. 1789–1797) rose to power, he ordered his former rival's tomb in Shiraz exhumed; The remaining bones of Karim Khan were buried under the steps of Khalvat, as a bitter revenge act.

During the reign Naser al-Din Shah Qajar (r. 1848–1896) due to the security issues of his large harem, the passageway of Khalvat was blocked; it became a roofed portico, looking east on one side to a small rose garden.

In 1967, because of the coronation ceremony of Mohammad Reza Pahlavi (r. 1941–1979), the derelict building on the south side of Khalvat was demolished, thus, Golestan Palace's separate gardens became unified. Moreover, a south-facing façade with a similar style to that of the eastside was built for Khalvat and it became open on its two sides.

Naser al-Din Shah's tombstone

While on a pilgrim visit to Shah Abdol-Azim Shrine in Ray, Naser al-Din Shah was assassinated by Mirza Reza Kermani (1 May 1896). The Shah's corpse was brought to Takyeh Dowlat and left there until his own shrine was ready to bury him. He was buried just some meters away from the place he was shot. After four years, an ornate sarcophagus made of white marble was finally ready to be transported from Yazd. Until the 1979 Iranian Revolution, Naser al-Din Shah's tomb was intact; during the revolutionary events, the tombstone was miraculously saved from being demolished. In the 1990s, when Golestan Palace was reopened to the public as a museum, the sarcophagus was transported to Khalvat-e Karim Khani.

Fath-Ali Shah's Takht

During the reign of Fath-Ali Shah Qajar, a large takht (throne) made of marble and wood was built. Its place was changed many times; when Takyeh Dowlat was built, the takht was installed in one of its alcoves. Naser al-Din Shah's corpse was kept on this takht, until the construction of his shrine was done. The takht also served the same for the corpse of Mozaffar ad-Din Shah Qajar. After the demolition of Takye Dowlat in 1946, Fath-Ali Shah's Takht was finally placed at its current location.

== Gallery ==
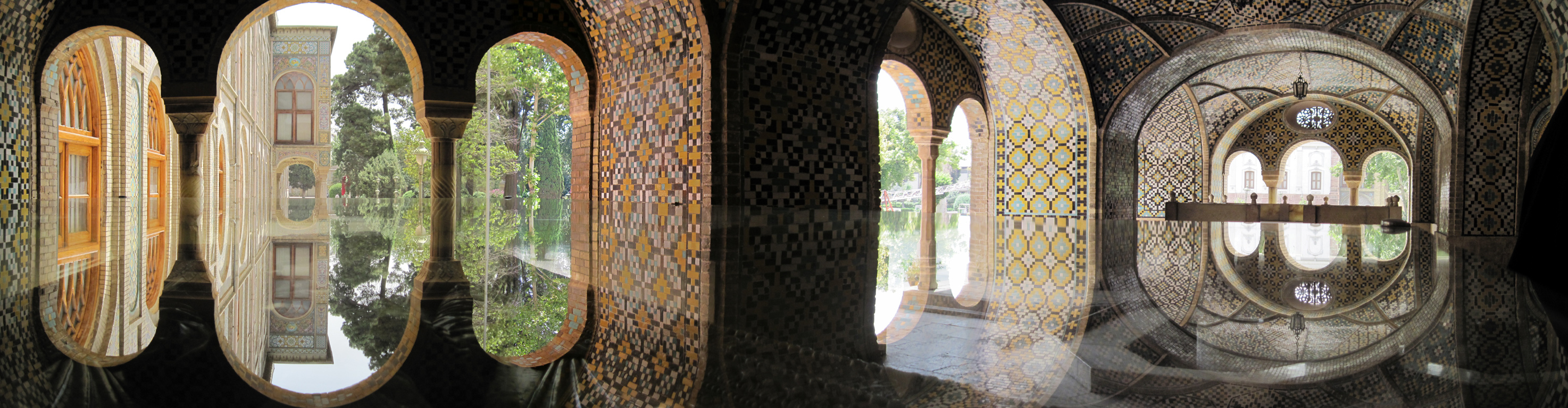
Panorama of Khalvat-e Karim Khani

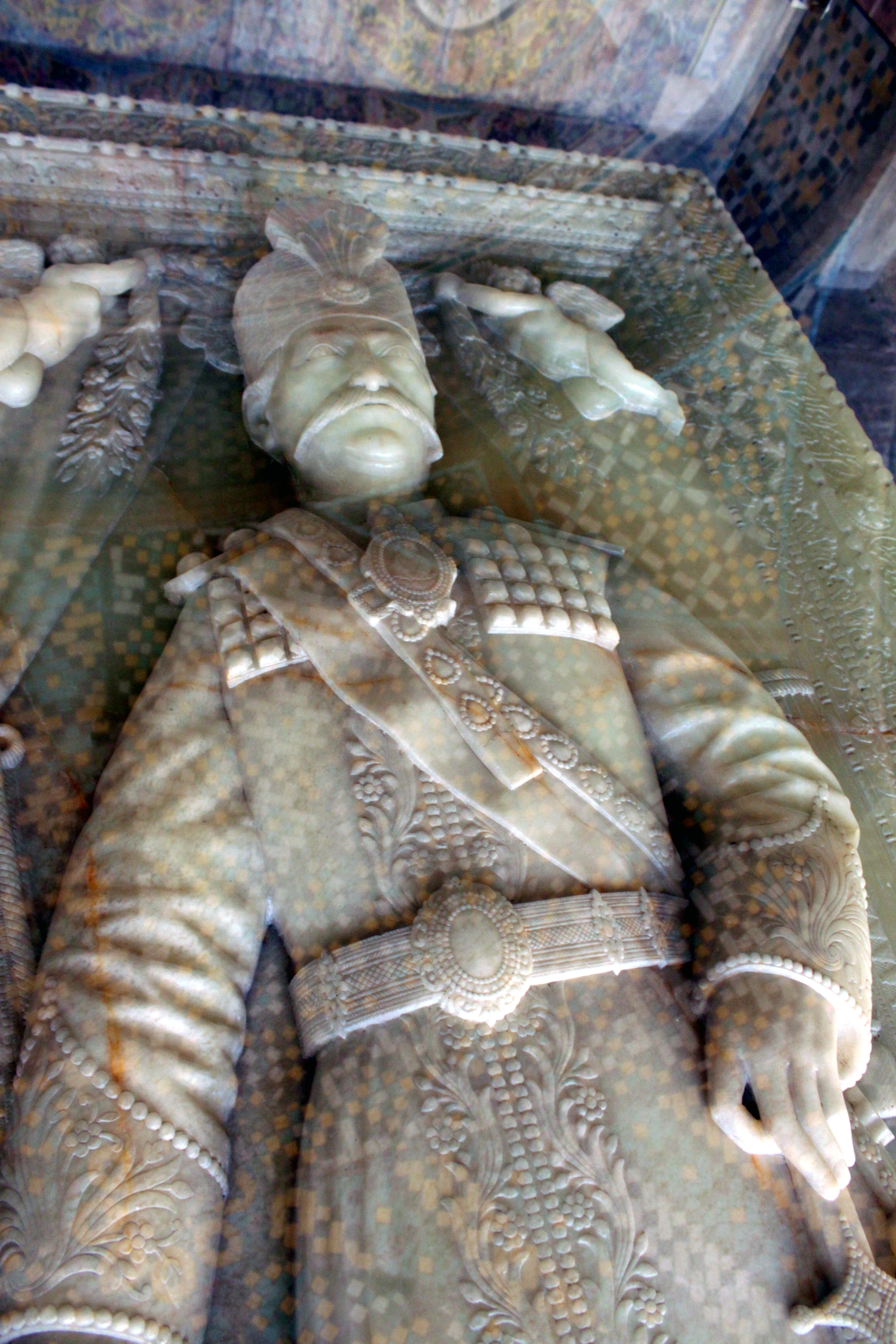
Detail shot in Golestan Palace

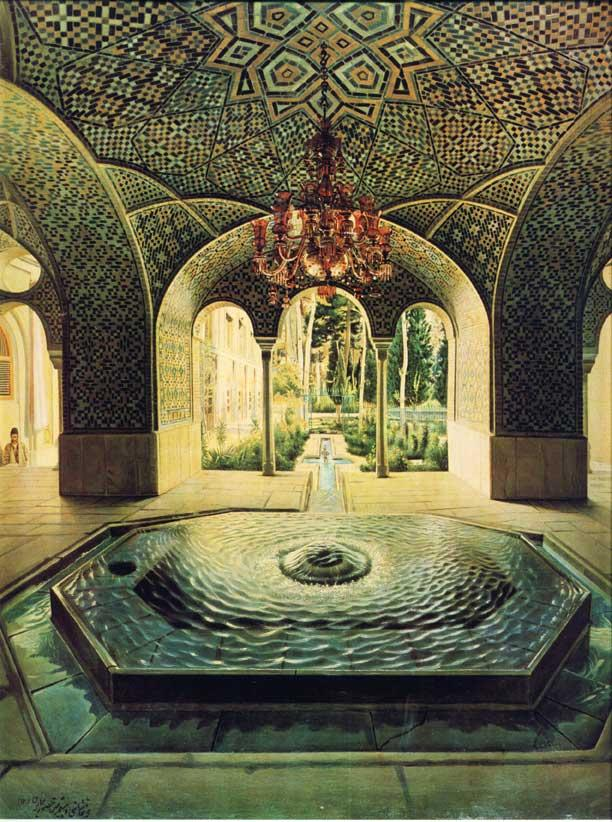
Royal Spring (Cheshme-ye Shahi), by Kamal-ol-molk, 1889
