= Naser al-Din Shah Qajar =

Shah of Iran from 1848 to 1896

Naser al-Din Shah Qajar ناصرالدین شاه قاجار
- Shahanshah of Iran; Zell'ollah (Shadow of God [on earth]); Qebleh-ye 'ālam (Pivot of the Universe); Islampanah (Refuge of Islam)
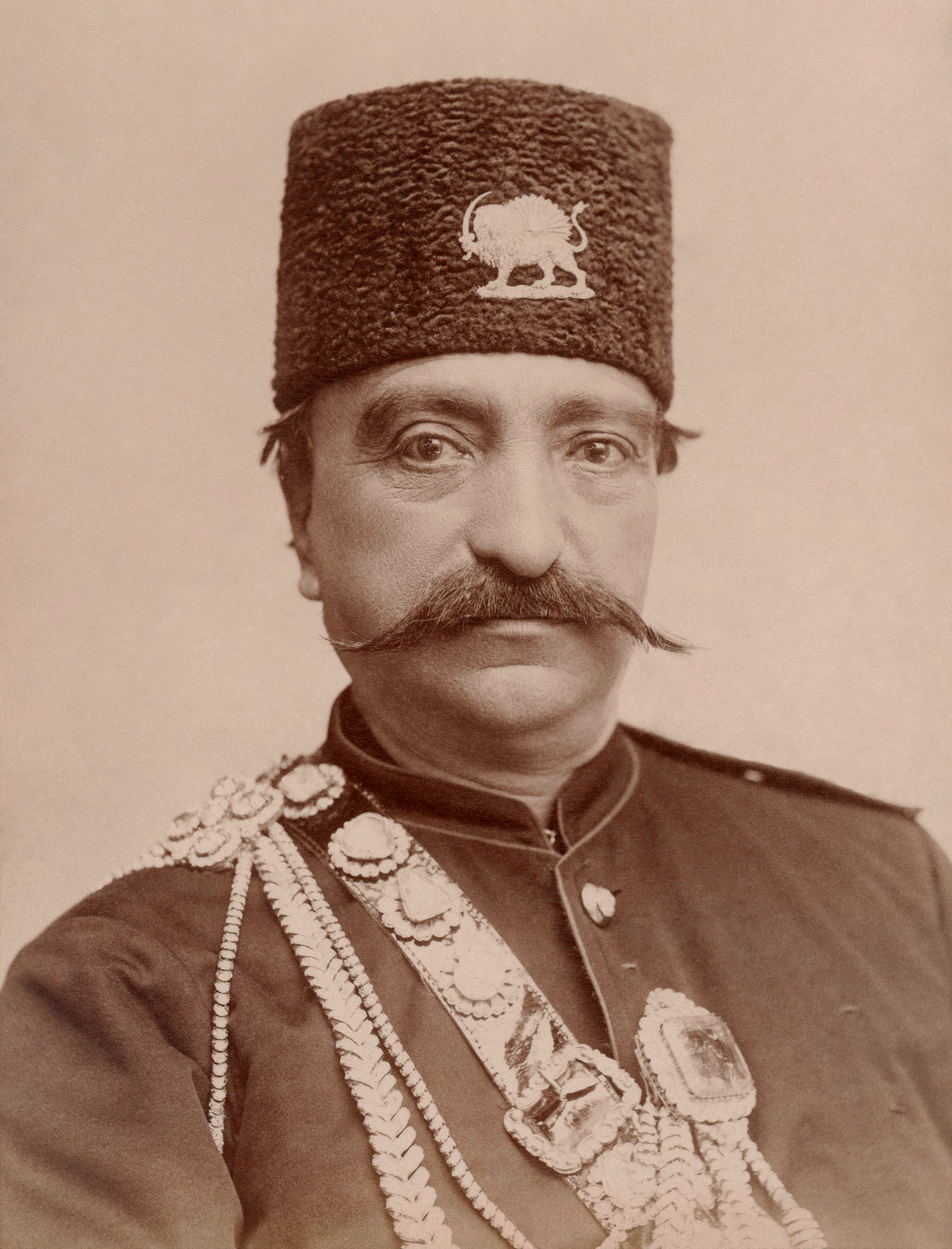
- Portrait by Nadar, 1889

Shah of Iran
- Reign: 5 September 1848 – 1 May 1896
- Coronation: October 20 1848
- Predecessor: Mohammad Shah Qajar
- Successor: Mozaffar ad-Din Shah Qajar
- Regent: Malek Jahan Khanom
- Premiers: See list: Amir Kabir; Mirza Aqa Khan Nuri; Mirza Hussein Khan; Yusof Ashtiani; Mirza Ali Asghar Khan
- Born: Naser al-Din Mirza; 17 July 1831; Kahnamu, Qajar Iran
- Died: 1 May 1896 (aged 64); Tehran, Qajar Iran
- Burial: Shah-Abdol-Azim shrine
- Spouse: See below
- Issue: See below
Names
- Naser al-Din Shah ناصرالدین‌شاه
- Dynasty: Qajar
- Father: Mohammad Shah Qajar
- Mother: Malek Jahan Khanom
- Religion: Shia Islam
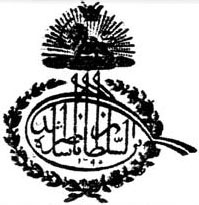
- Tughra

Naser al-Din or Naseroddin Shah Qajar (Persian: ناصرالدین‌شاه قاجار, romanized: Nâseroddin Shâh Qâjâr, pronounced [nɒːˈseɹ odˈdiːn ˈʃɒːhe qɒːˈdʒɒːɹ]; 17 July 1831 – 1 May 1896) was the fourth Shah of Qajar Iran from 5 September 1848 to 1 May 1896 when he was assassinated. Initially seeking to modernise Iran, his style of governance became more dictatorial over the course of his reign. His reign saw the Second Herat War (1856), the subsequent Anglo-Persian War (1857) and internal unrest, Tobacco Protest (1890-1891).

He allowed the establishment of newspapers in the country and made use of modern forms of technology such as telegraph, photography and also planned concessions for railways and irrigation works. Despite his modernising reforms on education, his tax reforms were abused by people in power, and the government was viewed as corrupt and unable to protect commoners from abuse by the upper classes which led to increasing anti-governmental sentiments. He was assassinated at Shah Abdol-Azim Shrine in Rey near Tehran. He was the first modern Iranian monarch who formally visited Europe and wrote of his travels in his memoirs. He was the son of Mohammad Shah Qajar and Malek Jahan Khanom and the third longest reigning monarch in Iranian history after Shapur II of the Sasanian dynasty and Tahmasp I of the Safavid dynasty. Naser al-Din Shah had sovereign power for close to 48 years.

== Early life ==
Portrait of Naser al-Din Mirza

Naser al-Din Mirza was born on 17 July 1831 in Kahnamu, a village near Tabriz, as the third child of Mohammad Mirza (later Mohammad Shah) and his wife, Malek Jahan Khanom, the Qajar princess by both birth and marriage. Crown prince Abbas Mirza died in Mashhad on 25 October 1833, as a result of poor health. Fath-Ali Shah died the following year; his successor Mohammad Mirza assumed the regnal name of Mohammad Shah Qajar. In 1835, Naser al-Din Mirza, then four years old, was appointed Crown prince and given the governorship of Azerbaijan.

=== Governorship of Azerbaijan ===
Mohammad Shah given own brother Qahraman Mirza as regent to Naser al-Din Mirza during his governorship in Azerbaijan, but Qahraman Mirza died in 1839, and Mohammad Shah appointed his last-surviving full-brother, Bahman Mirza as Naser al-Din's regent in 1842.

Mohammad Shah's dire health at the time prompted the foreign powers to declare their support for Naser al-Din Mirza in February 1842.

Bahman Mirza began mobilising forces at Tabriz, in hopes of becoming Naser al-Din's regent once again after Mohammad Shah's death.

To counteract the Russians, in 1845 Aqasi arranged a marriage between Naser al-Din Mirza and the daughter of Ahmad Ali Mirza. This wedding brought the young prince into the political spectrum. Mohammad Shah's health slightly improved, and the realm and its succession seemed stable and secure.

On 4 September 1848, Mohammad Shah died and was buried at the Fatima Masumeh Shrine located in Qom.

== Reign ==
=== Effectiveness of his early rule ===
The state under Naser was the recognized government of Iran, but its authority was undermined by local tribal leaders due to the lack of a standing army. The army was weakened by wars with Russia in the Treaty of Gulistan (1813) and Turkmenchay (1828) The religious and tribal chieftains held quite a bit of autonomy over their communities. Naser was not effective in implementing his sovereignty over his people. Local groups had their own militias and oftentimes did not obey laws passed by the monarchy, since it did not have the power to enforce them. The people followed the ulama's fatwas instead of state-issued laws. When Naser took power, his army barely had 3,000 men which was significantly smaller than the armies under various tribal leaders. When the state needed a proper army, he would hire the local militias. Prior to his reforms, Naser's government had very little power over their subjects and even during the reforms, they faced more scrutiny over their ability to implement those reforms successfully.

=== Accession and Diplomacy ===
Portrait of Naser al-Din Shah, dated 1849

Naser al-Din Mirza was in Tabriz when he heard of his father's death in 1848, and he ascended to the Sun Throne with the help of Amir Kabir. After his arrival now as Naser al-Din Shah, his mother Malek Jahan Khanom became known as Mahd-e Olya, and became most powerful figure at court. She immediately asked Farhad Mirza to arrest and blind Naser al-Din Shah's younger half-brother, Abbas Mirza Molk-Ara, whom she considered a potential source of trouble. Farhad Mirza found out about the plan. On August 1852 in Shemiran, followers of the Báb attempted to assassinate Naser al-Din Shah, after the incident thousands of Bábis were killed, this was in reaction to a assassination attempt. This treatment continued under his prime minister Amir Kabir, who even ordered the execution of the Báb. In same time Farhad Mirza's enemies implicated him in the Bábi attempt on Naser al-Din Shah's life. As punishment, Farhad Mirza was ordered into house arrest at Taleqan.

In same time, Mahd-e Olya, Mirza Aqa Khan Nuri and Mirza Yusuf Ashtiani, formed coalition against Amir Kabir. As the adolescent Naser al-Din Shah began to exert his own independence in government, he was strongly influenced by the Mahd-e Olya. Through her influence, Amir Kabir was demoted solely to the chief of the army and replaced by Nuri as the Grand vizier. Soon Amir Kabir exiled to Kashan, where after forty days, on 10 January 1852 he was executed in Fin Garden by the order of Shah. Amir Kabir was executed by Ali Khan Maragha'i, which entered to government service as a protégé of Amir Kabir.

=== Foreign policy during the Crimean War ===
Naser al-Din Shah around 1850s, by Luigi Pesce

With the outbreak of Crimean War in 1853, Aqa Khan Nuri initially opposed the idea of an alliance with Russian Empire. However, Aqa Khan's decidedly pro-British sentiments subsided because of tension with Justin Sheil, Aqa Khan was also pressed by the Naser al-Din Shah to respond positively to a new Russian overture for the conclusion of an alliance. In secret negotiations, the new Russian envoy, A. H. Anitchkov, promised financial benefits and military aid in exchange for an alliance against the Ottoman empire and its allies, Britain and France. Signed in September 1854, the treaty stipulated that in exchange for Iran withholding assistance to the Ottomans and their allies and for prohibiting the Ottomans from using Iranian soil for military action, Russia would agree to relieve Persia of the balance of the war reparations required under the terms of the Treaty of Turkmenchay. However, Mirza Aqa Khan were able, or inclined to embrace a pro-Russian policy. Both the army led by Aziz Khan Mokri to the Iranain-Ottoman border at Azerbaijan, and the army sent to the border at Kermanshah, were unsuccessful.

=== Prelude of Second Herat War ===
With the death of Kohan Dil Khan in 1855, Emir of Kabul, Dost Mohammad Khan mobilised to seize Kandahar, capturing the city on 14 November 1855. Dost Mohammad Khan had made Tehran increasingly nervous about his intentions. Given the political dynamic in Afghanistan, Naser al-Din Shah issued a royal order to begin troop mobilisation across five provinces in December 1855. Mirza Malkam Khan's unequivocal call for the conquest of Herat was central to reaffirming the Shah's ambitions. Iran's strategic approach for Herat was also shaped by foreign minister Mirza Saeed Khan, Farrokh Khan, and Nicolas Bourre, the French envoy in Tehran.

=== Second Herat War ===
In 1856, Naser ad-Din Shah launched the Second Herat War to reassert Qajar suzerainty over Herat, a strategically vital city state in western Afghanistan that Iran had long claimed as part of its historic sphere. Persian forces under Naser's uncle, Hesam o-Saltaneh captured Herat in October 1856 after a nine-month siege, deposing the local ruler and installing a pro-Iranian governor. This success alarmed Britain, which considered Herat the “gate of India” and feared Persian (and potentially Russian) expansion toward its Indian empire. Britain declared war on Iran in November 1856 (the Anglo-Persian War), but the Persian occupation of Herat itself represented a clear military and political victory for Naser ad-Din Shah, temporarily restoring Iranian control over a region lost since the mid-1700s.

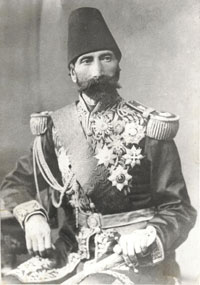
Hassan Ali Khan Amir Nezam Garrusi received the title of Generalissimo by the Shah after commanding the Persian forces to siege Ghorian during the Second Herat War.

On 2 November 1856, at four in the afternoon, the Shah was sitting in the Mirror Hall of the outer court of the Golestan Palace, next to the Crystal Fountain. His servant in waiting, Yadullah Khan, brought news of the successful conquest in Herat, for which he was gifted with a thousand tomans. In the margin of a Persian translation of Louis de Bourrienne's Memoirs of Napoleon Bonaparte, the Shah wrote:

Thanks to Murtaza 'Ali's blessings, peace be upon him, this was a praiseworthy victory and the eyes of the enemy, particularly the British, turned blind [with jealousy]. Hundred and ten gun salutes were fired in honor of his holiness 'Ali.

— Naser al-Din Shah

The Qajar court announced a public levee in honor of the occasion, during which the court chronicler recited the official records of the conquest as ascribed to Hesam o-Saltaneh. The document lists the administrative decisions taken in the aftermath of Herat's capture. In a symbolic move, the Shah's name was mentioned in the Friday sermon and the Shia adhan became the call to prayer. Similarly, the mint struck coins in Naser ad-Din Shah's name. A public holiday was soon declared and a national booklet outlining the conquest was disseminated.

=== Anglo-Persian war ===
With the taking herat and violation of an existing Anglo-Persian Treaty signed in 1801, British governor-general in India, acting on orders from London, declared war on 1 November. British forces subsequently landed at Bushehr in December, opening a military campaign against Iran. The conflict continued until the signing of the Treaty of Paris on 4 March 1857, under which Iran agreed to withdraw from Herat and renounce its claims over the city.

In 1858, Naser al-Din Shah dismissed Mirza Aqa Khan Nuri from the premiership, but nuri was spared execution because Naser al-Din Shah had signed a royal pledge prior to his appointment promising that his life would be protected. Nuri was subsequently exiled, spending periods in Varamin, Arak, Yazd, and Isfahan, before eventually being settled in Qom. With the dismissal, Naser al-Din Shah abolished the office of Grand vizier and established Council of state, and appointed Jafar Khan Moshir od-Dowleh as head of the council. Council included eleven members composed of princes, ministers and high-ranking officials, after 1859, Consultative Assembly, composed of twenty-six officials and administrators.

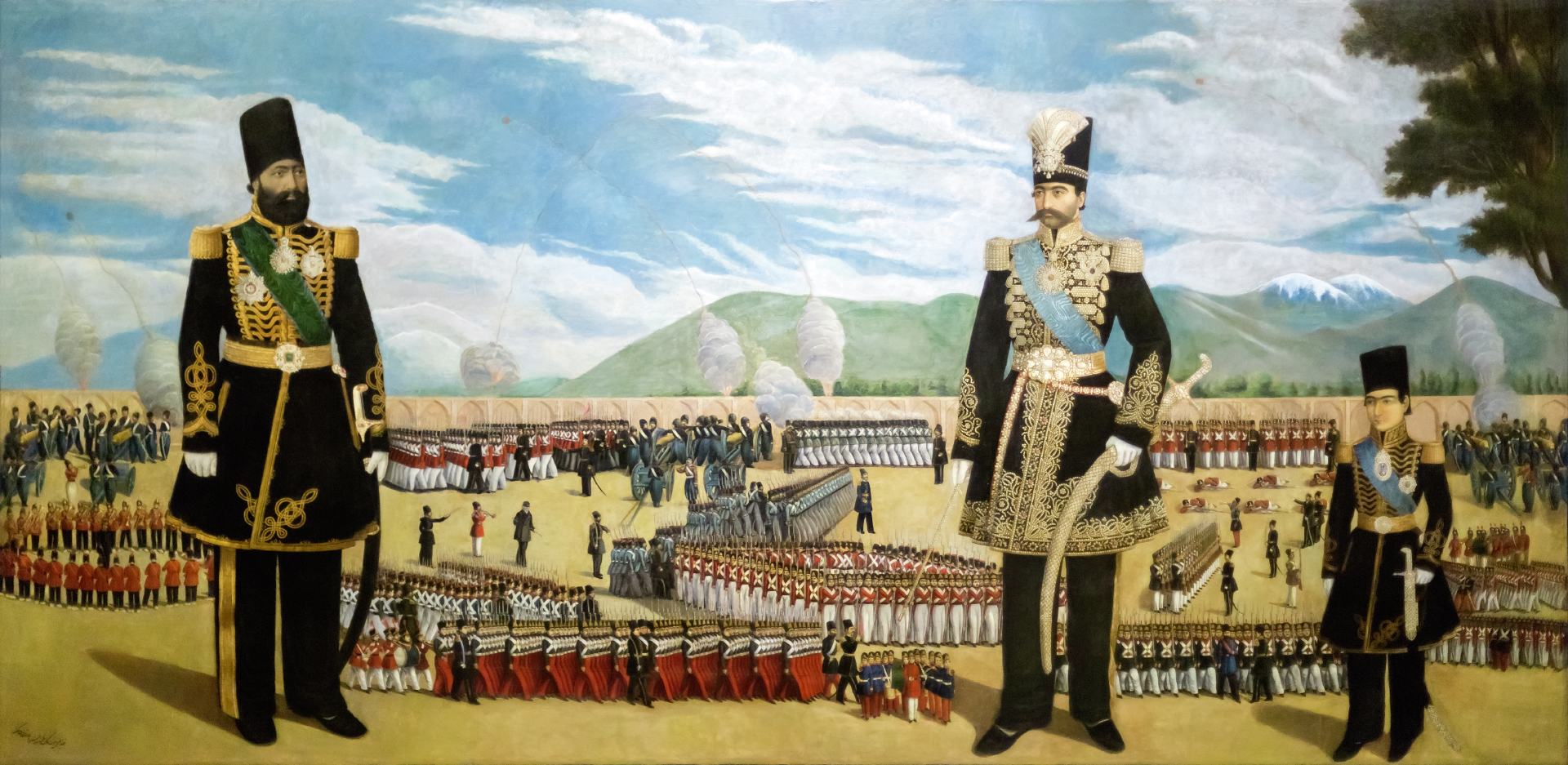
Mohammad Khan and Naser al-Din Shah in Mashq square, by Mohammad Hasan Afshar

With the death of Jafar Khan on November 1862, Naser al-Din Shah abolished council of state and restored the office of grand vizier, but office was vacant for three years. In 23 March 1865, Mirza Mohammad Khan Sepahsalar was appointed as grand vizier, who had been minister of war in that time, Mohammad Khan was appointed as minister of war seven years ago in 1858. But Mohammad Khan's vizeriate lasted after 17 months, as a military man, he focused primarily on military affairs, particularly the army, while neglecting the broader affairs of the country. Moreover, courtiers and ministers appointed by the Shah frequently disregarded his orders, as they were accountable directly to the Shah rather than to him. Eventually, Mohammad Khan was ousted and exiled to Mashhad by the conspiracies of Mirza Yusuf Ashtiani and other courtiers.

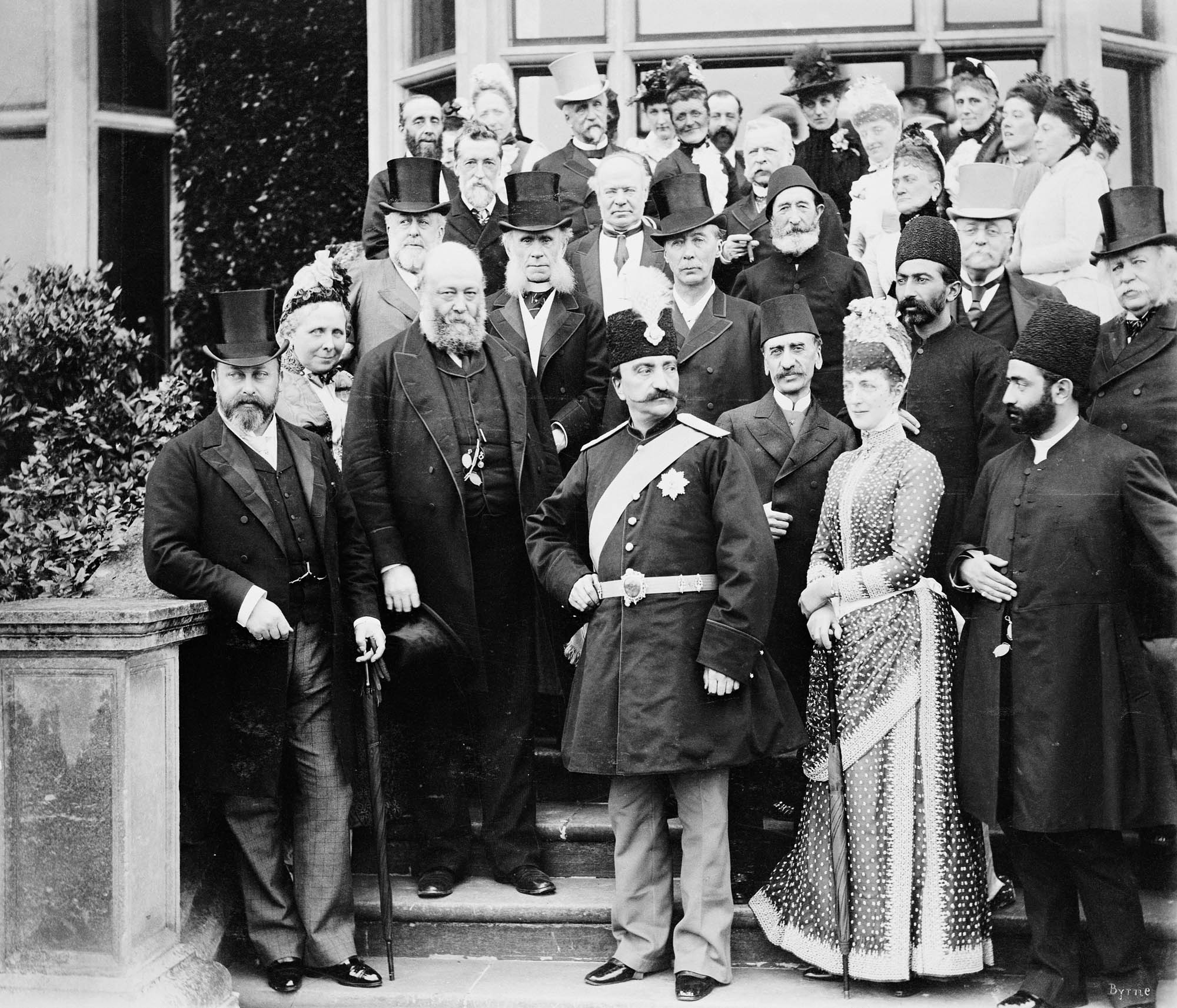
A group photograph taken during a garden party for the Shah at Hatfield House in July 1889. The photograph includes Edward VII and Alexandra of Denmark.

Naser al-Din was the first modern Iranian monarch to visit Europe in 1873 and then again in 1878 (when he saw a Royal Navy Fleet Review), and finally in 1889 and was reportedly amazed with the technology he saw. During his visit to the United Kingdom in 1873, Naser ad-Din Shah was appointed by Queen Victoria a Knight of the Order of the Garter, the highest English order of chivalry. He was the first Iranian monarch to be honoured as such. His travel diary of his 1873 trip has been published in several languages, including Persian, German, French, and Dutch.

In 1890, Naser met British major Gerald F. Talbot and signed a contract with him giving him the ownership of the Iranian tobacco industry, but he later was forced to cancel the contract after Ayatollah Mirza al-Shirazi issued a fatwa that made farming, trading, and consuming tobacco haram (forbidden). Consuming tobacco from the newly monopolized 'Talbet' company represented foreign exploitation and, therefore, was deemed immoral. It even affected the Shah's personal life as his wives did not allow him to smoke.

This was not the end of Naser's attempts to give concessions to Europeans; he later gave the ownership of Iranian customs incomes to Paul Julius Reuter.

=== Reforms ===
He defeated various rebels in the Iranian provinces, most notably in Khorasan, balanced the budget by introducing reforms to the tax system, curbed the power of the clergy in the judiciary, built several military factories, improved relations with other powers to curb British and Russian influence, opened the first newspaper called Vaqaye-e Ettefaqiyeh, embellished and modernized cities (for example by building the Tehran Bazaar) and most importantly opened the first Iranian school for upper education called the Dar al-Fonun where many Iranian intellectuals received their education.

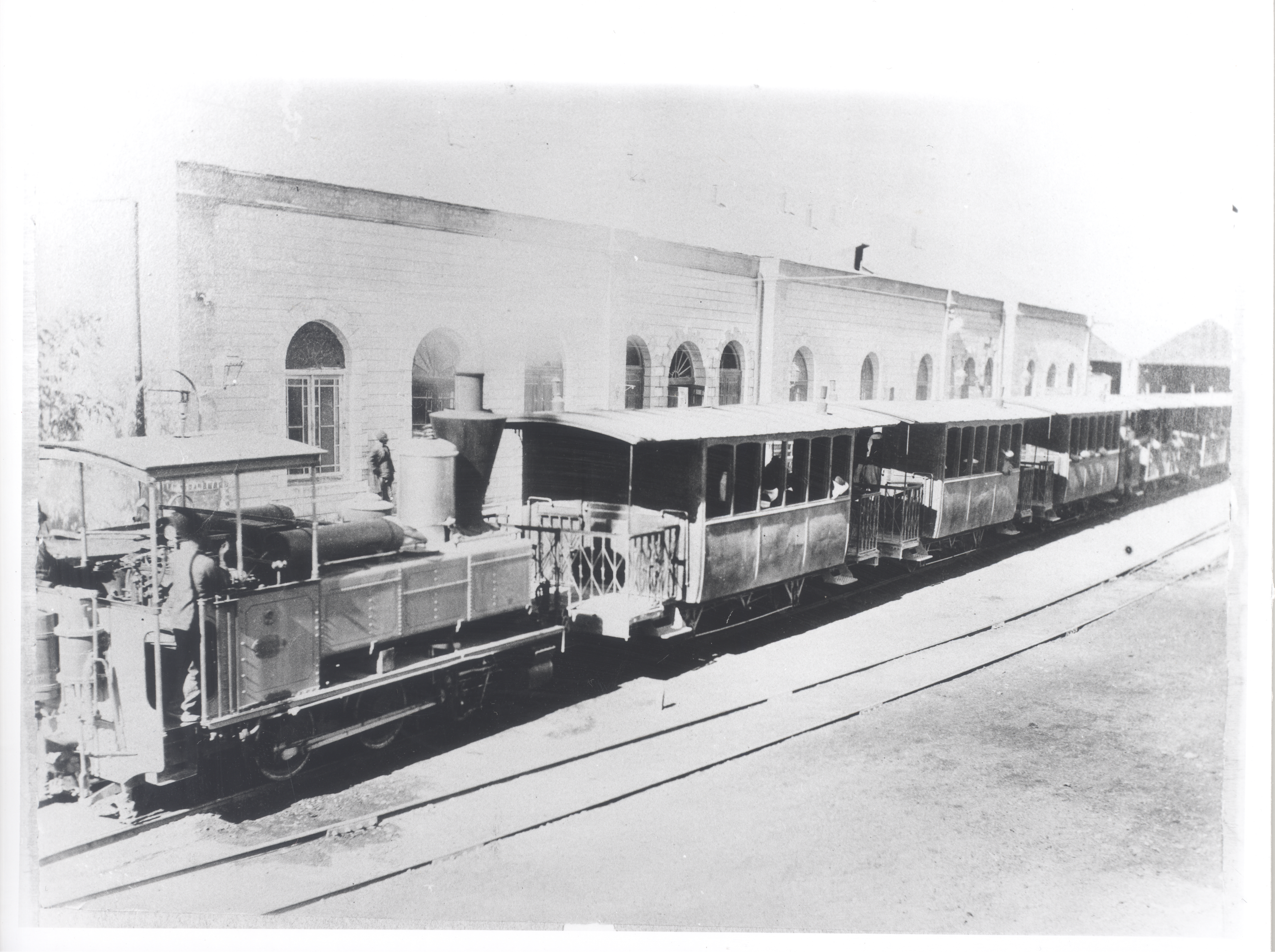
The narrow-gauge Tehran–Rey Railway was erected by the shah in 1888.

The Shah gradually lost interest in reform. However, he took some important measures such as introducing telegraphy and postal services and building roads.

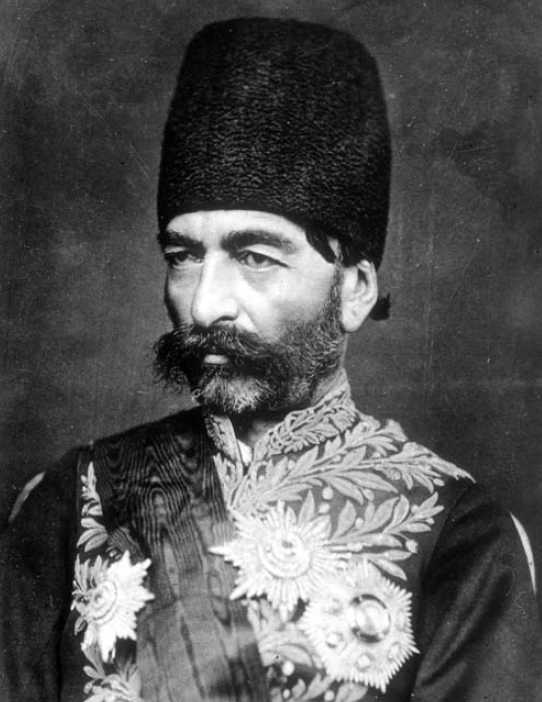
In 1860, the shah established the Ministry of Science and appointed Aliqoli Mirza Qajar as its first Minister of Science.

He also increased the size of the state's military and created a new group called the Persian Cossack Brigade which was trained and armed by the Russians. He was the first Iranian to be photographed and was a patron of photography who had himself photographed hundreds of times. His final prime minister was Ali Asghar Khan, who after the shah's assassination aided in securing the transfer of the throne to Mozaffar al-Din. Although he was successful in introducing those western-based reforms, he was not successful in gaining complete sovereignty over his people or getting them to accept these reforms.

The school he opened, Dar al-Funun, had very small enrollment numbers. The restrictions defined by Shia Islam on the shah's collection of the zakat led to those funds going straight into the coffers of the ulama. Therefore, the financial autonomy given to the ulama enabled them to remain structurally independent, keeping madrasahs open and supporting the students therein. The ulama also maintained their authority to challenge state law.

To fund these new institutions and building projects, Naser al-Din repeatedly used tax farming to increase state revenue. Tax collectors routinely abused their power and the government was viewed as corrupt and unable to protect them from abuse by the upper class. This anti-government sentiment increased the ulama's power over the people because they were able to provide them security. Keddie states in her book, Roots of Revolution: An Interpretive History of Modern Iran, that at the time "it was still considered a sign of greater status to be admitted to the ranks of the ulama than it was to become a member of the civil service."

In the later years of his rule, however, Naser al-Din steadfastly refused to deal with the growing pressures for reforms. He also granted a series of concessionary rights to foreigners in return for large payments. In 1872, popular pressure forced him to withdraw one concession involving permission to construct such complexes as railways and irrigation works throughout Iran. He visited Europe in 1873, 1878 and 1889. In 1890, he granted a 50-year concession on the purchase, sale, and processing of all tobacco in the country, which led to a national boycott of tobacco and the withdrawal of the concession. This last incident is considered by many authorities to be the origin of modern Iranian nationalism.

== Assassination ==
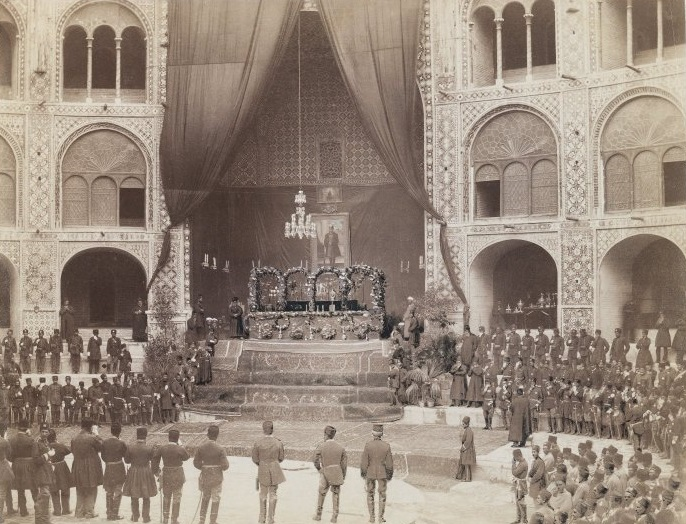
Naser al-Din Shah lying in state in the Tekyeh Dowlat

Naser al-Din Shah was assassinated by Mirza Reza Kermani, a follower of Jamal al-Din al-Afghani, when he was visiting and praying in the Shah Abdol-Azim Shrine on 1 May 1896. It is said that the revolver used to assassinate him was old and rusty, and had he worn a thicker overcoat, or been shot from a longer range, he would have survived the attempt on his life. Shortly before his death, he is reported to have said "I will rule you differently if I survive!" Kermani was prosecuted by the defence minister, Nazm ol-Dowleh.

Naser al-Din Shah's assassination and Kermani's subsequent execution marked a turning point in Iranian political thought that would ultimately lead to the Iranian Constitutional Revolution during his successor Mozaffar ad-Din Shah's turbulent reign.

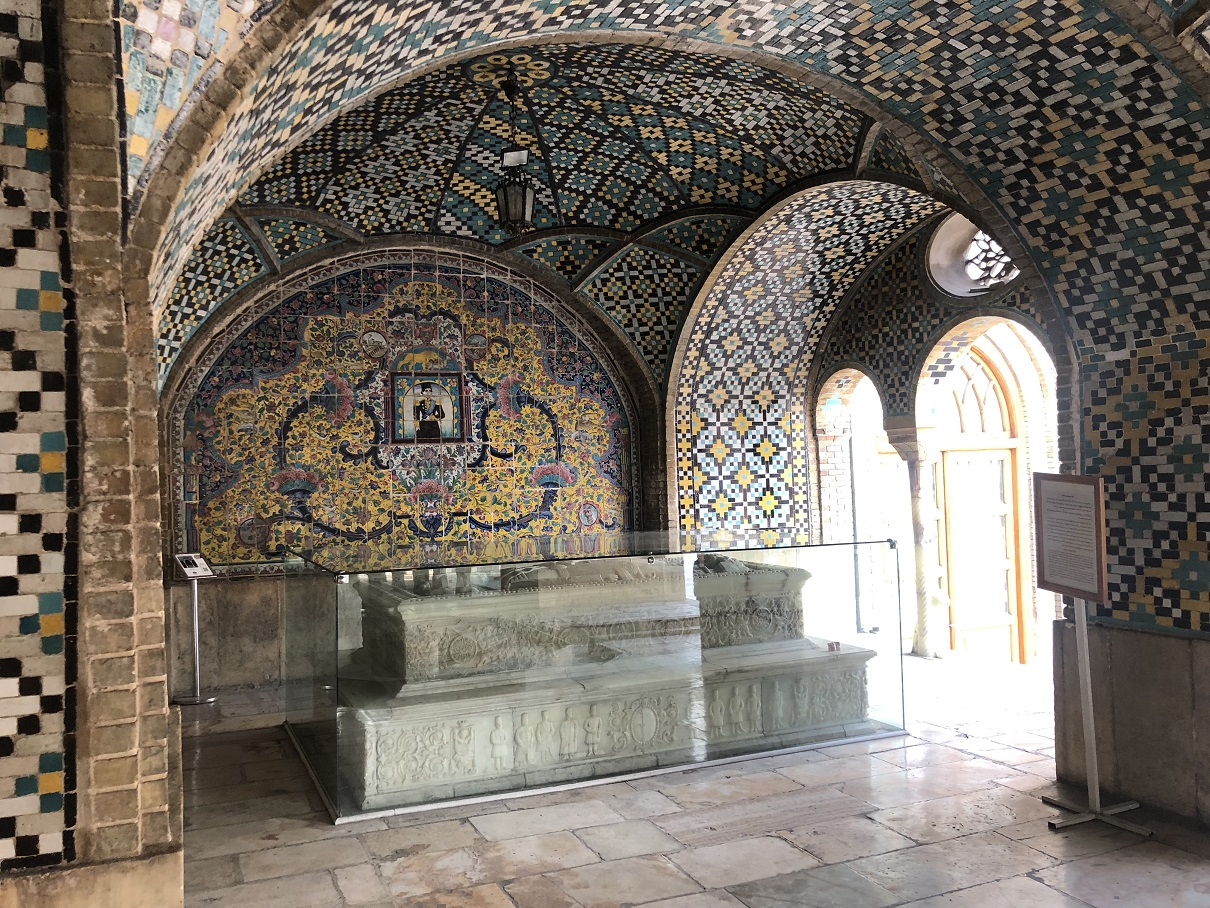
Naser al-Din Shah's tombstone, Golestan Palace. The original tomb is at Shah Abdol-Azim Shrine.

Naser al-Din was buried in the Shah Abdol-Azim Shrine, in Ray near Tehran, where he was assassinated. His funeral took place six months after his death. A British diplomat who spoke with some who had been present, Charles Hardinge, commented "... the corpse was conveyed on a very high funeral car and was 'high' in more ways than one". His one-piece marble tombstone, bearing his full effigy, is now kept in Khalvat-e Karim Khani (part of Golestan Palace).

He was the last Iranian head of state to be assassinated until 2026.

== Personal views ==
=== Jews ===
Naser al-Din Shah inherited an Iran where Iranian Jews, as a protected Dhimmi minority under traditional Shi'i interpretations, faced systemic social, legal, and economic restrictions rooted in notions of ritual impurity (najasat). Yet the shah's personal stance and policies evolved, showing a mix of pragmatic tolerance, responsiveness to the Great Game, and personal curiosity or sympathy influenced by his European travels and admiration for ancient Persian history (particularly Cyrus the Great's role in Jewish history). In 1873, Naser al-Din Shah met a member of the Rothschild family, “a Jew who is exceedingly rich,” as he recalls in his travelogue. He went on to document their amusingly prescient conversation in his diary during his tour through Europe and famously stated:

[Rothschild] greatly advocated the cause of the Jews, mentioned the Jews of Persia, and claimed tranquillity for them. I said to him: “I have heard that you, brothers, possess a thousand crores of money. I consider the best thing to do would be that you should pay fifty crores to some large or small State, and buy a territory in which you could collect all the Jews of the whole world, you becoming their chiefs, and leading them on their way in peace so that you should no longer be thus scattered and dispersed.” We laughed heartily, and he made no reply. I gave him an assurance that I do protect every alien nationality that is in Persia.

— Naser al-Din Shah

In the same year Adolphe Crémieux, director of the Paris-based Alliance Israélite Universelle, had a meeting with the Shah and presented him with details of the problems Iranian Jews were facing. Naser al-Din Shah approved the establishment of school by Alliance and to eliminate the religious anti-Jewish laws. The Alliance School (Tehran) opened in 1898, 25 years after the meeting with Naser al-Din Shah.

== Artistic and literary interests ==
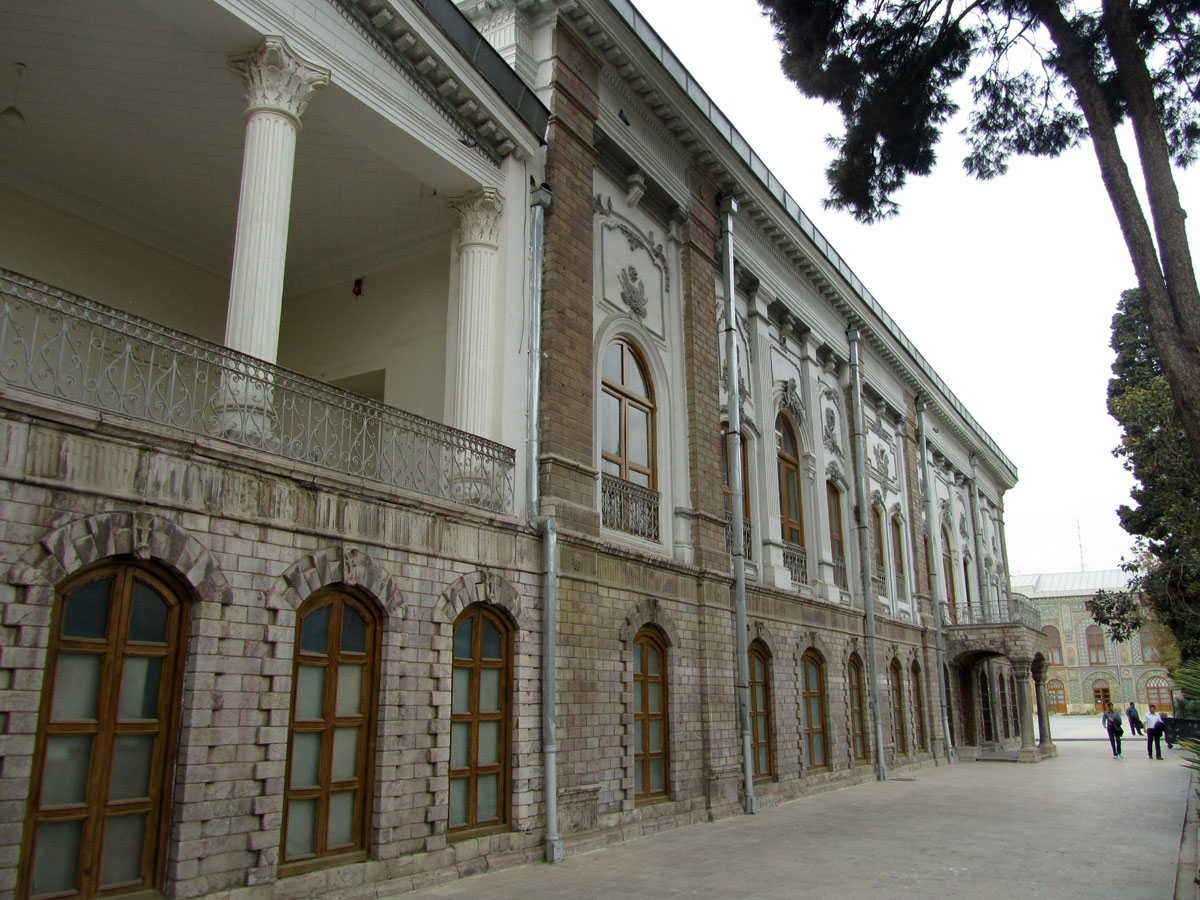
The Abyaz Palace, part of the Golestan Palace Complex

Naser al-Din Shah was very interested in painting and photography. He was a talented painter and, even though he had not been trained, was an expert in pen and ink drawing. Several of his pen and ink drawings survive. He was one of the first photographers in Iran and was a patron of the art. He established a photography studio in Golestan Palace.

Naser al-Din was also a poet. 200 couplets of his were recorded in the preface of Majma'ul Fusahā, a work by Reza-Qoli Khan Hedayat about poets of the Qajar era. He was interested in history and geography and had many books on these topics in his library. He also knew French and English, but was not fluent in either language.

Hekāyāt Pir o Javān (حکایت پیر و جوان; "The Tale of the Old and the Young") was attributed to him by many; it was one of the first Persian stories written in modern European style.

He also wrote the book Diary of H.M. the Shah of Persia During His Tour Through Europe in A.D. 1873.

== Family ==
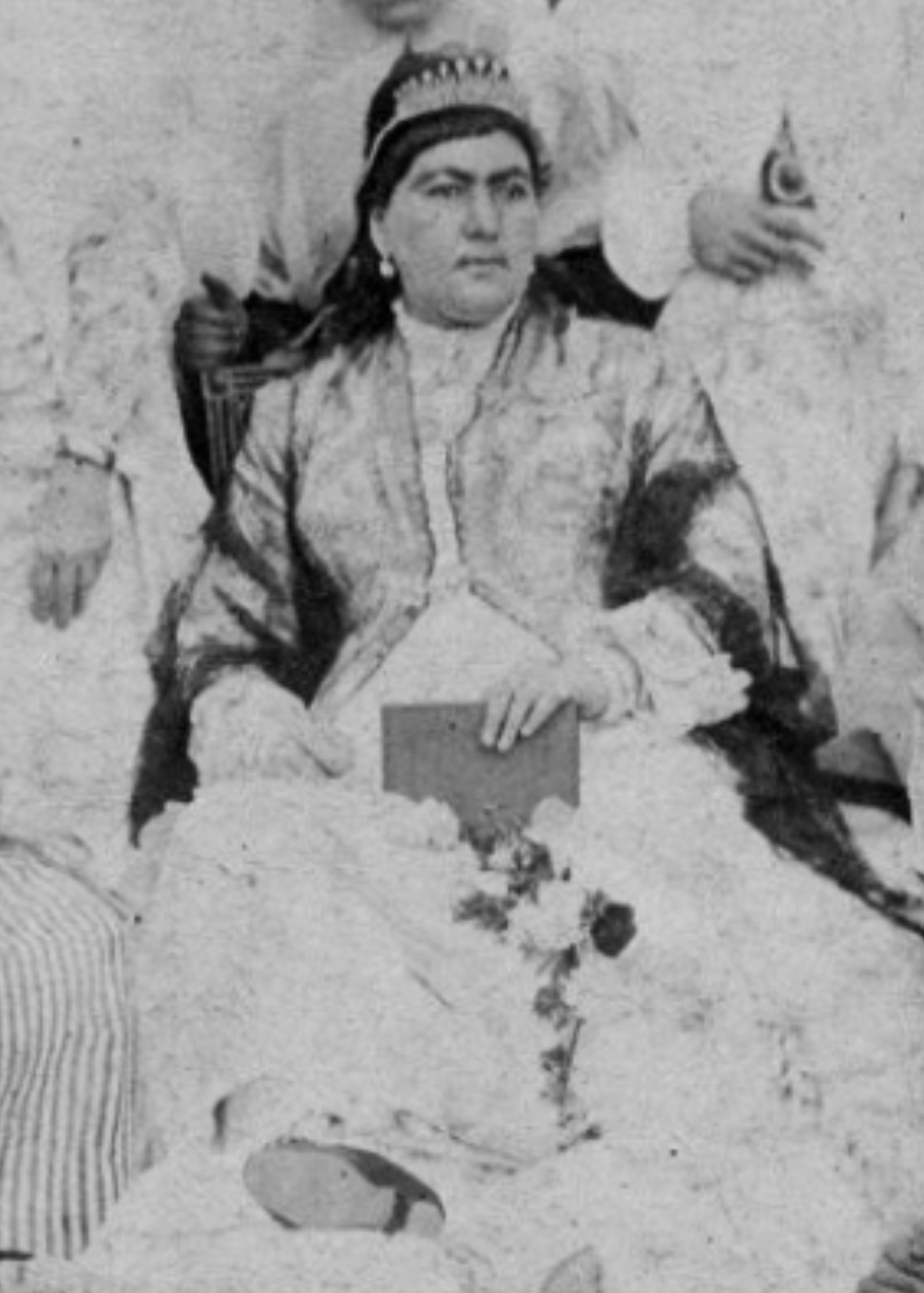
Anis al-Dawla, the most influential and favored wife of Naser al-Din Shah.

Consorts

- Galin Khanom Falkr al-Molk, daughter of Ahmad Ali Mirza, son of Fath-Ali Shah Qajar;
- Setareh Khanom (div.), from the people of Tabriz;
- Shams od-Dowleh, daughter of Ahmad Mirza Azod al-Dawlah, son of Fath-Ali Shah Qajar and Galin Khanom, daughter of Amir Khan Qajar Davallu Sardar;
- Khujastah Khanum Taj al-Dawlah (died c. 1905), daughter of Seyfollah Mirza Jahanbani, son of Fath-Ali Shah Qajar;
- Gawhar Malik Khanom Turan al-Saltanah, daughter of Muhammad Hasan Mirza Mu'tazid al-Dawlah, son of Khusraw Mirza and Qamar Taj Khanom;
- Surur al-Saltaneh, daughter of Imam Quli Mirza Imad al-Dawlah, son of Muhammad Ali Mirza Dawlatshahi;
- Shokouh al-Saltaneh, daughter of Fathollah Mirza Shoa al-Sultanah, son of Fath-Ali Shah Qajar and Shahar Bano Khanom;
- Akhtar al-Saltaneh, daughter of Hasan Ali Mirza, son of Fath-Ali Shah Qajar;
- Badr al-Saltaneh, a Qajar princess;
- Homa Khanom Valizadeh, daughter of Khosrow Khan Ardalan and Hosn-e Jahan Khanom, daughter of Fath-Ali Shah Qajar;
- Jeyran Khanom Forough al-Saltanah (m. 1851; c. 1831 – 2 January 1860), daughter of Muhmmad Ali Khan Of Tajrish, a royal gardener;
- Fatemeh Soltan Khanom Anis al-Dawlah (m. 1859; c. 1842 – 1 October 1896), sister of Muhammad Hasan Mu'azzam al-Dawlah;
- Zubaydah Khanom Amina Aqdas (m. 1860; c. 1840 – 3 August 1891), sister of Mirza Muhammad Khan Malijak;
- Fatemeh Soltan Khanom Khanom Bashi (1868 – 1957), daughter of a gardener, and sister of Mah Rukhsar Khanom;
- Mah Rukhsar Khanom, sister of Fatemeh Sultan Khanom Khanom Bashi;
- Mahbub al-Saltaneh;
- Khazen al-Dawlah;
- Zinat al-Saltaneh, daughter of Hassan Khan Salar;
- Iffat al-Dawlah later Iffat al-Saltanah, daughter of Riza Quli Bayg, Bahman Mirza's servant;
- Monir al-Saltaneh, daughter of Mohammad Taghi Khan and sister of Mohammad Ebrahim Khan Vazir Nezam Nezam ed-Dowleh;
- Sakineh Soltan Khanom Esfahani Kuchak, Vaqar al-Dawlah, a lady from the people of Isfahan;
- Nush Afarin Khanom Matbu al-Dawlah, daughter of Ali Murad Khan;
- Marjan Khanom, a Turkoman;
- Bala Khanom Bozurg Marahim al-Sultanah;
- Hajjiyeh Zahra Khanom;
- Khadija Khanom Akhtar Zaman;
- Agha Shahzadah;
- Khan Zadah Khanom;
- Izzat al-Saltaneh, daughter of Muhammad Ja'far Mirza;
- Khadijah Khanom Vaqar al-Saltanah, daughter of Haji Husayn Ali, a merchant;
- Ayisheh Khanom, sister of Sardar Amjad of Mazandaran and Leyla Khanom;
- Leyla Khanom, sister of Sardar Amjad of Mazandaran and Ayisheh Khanom;
- Ghamar Taj Khanom Zighouleh, sister of Saheb-os-Soltan;
- Nadim al-Saltaneh;
- Vajieh al-Dowlah;
- Hormat al-Saltaneh;
- Vaghar al-Saltaneh;
- Khojasteh Khanom, daughter of Mirza Abdol Motaleb;
- Farangis Khanom, formerly a lady-in-waiting to Izzat al-Dawlah, daughter of Mozaffar ad-Din Shah Qajar;
- Fatemeh Sultan Khanom, from the people of Tehran;
- Roshanak Khanom;
- Shaukat Khanom;
- Nuzhat Khanom;
- Delbar Khanom;
- Zeynab Khanom, formerly a servant of Amina Aqdas;
- A daughter of Hazrat-e Vala Mohammad Hassan Mirza Hashmat al-Saltaneh, Hashmat al-Dawlah;

=== Sons ===
- Prince Soltan Mahmoud Mirza (1847–1849) Vali Ahad of Persia, 1849
- Prince Soltan Moin ed-Din Mirza (1849 – 6 November 1856) Vali Ahad of Persia, 1849–56
- Prince Soltan Mass'oud Mirza Zell-e Soltan (5 January 1850 – 2 July 1918)
- Prince Mohammad-Qassem Mirza (1850 – 29 June 1858) Vali Ahad of Iran, 1856-8
- Prince Soltan Hossein Mirza Jalal od-Dowleh (1852–1868)
- Prince Mozaffar ad-Din Mirza (25 March 1853 – 7 January 1907)
- Prince Kamran Mirza Nayeb es-Saltaneh (22 July 1856 – 15 April 1929)
- Prince Nosrat al-Din Mirza Salar es-Saltaneh (2 May 1882 – 1954)
- Prince Mohammad-Reza Mirza Rokn os-Saltaneh (30 January 1884 – 8 July 1951)
- Prince Hossein-Ali Mirza Yamin od-Dowleh (1890–1952)
- Prince Ahmad Mirza Azd os-Saltaneh (1891–1939)

=== Daughters ===
- Princess Afsar od-Dowleh
- Princess Fakhr ol-Moluk (1847 – 9 April 1878)
- Princess Ismat al-Doulah (1855 – 3 September 1905)
- Princess Zi'a os-Saltaneh (1856 – 11 April 1898) (Note: Zi'a es-Saltaneh married Seyed Zeyn-ol-Abedin Emam Jome'eh. Her daughter, Zia Ashraf Emami married Mohammad Mosaddegh)
- Princess Fakhr od-Dowleh (1861–1893)
- Princess Forugh od-Dowleh (1862–1916)
- Princess Eftekhar os-Saltaneh (1880–1941)
- Princess Farah os-Saltaneh (1882 – 17 April 1899)
- Princess Tadj al-Saltaneh (1883 – 25 January 1936)
- Princess Ezz os-Saltaneh (1888–1982)
- Princess Sharaf os-Saltaneh

Extended family

Jwamer Aga's descendants are related to Nasr al-Din Shah Qajar through the marriage of Jwamer's eldest son to 2 Qajar princesses from Naser al-Din Shah Qajar. (Note: Awene Kurdish Article about Jwamer Agha Hamawand in Sorani by Awene)

== Honours ==
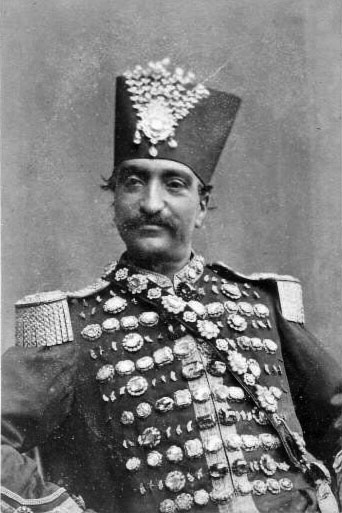
The Shah in a diamond studded uniform. He often wore the famous Darya-ye Noor.

=== Persian ===
- Founder of the Imperial Order of the August Portrait, 1848
- Founder of the Decoration of the Commander of the Faithful, November 1856
- Founder of the Imperial Order of the Aqdas, 1870
- Founder of the Imperial Order of the Sun for Ladies, 1873

=== Foreign ===
- Austrian Empire: Grand Cross of the Royal Hungarian Order of Saint Stephen, in Brilliants, 1859
- Grand Duchy of Baden:
  - Knight of the House Order of Fidelity, 1889
  - Knight of the Order of Berthold the First, 1889
- Kingdom of Bavaria: Knight of the Order of Saint Hubert, 1889
- Belgium: Grand Cordon of the Order of Leopold (military), 4 August 1857
- French Empire: Grand Cross of the Legion d'Honneur, 1855
- Kingdom of Italy:
  - Knight of the Supreme Order of the Most Holy Annunciation, 13 April 1861
  - Grand Cross of the Order of Saints Maurice and Lazarus, 1862
- Netherlands: Grand Cross of the Order of the Netherlands Lion, 1868
- Ottoman Empire:
  - Order of Osmanieh, 1st Class, 1880
  - Order of Glory, 1880
- Kingdom of Prussia:
  - Knight of the Order of the Black Eagle, 12 January 1860; in Brilliants, 1873
  - Grand Cross of the Order of the Red Eagle, in Brilliants, 9 June 1873
- Russian Empire:
  - Knight of the Imperial Order of the White Eagle, 1838
  - Knight of the Order of Saint Andrew the Apostle the First-called, 1873
  - Knight of the Imperial Order of Saint Alexander Nevsky, 1873
  - Knight of the Imperial Order of Saint Anna, 1st Class, 1873
  - Knight of the Imperial Order of Saint Stanislaus, 1st Class, 1873
- Sweden-Norway: Knight of the Royal Order of the Seraphim, 7 March 1890
- United Kingdom: Stranger Knight Companion of the Most Noble Order of the Garter, 26 June 1873
- Kingdom of Württemberg: Grand Cross of the Order of the Württemberg Crown, 1889

== List of premiers ==
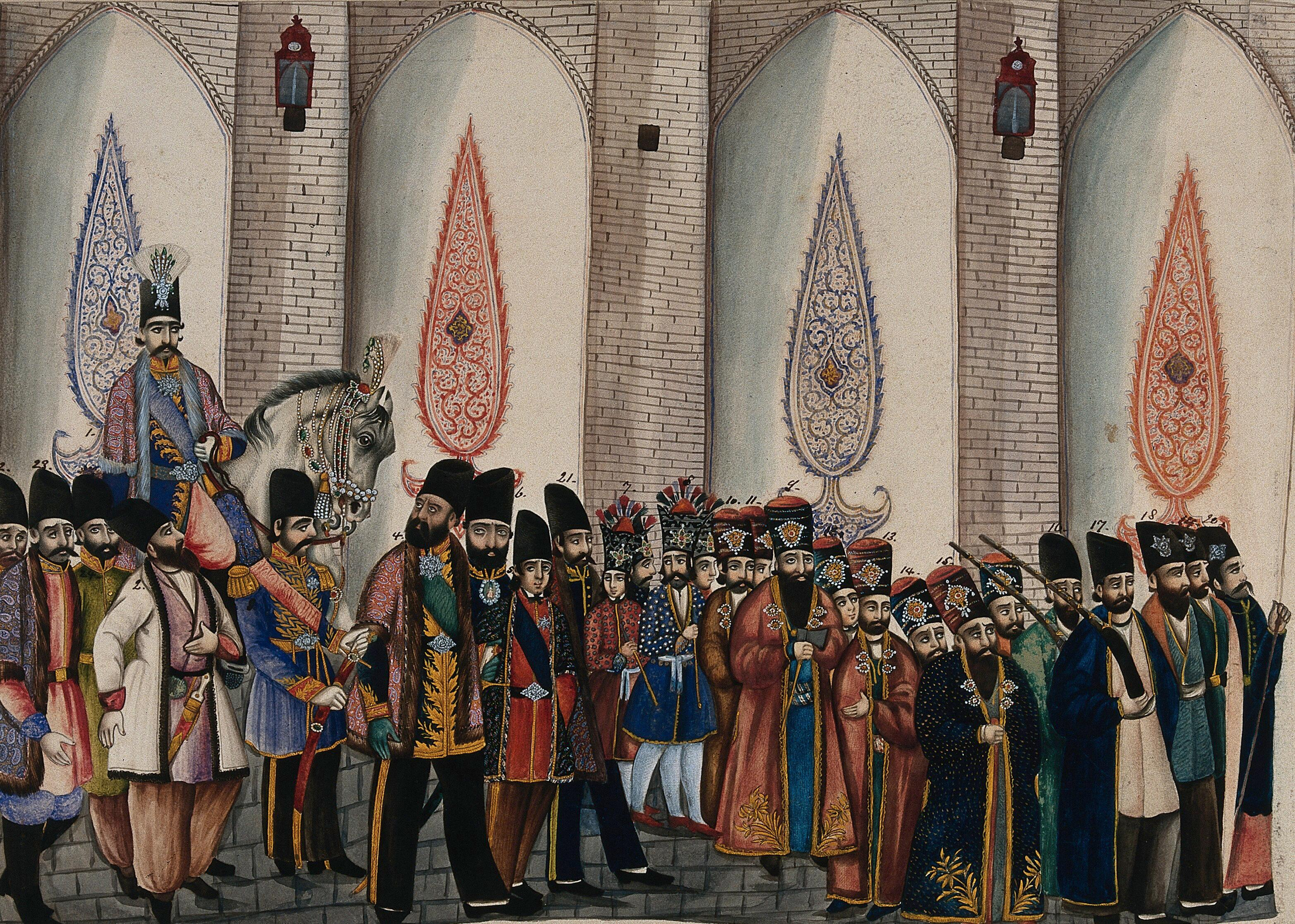
Naser al-Din Shah Qajar sitting on a horse with his entourage of officers, bodyguards, footmen and executioners around him.

- Amir Kabir (1848–1851)
- Mirza Aqa Khan Nuri (1851–1858)
- Post abolished (1858–1871)
- Mirza Hosein Khan Sepahsalar (1871–1873)
- Mirza Yusuf Ashtiani (1873–1880) (1st time)
- Prince Kamran Mirza (1880–1885)
- Mirza Yusuf Ashtiani (1885–1887) (2nd time)
- Mirza Ali Asghar Khan Amin al-Soltan (1887–1896) (1st time)

== Fictional depictions ==
- Naser al-Din Shah is played by Bahram Radan in 2022 tv series Jeyran.
- Naser al-Din Shah is depicted in 1976 TV series Soltan-e Sahebgharan and also in 1984 TV series Amir Kabir.
- He is also depicted in 1992 movie Nassereddin Shah, Actor-e Cinema (Once Upon a Time, Cinema) written and directed by Mohsen Makhmalbaf and 1984 Kamal ol-Molk directed by Ali Hatami.
- He was the inspiration for the main character of the novel De koning, published in 2011, and the novel Salam Europa!, published in 2016, by the Persian–Dutch writer Kader Abdolah.
- It can be inferred from the time period and historical references that Naser al-Din Shah is depicted in the 1990 novel Phantom by Susan Kay which explores the life of the titular character in Gaston Leroux's The Phantom of the Opera.
- In animation form his life depicted by Beate Petersen in Nasseredin Shah and his 84 wives at 2011.
- Joseph Roth: The tale of the 1002nd night: a novel (1939).
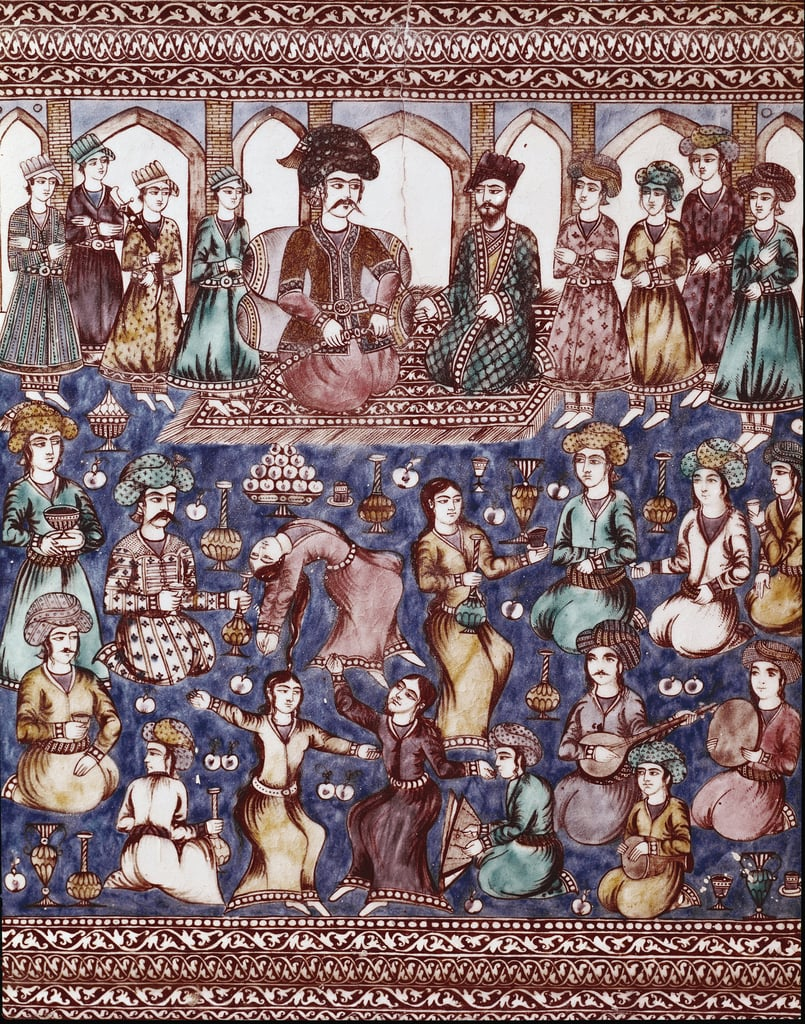
Musicians and dancers at the Court of Naser-al-Din Shah.

== See also ==
- Amir Kabir
- Anglo-Persian War
- Attempts at Constitutionalization in Iran
- Austro-Hungarian Military Mission in Persia
- Bábi Movement
- Imperial Bank of Persia
- Jakob Eduard Polak
- Joseph Tholozan
- Naser al-Din Shah's slide
- Order of Aftab
- Persian Cossack Brigade
- Prix d'Ispahan
- Qajar family tree
- The Great Game
- Tobacco Protest
- Treaty of Paris
- Treaty of Akhal

== Sources ==
- Amanat, Abbas (1997). Pivot of the Universe. Berkeley, California: University of California Press. ISBN 0-520-08321-0.
- Amanat, Abbas (2013). "HERAT vi. THE HERAT QUESTION". In Yarshater, Ehsan (ed.). Encyclopædia Iranica (Online ed.). Encyclopædia Iranica Foundation. Archived from the original on 5 September 2025.
- Busse, Heribert (1982). "ʿABBĀS MĪRZĀ QAJAR". In Yarshater, Ehsan (ed.). Encyclopædia Iranica (Online ed.). Encyclopædia Iranica Foundation.
- Calmard, Jean (2004). "MOḤAMMAD SHAH QĀJĀR". In Yarshater, Ehsan (ed.). Encyclopædia Iranica (Online ed.). Encyclopædia Iranica Foundation.
- Keddie, Nikki R. (2012). Religion and Rebellion in Iran: The Iranian Tobacco Protest of 1891–1892. Hoboken: Taylor & Francis. ISBN 978-0-7146-1971-2.
- Eslami, Kambiz (1999). "FARHĀD MĪRZĀ MOʿTAMAD-AL-DAWLA". In Yarshater, Ehsan (ed.). Encyclopædia Iranica (Online ed.). Encyclopædia Iranica Foundation.
- Anderson, Betty Signe (2016). A History of the Modern Middle East (Electronic ed.). Stanford, California: Stanford University Press. ISBN 978-0-8047-9875-4.
- Cleveland, William L. (2012). A History of the Modern Middle East (5th ed.). Boulder, CO: Westview Press.
- Rabiee, Manizheh (2005). زندگانی ناصرالدین‌شاه [Life of Naser al-Din Shah] (in Persian). Tehran: Mu'assasah-e Farhangi-e Ahl-e Qalam. ISBN 978-964-8084-19-1. OCLC 84660641.
- Elgood, Cyril (2010). A Medical History of Persia and the Eastern Caliphate: From the Earliest Times Until the Year A.D. 1932. Cambridge: Cambridge University Press. ISBN 1108015883.
- Watson, Robert G. (1866). A history of Persia from the beginning of the nineteenth century to the year 1858. London: Smith, Elder and co.
- Calmard, J. (1988). "ʿAzīz Khan Mokrī". In Yarshater, Ehsan (ed.). Encyclopædia Iranica (Online ed.). Encyclopædia Iranica Foundation.
- Amanat, Abbas (2017). Iran: A Modern History. New Haven, Connecticut: Yale University Press. doi:10.2307/j.ctv19prrqm. ISBN 978-0-300-11254-2.
- Nashat, Guity (2000). "Review of Pivot of the Universe: Nasir al-Din Shah Qajar and the Iranian Monarchy, 1831–1896, by Abbas Amanat". The American Historical Review. 105 (4). Oxford University Press. doi:10.2307/2651594. JSTOR 2651594.
- Eslami, Kambiz (2009). "ʿAḍud al-Dawla, Sulṭān Aḥmad Mīrzā". In Fleet, Kate; Krämer, Gudrun; Matringe, Denis; Nawas, John; Rowson, Everett (eds.). Encyclopaedia of Islam (3rd ed.). Leiden: Brill Publishers. doi:10.1163/1573-3912_ei3_COM_23198. ISSN 1573-3912.
- Adamiyat, Fereydun (2006). اندیشه تقدم و حکومت قانون: عصر سپهسالار [The Idea of Progress and the Rule of Law: The Era of Sepahsalar] (in Persian) (3rd ed.). Kharazmi. ISBN 964-487-090-5. OCLC 677122775.
- Cleveland, William L. (2013). A History of the Modern Middle East. Boulder, CO: Westview Press.
- Baron, Charles Hardinge (1947). Old diplomacy; the reminiscences of Lord Hardinge of Penshurst. London: John Murray.
- Tsadik, Daniel (2007). Between Foreigners and Shiʿis. Redwood City, California: Stanford University Press. doi:10.11126/stanford/9780804754583.001.0001. ISBN 978-0-8047-7948-7.
- Sarshar, Houman (2009). "JUDEO-PERSIAN COMMUNITIES". In Yarshater, Ehsan (ed.). Encyclopædia Iranica (Online ed.). Encyclopædia Iranica Foundation.
- Elass, Rasha (2020). "How Paris Bedazzled a Persian King". Tehran Bureau.
- Redhouse, James William (1874). The diary of H. M. the Shah of Persia, during his tour through Europe in A. D. 1873. London: John Murray.
- Sohrabi, Naghmeh (2006). "Redolent Delusions: Nasir al-Din Shah and the art of indifference". Bidoun.
- Algar, Hamid (1989). "AMĪR KABĪR, MĪRZĀ TAQĪ KHAN". In Yarshater, Ehsan (ed.). Encyclopædia Iranica (Online ed.). Encyclopædia Iranica Foundation.
- Netzer, Amnon (1985). "ALLIANCE ISRAÉLITE UNIVERSELLE". In Yarshater, Ehsan (ed.). Encyclopædia Iranica (Online ed.). Encyclopædia Iranica Foundation.
- "Medicine and Books". BMJ. 291 (6499). 1985. doi:10.1136/bmj.291.6499.841.
- Tahmasbpoor, Mohammad-Reza (2008). ناصرالدین، شاه عکاس [Naser al-Din, the Photographer King] (in Persian). Tehran: Nashr-e Tarikh-e Iran. ISBN 964-6082-16-5.
- Mansuri, Kurosh (2006). حکایت پیر و جوان [Tale of the Old and the Young] (in Persian). Tehran: Motale'at-e Tarikh. ISBN 964-6357-69-5.
- "Assassination of Nasser-al-Din Shah". Iran Review. 2016. Archived from the original on 12 January 2019.
- Scheiwiller, Staci Gem (2016). Liminalities of Gender and Sexuality in Nineteenth-Century Iranian Photography: Desirous Bodies. Didcot: Taylor & Francis. ISBN 1315512114.
- Lambert-Hurley, Siobhan (2022). Three Centuries of Travel Writing by Muslim Women. Bloomington, Indiana: Indiana University Press. ISBN 0253062063.
- Scheiwiller, Staci Gem (2025). Women’s Agency and Ontology in Nineteenth-Century Iranian Photography: A Mirror for Princesses. Didcot: Taylor & Francis. ISBN 978-1-040-35154-3.
- Bachtin, Piotr (2015). "The Royal Harem of Naser al-Din Shah Qajar (r. 1848–96): The Literary Portrayal of Women's Lives by Taj al-Saltana and Anonymous 'Lady from Kerman'". Middle Eastern Studies. 51 (6). JSTOR 24585913.
- Amanat, Abbas (1991). "The Downfall of Mirza Taqi Khan Amir Kabir and the Problem of Ministerial Authority in Qajar Iran". Middle East Studies. 23 (4). Cambridge University Press. doi:10.1017/S0020743800023424.
- Farrokhzad, Pooran (2002). کارنامه زنان کارای ایران (از دیروز تا امروز) [Chronicle of Distinguished Iranian Women from Yesterday to Today] (in Persian). Tehran: Ghatreh.
- Davud, Seyyed Ali Al-i (2019). "جعفرخان مشیرالدوله". The Great Islamic Encyclopaedia (in Persian).
- Buyers, Christopher (2003). "Nishan-i-Tamtal-i-Humayun – The Decoration of the Imperial Portrait". Royal Ark. Archived from the original on 23 April 2003.
- Gritzner, Maximilian (1893). Handbuch der Ritter- und Verdienstorden aller Kulturstaaten der Welt [Handbook of Orders of Knighthood and Merit of All Civilized Nations of the World] (in German).
- "Ritter-Orden: Königlich-ungarischer St. Stephans-Orden" [Knightly Orders: Royal Hungarian Order of Saint Stephen]. Hof-und Staatshandbuch der Österreichisch-Ungarischen Monarchie [Court and State Manual of the Austro-Hungarian Monarchy] (in German). 1895.
- "Großherzogliche Orden" [Grand Ducal Orders]. Hof-und Staats-Handbuch des Großherzogtums Baden [Court and State Manual of the Grand Duchy of Baden] (in German). 1896.
- "Königliche Orden" [Royal Orders]. Hof-und Staatshandbuch des Königreichs Bayern [Court and State Manual of the Kingdom of Bavaria] (in German). 1890.
- "Liste des Membres de l'Ordre de Léopold" [List of Members of the Order of Leopold]. Almanach Royal Officiel [Official Royal Almanac] (in French). Brussels: Imprimerie Royale. 1858 – via Archives de Bruxelles.
- Ministero dell'interno (1884). Calendario generale del Regno d'Italia [General Calendar of the Kingdom of Italy] (in Italian). Rome: Unione tipografico-editrice. p. 47.
- Königlich Preussische Ordensliste [Royal Prussian Order List] (in German). Vol. 1. Berlin: Gedruckt in der Reichsdruckerei. 1877.
- Sveriges statskalender [Swedish State Calendar] (PDF) (in Swedish). Stockholm: P. A. Norstedt & Söner. 1895. p. 406 – via GUPEA (Gothenburg University Publications Electronic Archive).
- Shaw, William Arthur (1906). The Knights of England. Vol. 1. London: Sherratt and Hughes.
- Württemberg (Kingdom). Statistisches Landesamt (1894). Staatshandbuch für Württemberg [State Manual for Württemberg] (in German). Stuttgart: Druck von W. Kohlhammer. p. 29.
- Mo'ayeri, Dustali (1982). یادداشت‌هایی از زندگی خصوصی ناصرالدین شاه [Some Notes from the Private Life of Nasser al-Din Shah] (in Persian). Tehran: Nashr-e Tarikh-e Iran.

Naser al-Din Shah Qajar Qajar dynasty Born: 16 July 1831 Died: 1 May 1896
Iranian royalty
Preceded by Mohammad Shah Qajar	Shah of Iran; 1848–1896	Succeeded by Mozaffar ad-Din Shah Qajar
