= Seyfollah Mirza =

Qajar prince (b. 1814)

- Painting by Abu'l-Hasan Sani al-Mulk
- Born: 2 July 1814
- Died: unknown
- Issue: Taj al-Dawlah
- Dynasty: Qajar
- Father: Fath-Ali Shah Qajar
- Mother: Golbadan Baji
- Religion: Twelver Shia Islam

Seyfollah Mirza (Persian: سیف‌الله میرزا; born 2 July 1814) was a Qajar prince and 42nd son of Fath-Ali Shah Qajar. His mother was Golbadan Baji (also known by her honorific Khazen-ol-Dowleh). In 1836, he was appointed as ruler of Semnan. In 1855, he was appointed as ruler of Qazvin and afterward Tuyserkan and Malayer. His descendants achieved high military posts. He was the father of Taj al-Dawlah.
