= Ismat al-Doulah =

Iranian princess (1855–1905)

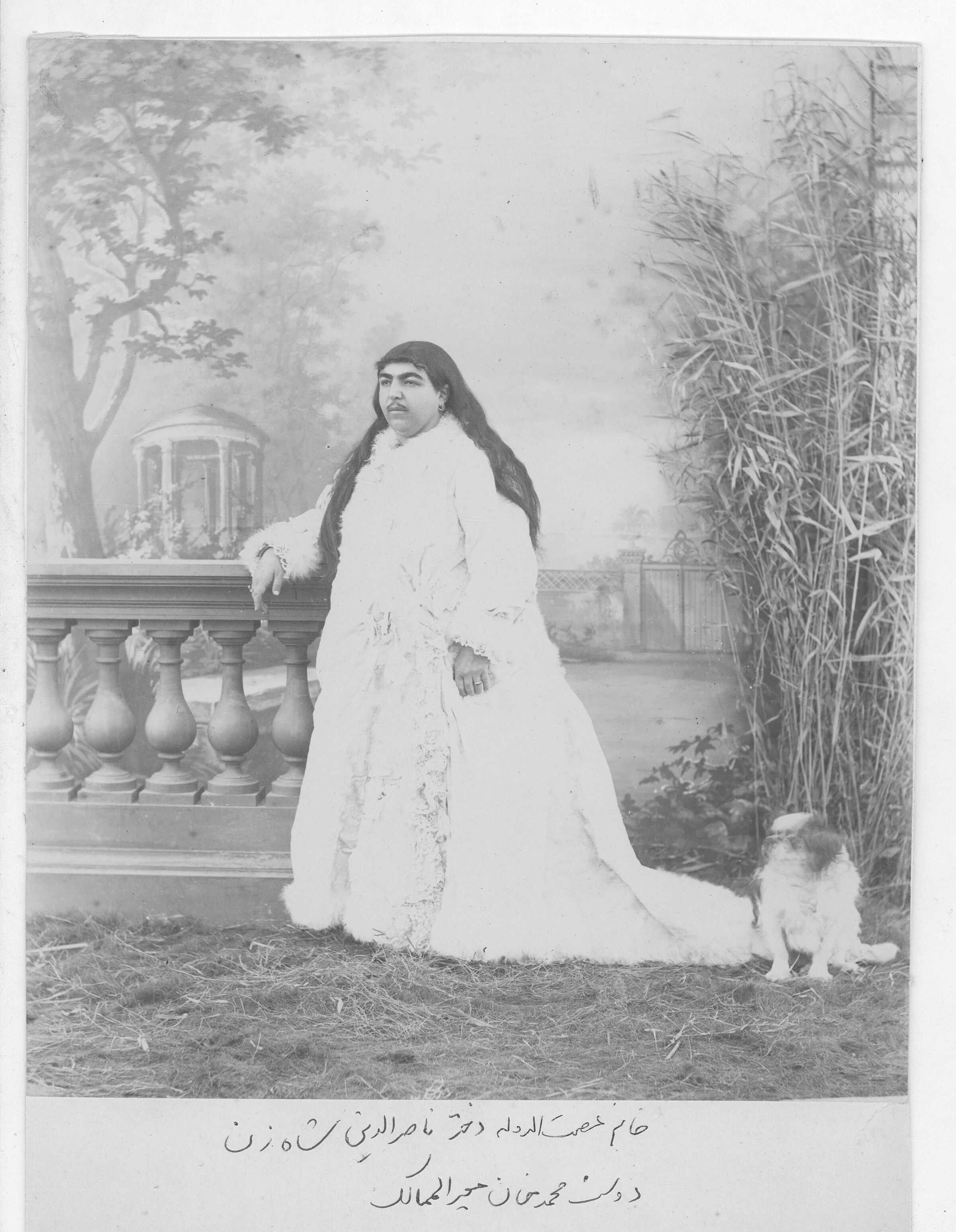
- Born: c. 1855; Tehran, Qajar Iran
- Died: 31 August 1905; Tehran, Qajar Iran
- Burial: Shah Abdol-Azim Shrine
- Dynasty: Qajar
- Father: Naser al-Din Shah Qajar
- Mother: Taj al-Dawlah

'Ismat al-Doulah, 'Ismat al-Dawlah or 'Esmat ed-Dowleh (Persian: عصمت‌الدوله; c. 1855 – 31 August 1905), also known as Fatimah Khanum or Fatemeh Khanum (Persian: فاطمه خانم), was the second daughter of Naser al-Din Shah Qajar (r. 1848–1896) and royal consort Taj al-Dawlah. She married Dost Mohammad Khan Muir al-Mamalek and had four children. She was buried at the Shah Abdol-Azim Shrine. Ismat al-Doulah was a very beloved and pampered girl. Her mother, Taj al-Dawlah, was a princess and one of the distinguished women of the royal court. She was also one of Naser al-Din Shah’s favorite children.

A widely circulated online claim that she was considered the "ultimate symbol of beauty" in Qajar Persia, so much that thirteen suitors killed themselves upon her rejection, has been disproven. Mirza Aghasi gifted Hoseinabad to Naser al-Din Shah, and after some time, this village became part of Ismat al-Doulah’s dowry. They renamed it Mehrabad. Fatemeh, who was given the title Ismat al-Doulah, was a daughter of Naser al-Din Shah Qajar. She was born in 1855 to a woman named Taj al-Doulah. Her mother was the granddaughter of Fath-Ali Shah Qajar and the Shah’s second wife, who married him after he ascended the throne. Fatemeh was the Shah’s second daughter and had an older brother named Sultan Moein al-Din Mirza. Her younger brother was briefly the crown prince but died at the age of nine.

== Piano ==
With the arrival of the piano in Iran in 1864, Ismat al-Doulah became one of the first Iranian women to learn to play it. The story goes that in the upper hall of Anis al-Dawla's residence, there was a piano, but no one in the royal household knew how to play it. At that time, there were only five or six pianos in Tehran, and very few people knew how to play them. Mohammad Sadegh Khan, an unparalleled santur master who was later titled Sarvar al-Molk, could also play the piano beautifully. Ismat al-Doulah entrusted one of her servants, named Tabsom, to the master to learn piano, and whatever Tabsom learned, she taught to Ismat al-Doulah. This became famous among the women of the royal Qajar harem and pleased Naser al-Din Shah.

From then on, every night when Ismat al-Doulah stayed with the Shah, she was required by order to play the piano. She would sit at the piano and play, and when she finished, one of the women who could sing a tasnif (traditional Persian song) would perform. These nights became very lively, with servants running through the palace to summon women who had not yet arrived, saying, "Hurry, Ismat al-Doulah is playing the piano and so-and-so is singing!" At the end, the Shah would reward the musician and singer with a precious jewel or a few gold coins as encouragement.

== Wedding ==
Dost Ali Khan Moayyer ol-Mamalek, a wealthy and influential official, sought Ismat al-Doulah, one of Naser al-Din Shah’s daughters, as a wife for his son in 1283 AH. With the Shah’s approval, she was married at the age of nine to his son, Amir Dost Mohammad Khan. They were married in one of the few exceptionally lavish weddings that took place during the entire Qajar era. It is said that Moayer al-Mamalek provided the wedding guests with fruits from his garden, such as sour cherries, sweet cherries, and plums, and had the entire route of the bride, from the royal palace to the groom’s house, carpeted with Kashmiri shawls.

Madame Carla Serena, an Italian traveller who visited Iran during the Qajar era, in November 1877 (Shawwal 1294 AH) during the reign of Naser al-Din Shah, left a travelogue in which she described Iran and Iranians and gave an account of the wedding of Ismat al-Doulah. In her account, she wrote that Naser al-Din Shah was regarded as a devoted father who was especially fond of his daughters. She stated that Ismat al-Doulah had married the son of Dost Ali Khan Moayyer ol-Mamalek, then head of the treasury, whom she described as wealthy and prominent. According to Serena, the bridegroom’s father paid the expenses of the celebration himself and sought to make the wedding widely known. She also wrote that lavish celebrations were held in Tehran and that the event was long remembered for its scale and splendour.

== Ismat al-Doulah’s House ==
The house of Moayer al-Mamalek and Ismat al-Doulah was located in the Arg (citadel). This residence included five separate buildings, two baths, and two stables. According to the customs of that time, Moayer al-Mamalek had around 22 servants who had houses in Oudlajan, Arg, and Sanglaj. Among them, only two had tenants, which indicated their relative comfort and prosperity. In mid-spring of 1307 AH, one day the Shah, accompanied by the members of his harem, went to the house of Moayer al-Mamalek and his daughter, Ismat al-Doulah—a residence that covered 300,000 square meters. That day, just two hours after sunrise, princes, ministers, and nobles arrived one after another. Moayer stood at the main gate of the large garden to welcome them.After a while, the royal carriage appeared, and the Shah stepped down and entered the inner quarters. Upon entering, he stopped to admire the painted panels and old engravings displayed in the entrance hall. After examining them carefully, he asked a trusted harem attendant to have one of the panels sent to the Diwan Khaneh. The panel depicted a view of the port of Bushehr, drawn by a skilled English panorama artist who had lived in Iran during the reign of Mohammad Shah. It had been displayed until recently in the hallway of the White Palace.As the Shah entered the inner space, he looked left and right, then approached Ismat al-Doulah, who was waiting with Anis al-Doulah and a group of women. He kissed her cheek and said, “Now I understand why you rarely come to your father’s house.

== Husband and Children ==
Dost Mohammad Khan, the husband of Ismat al-Doulah, married her in 1283 AH. In 1288 AH, he received his father’s title. There is no information about the birth date of the couple’s first child. However, according to a manuscript written by Naser al-Din Shah, in 1290 AH Ismat al-Doulah gave birth to a stillborn child. In 1291 AH, in the month of Rabi’ al-Awwal, she had a child who was named Ismat al-Molouk. On 29 Jumada al-Thani 1296 AH, their fourth child, named Fakhr al-Taj, was born.After the death of Dost Mohammad Khan’s mother, he abandoned his family life and went to Karbala, and from there, with the vast wealth he had inherited from his father, he traveled to Europe. The Shah’s efforts to win Dost Mohammad’s favor were unsuccessful, and he spent all of his father’s fortune in Europe. He demanded money from his wife in Tehran, but the Shah forbade her from sending any funds. Due to the difficult economic situation in Europe, Dost Mohammad was forced to return to Iran. Ismat al-Doulah and her mother interceded with the Shah on his behalf, and with the Shah’s support, he finally returned to Iran.Ismat al-Doulah had four children with Moayer al-Mamalek:1_Ismat al-Molouk Moayeri, wife of Mirza Hassan Mostowfi al-Mamalek.2_Dost Ali Moayeri.3_Fakhr al-Taj Moayeri.4_Dost Mohammad Khan Etesam al-Doulah.
