= Arslaan =

- Genre: Fantasy; Action adventure
- Starring: Neil Bhatt; Mukul Dev
- Country of origin: India
- Original language: Hindi
- No. of episodes: 15

Production
- Production company: Sagar Arts

Original release
- Network: Sony Entertainment Television
- Release: 13 July – 19 October 2008

Arslaan is an Indian fantasy television series which aired on Sony Entertainment Television from 13 July 2008 to 19 October 2008. It is the story of a young boy with supernatural powers, set 3000 years in the past. Neil Bhatt plays the lead role as Arslaan.

== Plot ==
Arslaan must defeat the evil Zakfaar. He goes on many adventures with his friends while Zakfaar follows him. The story ends when he takes a gem from Ibleez and uses it to defeat Zakfaar.

== Cast ==
- Neil Bhatt as Arslaan
- Mukul Dev as Zakfaar
- Annie Gill as Rudabeh
- Praneet Bhat as Shefan
- Kishwer Merchant as Mikawi
- Manasi Varma as Aaira
- Puneetchandra Sharma as Aurang
- Amit Pachori

== See also ==
- Amir Arsalan, a Persian epic
