= Fakhr od‑Dowleh =

Iranian princess

Touran Agha
- Fakhr od‑Dowleh
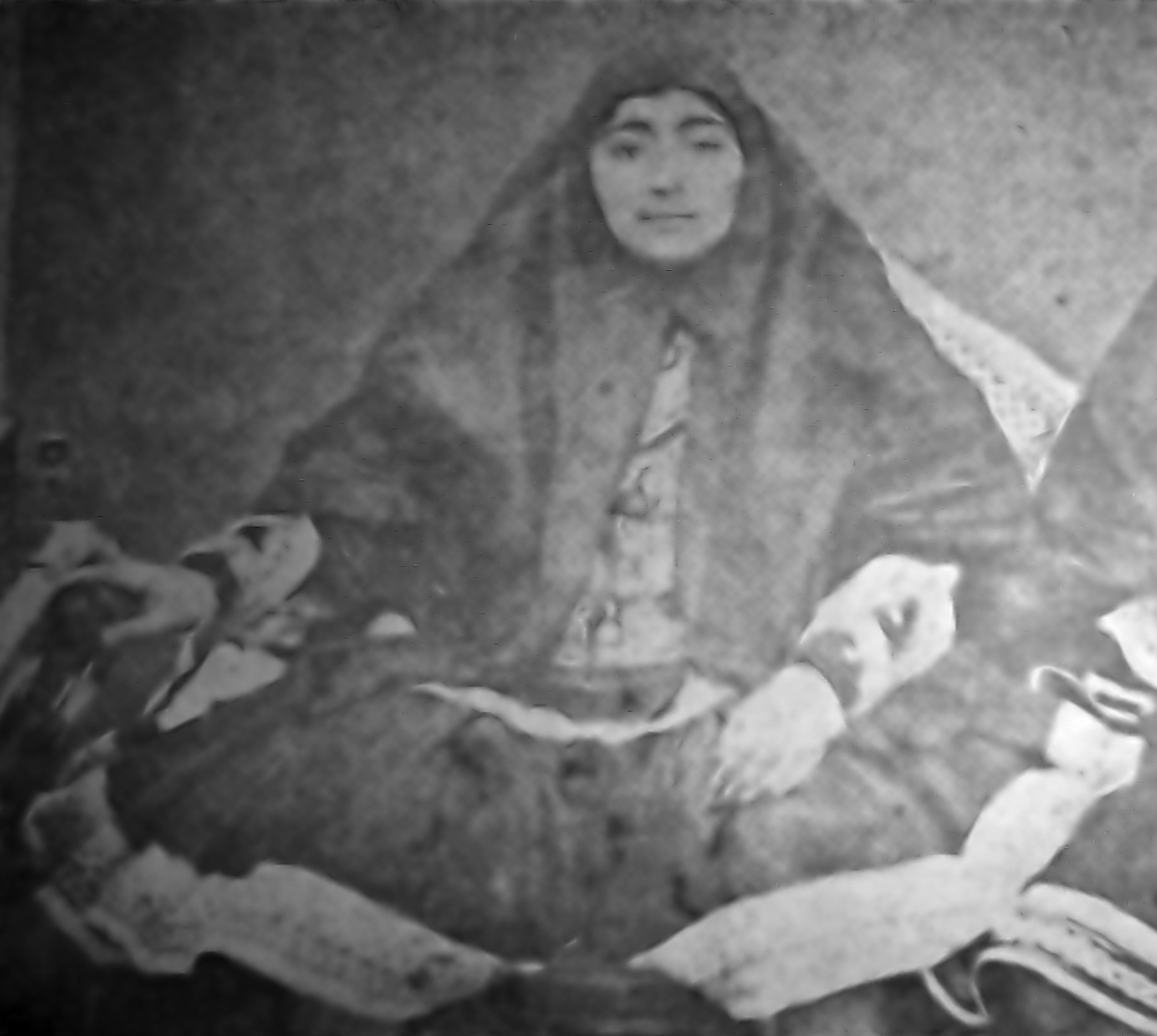
- Born: 1278 AH; Qajar Iran
- Died: 1310 AH (aged 33); Qajar Iran
- Burial: Fatima Masumeh Shrine
- Spouse: Majd ed-Dowleh Qajar-Qovanlu Amirsoleimani
- Dynasty: Qajar
- Father: Naser al-Din Shah Qajar
- Mother: Khazen al-Dawlah

Touran Agha (Persian: توران آغا), known by the title Fakhr od‑Dowleh (فخرالدوله), was an educated and poetically gifted daughter of Naser al‑Din Shah Qajar and Khazen al-Dawlah, and the full sister of Forugh od-Dowleh. Fakhr‑od‑Dowleh was held in high regard by her father and enjoyed a distinguished position within the Qajar harem.

On the nights when Naqib‑ol‑Mamalek, her father's chief storyteller, recited tales, Fakhr‑od‑Dowleh would sit behind the half‑open door of the eunuchs' chamber, carefully writing down the stories and illustrating them. Among the works she transcribed and illustrated were the tales of Amir Arsalan Rumi and Zarrin‑Malek. In her youth, Fakhr‑od‑Dowleh fell in love with Majd ed-Dowleh Qajar-Qovanlu Amirsoleimani and married him. She would accompany her father and her husband to the summer pastures, where she practiced horseback riding and shooting. Fakhr‑od‑Dowleh was highly skilled in marksmanship. Her poetry includes a divan of several thousand verses, written in her own hand, which was kept in the library of Sultan Mahmud Mirza in Paris, though its current whereabouts are unknown. A number of her ghazals in the Iraqi style were also published in literary anthologies from the Naseri era.

== Biography ==
Tuman Agha Fakhr‑od‑Dowleh, the seventh daughter and tenth child of Naser al‑Din Shah, was born in 1278 AH. One year later, another daughter was born to the same mother, named Touran Agha (Forough‑od‑Dowleh). The two girls lost their mother during childhood, before reaching puberty, and Naser al‑Din Shah deeply saddened by the event entrusted them to Taj al-Dawlah, his first legal wife after ascending the throne. Taj‑al‑Dowleh devoted great effort to their upbringing and, by hiring skilled tutors, worked diligently to provide them with a proper education. Naser al‑Din Shah, seeing his daughters as worthy and accomplished, granted Tuman Agha the title Fakhr‑od‑Dowleh and Touran Agha the title Forough‑od‑Dowleh when they reached the age of maturity.

Fakhr‑od‑Dowleh was a beautiful young woman, a poet, a painter, and a gifted calligrapher. According to the author of Behind the Curtains of the Harem, she was exceptionally beautiful, refined, and an eloquent poet with a sweet and graceful manner of speech. She was trusted by her father, and many of the notes that remain from Naser al‑Din Shah were written in Fakhr‑od‑Dowleh's elegant handwriting. From 1299 AH, when she was twenty‑one years old, her script appears intermittently throughout the Shah's memoirs, and a large portion of the entries from 1300 AH onward are in her hand. She eventually fell in love with Mehdi‑Qoli Khan Majd‑od‑Dowleh, the court's master of the stables. Thus, on the 24th of Dhu al‑Qa‘dah 1299 AH, Majd‑od‑Dowleh sent his mother to propose marriage to Fakhr‑od‑Dowleh. Since the proposal did not align with the Shah's wishes, it was met with indifference on his part. But Tuman Agha Fakhr‑od‑Dowleh was too deeply in love to let her father's reluctance—or the will of the sovereign—dissuade her. Thus, on the 20th of Dhu al‑Hijjah 1299 AH, a marriage ceremony was held in the Shah's absence, and she became the wife of Mehdi‑Qoli Khan Majd‑od‑Dowleh. Following this, on the 19th of Jumada al‑Awwal, the wedding ceremony was held, and the next day Fakhr‑od‑Dowleh was taken to Majd‑od‑Dowleh's household. After Fakhr‑od‑Dowleh's wedding, Naser al‑Din Shah wrote: ‘Now that Fakhr‑od‑Dowleh has gone to the house of Amir‑Akhur Majd‑od‑Dowleh, we must write these journals ourselves.'

Marriage did not separate Fakhr al-Dowleh from her father. Despite her deep love for Majd al-Dowleh, she spent most of her days and time in the harem quarters. At that time, her husband held the position of Mir Akhor and was in charge of managing the royal stables. However, complaints against him became so numerous that even being the Shah's son-in-law could not keep him in office. In Jumada al-Thani 1301 AH, the Shah dismissed him and appointed Mohammad Hossein Mirza, the former Mir Akhor, back to the post. Majd al-Dowleh's unemployment lasted for one year and four months. After some time, Fakhr al-Dowleh's distress moved her father to act. On 14 Shawwal 1302 AH, in a letter addressed to Amin al-Sultan, he appointed Majd al-Dowleh to the position of Supervisor of the Khassa (royal domains) Etemad al-Saltaneh, who was a serious opponent of Majd al-Dowleh, wrote about this matter:“This man is very ill-mannered, and his only qualifications are hunting and being the Shah's son-in-law. As even in the royal decree it was written that we gave the supervision to Fakhr al-Dowleh—he is merely her deputy.”

When Naser al‑Din Shah was on his journey to Europe a trip during which he did not take any women with him, though on domestic travels Fakhr‑od‑Dowleh was always among his closest companions Fakhr‑od‑Dowleh conveyed the pain of separation to her father through her heartfelt and sorrowful letters. Fakhr‑od‑Dowleh's wet nurse was Haji Mir Mohammad Aqa, who died on the 17th of Dhu al‑Hijjah 1303 AH. As Naser al‑Din Shah noted in his memoirs, this man had first been the wet nurse of Amir‑Nezam, and now that he had died, Fakhr‑od‑Dowleh wept and mourned deeply. Fakhr‑od‑Dowleh's pageboy was a young man named Mirza Mohammad, who performed the role of Ali‑Akbar in the ta‘ziyeh passion plays. Fakhr‑od‑Dowleh had a eunuch named Sanbolak. In Rajab 1305 AH, Naser al‑Din Shah traveled to Qom for the sixth time. He recorded his memoirs from Monday, the 19th of Rajab which coincided with the 14th of Nowruz until Monday, the 4th of Sha‘ban, when he returned to Tehran. Fakhr‑od‑Dowleh accompanied him on this journey as well, and many of the pages of the Shah's travel memoirs from this trip are written in her elegant handwriting.

The divan of poems by Tuman Agha Fakhr‑od‑Dowleh contains several thousand verses, all written in the poet's own elegant hand. According to Dust‑Ali Khan Mo‘ayyer‑ol‑Mamalek, the manuscript was in the possession of Prince Soltan Mahmoud Mirza, the younger brother of Ahmad Shah, in Paris. In addition to her beautiful calligraphy, Fakhr‑od‑Dowleh was skilled in painting and woodcarving, and she offered help and support to the needy and to orphans.

== Sisterly relationship ==
Majd al-Dowleh attended Naser al-Din Shah twice a day, at lunch and dinner, and removed the seals from the food dishes. In this way, Fakhr al-Dowleh, without any excuse or pretext, spent every day and every journey beside her father. Forough al-Dowleh, the younger sister, while reprimanding her steward, Haji Khan, about financial matters, unintentionally revealed her jealousy: “No matter how much I think about it, I do not do less work than my other sisters—like Nawab Fakhr al-Dowleh. Majd al-Dowleh's allowance is less than that of Aqa Zahir al-Dowleh. Yet they are always traveling with the Shah. I am aware of all the details of their affairs and income, unlike myself. His wife's household has fifty people; mine does not even reach twenty in total. Still, his expenses are no different from mine. I am not blind—I see people. I see my own situation and that of others as well. Every year I spend all my allowance and my husband's, and at the end of the year you still present me with an extra ten thousand tumans in expenses.”

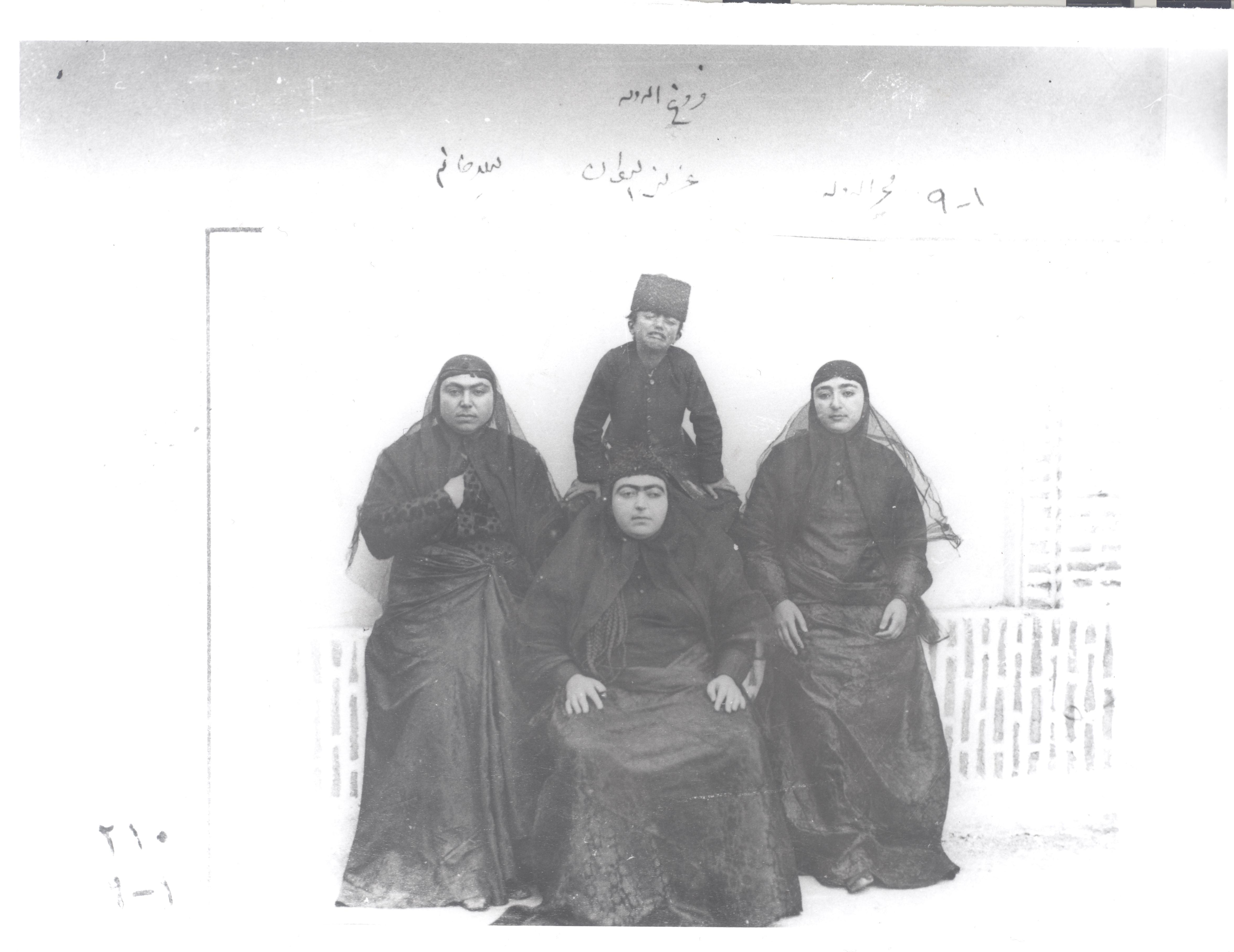
Fakhr‑od‑Dowleh (right) with Forugh od-Dowleh (centre)

Although the two sisters were very close, there was a faint and subtle rivalry and jealousy between them. No letters from Fakhr al-Dowleh have survived that would reveal her feelings in this regard. However, from the surviving writings of Forough al-Dowleh, we learn of this matter: “Honorable Haji Khan… although at the table everything should be set in pairs, they place only one. Nawab Fakhr al-Dowleh gives her steward one hundred tumans a month on contract for henna, dye, soap, candles, and everything else. Her table setting is also much better than mine…” And elsewhere: “I wanted to dismiss Gholam Hossein, but I refrained for one reason: since Nawab Fakhr al-Dowleh had also brought in a singer, I brought Gholam Hossein at the same time. Now it has been a month since Fakhr al-Dowleh dismissed her singer. If I dismiss mine as well, she will be offended with me…” And in another place she writes: “For three hundred tumans, such details should not be necessary—that a person must chase the money for three months, run day and night, and still not obtain it… He wanted four hundred tumans from Fakhr al-Dowleh; Fakhr al-Dowleh told Khanom Baji. The day before yesterday in the morning she went, and by noon she had brought the money.”

== Death ==
Yet it seemed that fate did not favor Tuman Agha Fakhr‑od‑Dowleh, the cherished daughter of the sovereign and one of the most distinguished women of the court. Like Majd‑od‑Dowleh's first wife, she remained without children and, in 1309 AH, fell ill with tuberculosis. Because of this illness, she died at the age of thirty‑three. Little by little, the illness grew stronger and the patient weaker, until the danger became imminent and the physicians ordered that she be taken to a more spacious place with fresher air. Majd‑od‑Dowleh rented one of Arbāb Jamshid's houses, located on the street bearing his name in the northern part of the city—an open, quiet area far from the noise of the center—and brought his beloved, ailing wife there. Naser al‑Din Shah visited his cherished daughter several times in that house, each time sitting by her bedside for an hour, comforting and caressing her. On his final visit, as he was leaving the room, witnesses saw him weeping bitterly.”

A few verses of her poetry are inscribed on her tombstone in the courtyard of the shrine of Fatemeh Masoumeh.“Mohammad‑Hassan Khan E‘temad‑ol‑Saltaneh writes in his diary, under the events of 4 Ramadan 1310 AH: ‘Fakhr‑od‑Dowleh Tuman Agha, the Shah's daughter, passed away this morning. This princess was thirty‑three years old and was the finest of the Shah's children—endowed with beauty and accomplishment, skilled in calligraphy and composition, and a painter. The arrangement of the two tales Amir Arsalan and Zarrin‑Malek was conceived by Naqib‑ol‑Mamalek and carried out through the effort and handwriting of Fakhr‑od‑Dowleh.“She was also skilled in music. Yet, as the famous saying goes, ‘a fine grape had fallen to the share of a jackal.' She had fallen in love with Mehdi‑Qoli Khan Majd‑od‑Dowleh and, against her father's wishes, had been his wife for seven or eight years. She left no children behind.
