= Mohammad Naser Khan Zahir od-Dowleh =

Iranian government official (died 1877)

- محمدناصرخان ظهیرالدوله
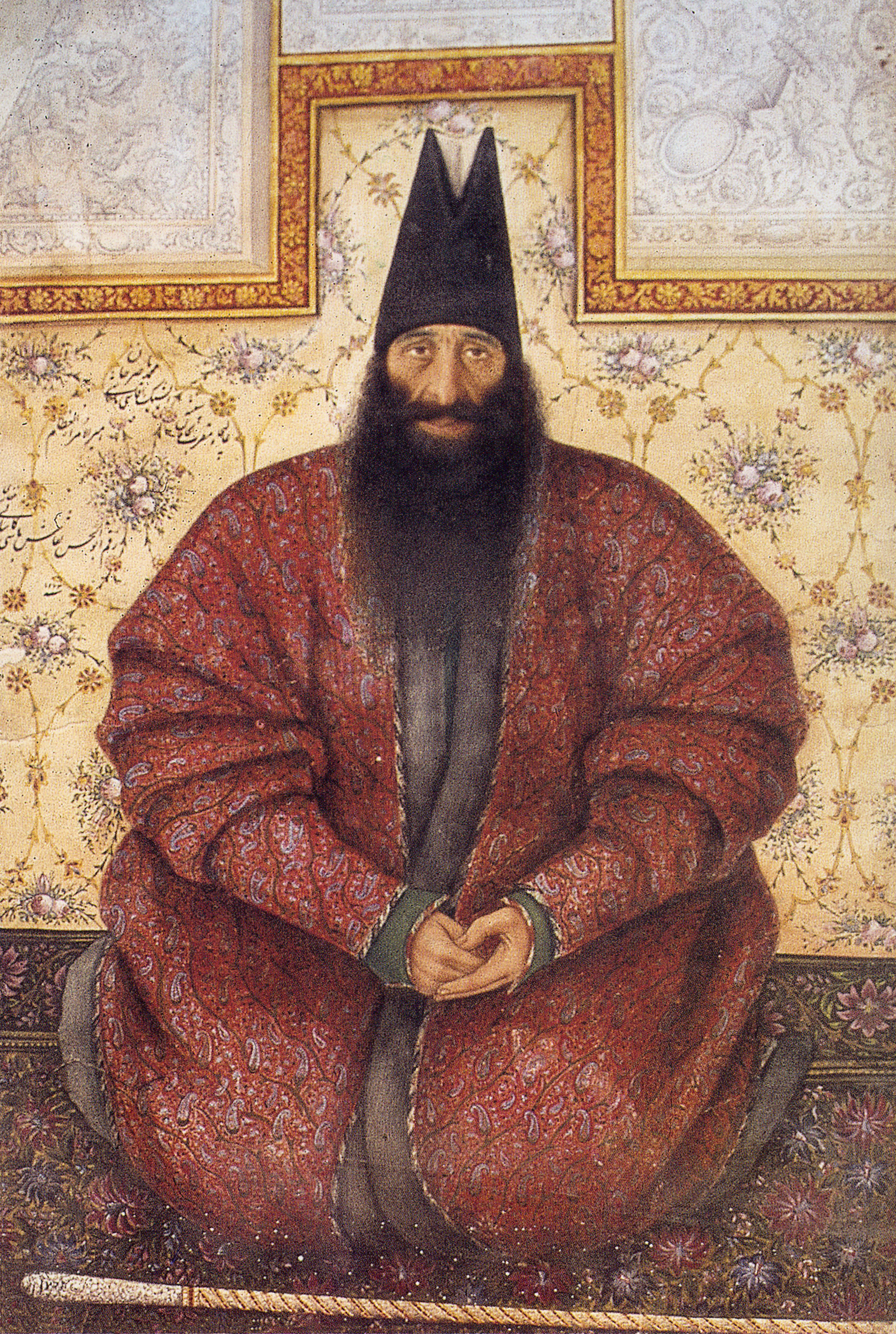
- Portrait of Mohammad Naser Khan Zahir od-Dowleh by Sani ol-Molk, dated 1857

Minister of Justice
- In office 1871/1872
- Monarch: Naser al-Din Shah Qajar
- Preceded by: Mirza Hosein Khan Sepahsalar
- Succeeded by: Pasha Khan Amin ol-Molk

Personal details
- Born: Qajar Iran
- Died: 1877 Qajar Iran
- Children: Ali Khan Zahir od-Dowleh
- Tribe: Qajar

Mohammad Naser Khan Zahir od-Dowleh (Persian: محمدناصرخان ظهیرالدوله; died 1877) was an Iranian official from the Qajar tribe, who served in several high-ranking offices, including as the Minister of Justice in 1871 or 1872. He was the father of Ali Khan Zahir od-Dowleh, a prominent politician and scholar.

== Background and exile ==
Mohammad Naser Khan Zahir od-Dowleh was the son of Mohammad Ebrahim Khan Sardar and a member of the Davalu clan of the Qajar tribe. Between 1847 and 1850, Hasan Khan Salar rebelled against the Iranian government as part of a power struggle by the Davalu. During this period, many individuals were either deported to other provinces or imprisoned by the government due to suspicion of sympathizing or collaborating with Hasan Khan Salar. This included Mohammad Naser Khan, who was exiled to the town of Kerman and put under surveillance through the suggestion of the prime minister Haji Mirza Aqasi. In 1834, Mohammad Naser Khan took advantage of Mohammad Shah Qajar's death and the absence of Kerman's governor Fazl Ali Khan Qarabaghi by fleeing to Tehran. Fazl Ali Khan Qarabaghi, who was at the time in the Yazd province, discovered that Mohammad Naser Khan had escaped and arrested him close to the town of Ardakan, bringing him back to Kerman.

== Career ==
After the coronation of Naser al-Din Shah Qajar in 1848, Tahmasp Mirza Moayed od-Dowleh became the new governor of Kerman, and Mohammad Naser Khan went back to Tehran. He remained unemployed until 1861, when the army of the governor of Khorasan, Hamzeh Mirza Heshmat od-Dowleh and his minister Mirza Mohammad Qavam al-Dawla were defeated by the Turkmens, which led to their dismissal. Instead, Morad Mirza Hesam o-Saltaneh was given the governorship of Khorasan for the third time, with Mohammad Naser Khan being appointed as his minister and given the title of "Zahir od-Dowleh".

With Mohammad Naser Khan leading the military, Morad Mirza worked to manage the Turkmen threat and stabilize the region, as he had in the 1850s. The Kurdish Zafaranlu tribe of Quchan played an important role in fending off the Turkmen attacks, especially Amir Hossein Khan Ilkhani. In 1862, Mohammad Naser Khan was appointed as the minister of the governor of the Fars province, Mass'oud Mirza Zell-e Soltan, but was replaced the next year by Mirza Mohammad Qavam al-Dawla. In 1866, Naser al-Din Shah, acting on his whims, gave various temporary offices to different individuals, including Mohammad Naser Khan, who was appointed as the Minister of the Court, as well as being entrusted with looking after the princes, scholars, seyyeds, aristocrats, post offices, the management of grain in Tehran, and the governorships of Jowsheqan, Golpayegan, and Khansar.

In October 1867, Mohammad Naser Khan was appointed as the minister of Naser al-Din Shah's son Soltan Hossein Mirza Jalal od-Dowleh, who governed Khorasan. Although Jalal od-Dowleh was officially in charge, the real authority was held by Mohammad Naser Khan and the sepahsalar (commander) Mirza Mohammad Khan. In 1871/72, Mohammad Naser Khan was appointed as the Minister of Justice, thus succeeding Mirza Hosein Khan Sepahsalar. However, he was soon replaced by Pasha Khan Amin ol-Molk. After Hossein Khan Shahsevan's death in March 1875, Mohammad Naser Khan succeeded him as the governor of Khorasan, holding the office until his death in 1877.

Mohammad Naser Khan had a son named Ali Khan Zahir od-Dowleh, a prominent politician and scholar.

== Sources ==
- Amanat, Abbas (1997). Pivot of the Universe: Nasir Al-Din Shah Qajar and the Iranian Monarchy, 1831–1896. I.B. Tauris. ISBN 978-1845118280.
- Bamdad, Mehdi (1972). شرح حال رجال ایران در قرن ۱۲ و ۱۳ و ۱۴ هجری [Biographies of [notable] personages of Iran in the 12th, 13th, and 14th/18th, 19th, and 20th centuries, vol. 4].
- Hasani, Mitra Agha Mohammad (2020). "ظهیرالدوله". The Great Islamic Encyclopaedia (in Persian).
- Noelle-Karimi, Christine (2014). The Pearl in its Midst: Herat and the Mapping of Khurasan (15th-19th Centuries). Austrian Academy of Sciences. ISBN 978-3700172024.
