= Naqib ol Mamalek =

Persian storyteller and author

Naghib ol Mamalek (Persian: نقیب‌ الممالک) was the title of the Chief-Persian storyteller in Qajar Iran. During the reign of Naser al-Din Shah Qajar, the popular Persian epics of Amir Arsalan, Malak Jamshid and other colloquial Iranian stories were told to the Shah by the Naghib ol Mamalek.

Malak Jamshid is clearly attributed to Mirza Mohammad Ali Naghib ol-Mamalek (Persian: میرزا محمد علی نقیب‌ الممالک). The Author of Amir Arsalan is disputed: While the Persian scholar Dr. Mohammad Jafar Mahjoub contributed this story also to Mohammad Ali Naghib ol-Mamalek, a second possible author Mirza Ahmad Naghib ol Mamalek is named by other sources. Most scholars hold Mohammad Ali for the more plausible author, although both are attested as Naqals (storytellers) of the Qajar period.
