= Khazen al-Dawlah =

Iranian royal administrator and concubine

Khazen al-Dawlah خازن‌الدوله

Consort of the Qajar Shah
- Spouse: Naser al-Din Shah Qajar
- Issue: Forugh od-Dowleh; Fakhr od‑Dowleh
- House: Qajar

Khazen al-Dawlah (Persian: خازن‌الدوله) was a consort of Naser al-Din Shah Qajar, the fourth shah of Qajar Iran (r. 1848–1896). She was the mother of Forugh od-Dowleh and Fakhr od‑Dowleh.

She was a maid servant of Malek Jahan Khanom, the Shah's mother. When Malek Jahan Khanom died in 1873, he married Gulbadan Khanom so she could take over his mother's task to function as the administrator of the Qajar harem and the treasurer of the Shah, and was thus given the new name and title of Khazen al-Dawlah. Technically, the limit of wives for a man being limited by Islamic law to four, she was his concubine rather than legal wife.
