= Mohammad Jafar Mahjoub =

Iranian scholar (1924–1996)

Mohammad Jafar Mahjoub (Persian: محمدجعفر محجوب; 23 August 1924 – 17 February 1996) was an Iranian scholar of Persian literature, essayist, translator and teacher.

== Life ==
Mahjoub was born in Tehran in 1924 and graduated from the prestigious Alborz High School in 1944. He obtained his bachelor's degree in political science from Tehran University in 1947.

During this time he was employed as a stenographer at the Majlis, where he was recruited into the leftist Tudeh Party. He continued his affiliation with the Tudeh Party for some ten years, working in the press division and authoring unsigned editorials. He later severed all ties with the party and focused strictly on scholarly pursuits.

He obtained a second bachelor's degree in 1954 and his Ph.D. in Persian literature from Tehran University in 1963. His dissertation on the Khorasani style in Persian poetry was published as a book and is regarded as a standard text on the subject.

He taught Persian literature at the Teacher Training College (Tarbiat Moallem University), becoming full professor in 1968, and at Tehran University. He was a visiting professor at Oxford University in the academic year 1971-72, and a guest professor at the University of Strasbourg in 1972-73. He was Iran's cultural attaché to Pakistan from 1974 to 1979.

After the 1979 Iranian Revolution he was appointed as the head of Academy of Persian Language and Literature and the National Academy for the Arts, a post he held until 1980.

== Life in exile ==
In 1980 Mahjoub left Iran for Paris, giving weekly lectures on Persian folk literature at the École Pierre Brossolette. He returned to the University of Strasbourg teaching there from 1982 to 1984 and was the president of the Persian Cultural Society in Paris from 1986 to 1993.

He later moved to the United States and began teaching at the University of California, Berkeley in 1991 until his death from prostate cancer in 1996.

== Selected works ==
Mahjoub is known for his works on Iranian folk literature and language, for his scholarly editorship of several classical texts, as a translator and a consummate academic and teacher.

== Author ==
- Dictionary of Folk Expressions (with Mohammad-Ali Jamalzadeh)
- On Kalila-o Demna, 1960
- Khorasani Style in Persian Poetry, 1966
- Best of Ferdowsi, 1993 (essays)
- Ashes of Life, 2000 (essays)
- Folk literature of Iran, 2003 (essays)

== Scholarly editor ==
- Works of Qa'ani Shirazi, 1957
- Vis O Ramin, 1958
- Works of Soroush Esfahani, 1960
- Amir Arsalan, 1961
- Complete Works of Iraj Mirza, 1962
- Modalities of Truth (Tara-eq al-haqa-eq), 1966
- Royal Book of Chivalry (Fotovat-nama-ye Soltani), 1971
- Complete Works of Obeid Zakani, 1999

== Translations ==
- Steinbeck's The Pearl (from French), 1949
- Jack London's South Sea Tales, 1951
- Jack London's The Iron Heel, 1953 (under pseudonym M. Sobhdam)
- Dostoyevsky's The House of the Dead, 1956
