= Forugh od-Dowleh =

Daughter of Naser al-Din Shah Qajar

Tuman Agha
- Forugh od-Dowleh; Malakeh-ye Iran
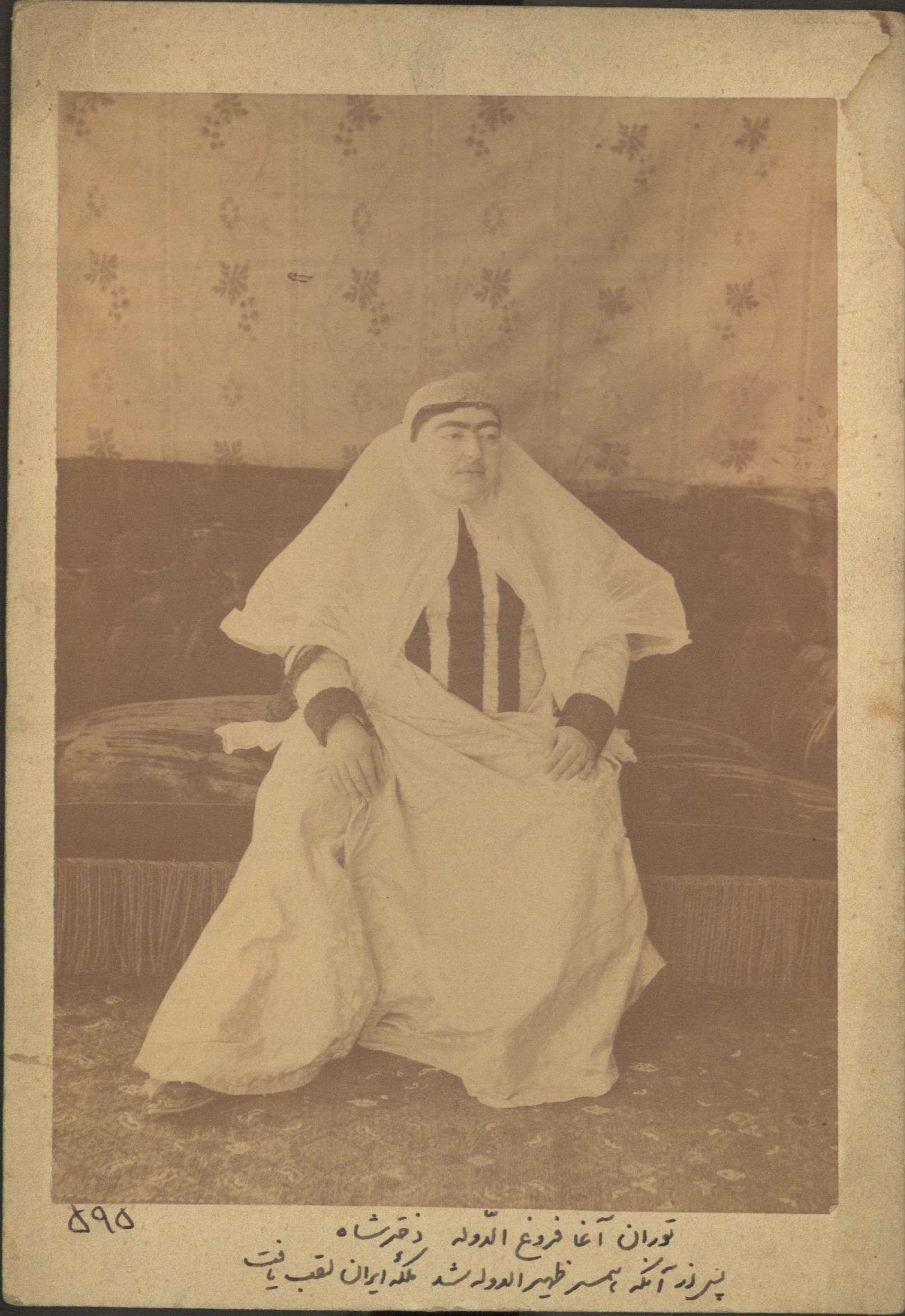
- Spouse: Ali Khan Zahir od-Dowleh
- Dynasty: Qajar
- Father: Naser al-Din Shah Qajar
- Mother: Khazen al-Dawlah

Tuman Agha (Persian: تومان آغا), also known as Forugh od-Dowleh (فروغ‌الدوله) and Malakeh-ye Iran (ملکه ایران, 'Queen of Iran'), was a daughter of Naser al-Din Shah Qajar and Khazen al-Dawlah. She was one of the freedom-seeking women of the Qajar era during the Constitutional Revolution. She and her husband, Ali Khan Zahir od-Dowleh, were members of the Anjoman-e Okhovat (Society of Brotherhood). Forugh od-Dowleh supported constitutionalism and openly expressed her opposition to her brother Mozaffar al-Din Shah and her nephew Mohammad Ali Shah.Zahir od-Dowleh, the husband of Forugh od-Dowleh, was the head of the Anjoman-e Okhovat (Brotherhood Society). Forugh od-Dowleh attended the meetings of the society without a veil and gave speeches there.

Forugh od-Dowleh married Ali Khan Zahir od-Dowleh in 1297 AH, when she was 18 years old. Her husband held the positions of Ishik Aghasi Bashi (chief of court ushers) and Minister of Ceremonies in the court of Naser al-Din Shah. Tuman Agha was the full sister of Fakhr al-Dowleh. In her youth, at her father's request, she married Ali Khan Qajar Zahir od-Dowleh, who served as Minister of Ceremonies at the royal court. After her marriage, she received the title “Malekeh-ye Iran” (Queen of Iran). They had three sons and four daughters, including Valiyeh Safa (Forugh al-Molk).

Regarding her character, Doust Ali Khan Mo’eyr al-Mamalek recounts that the Queen of Iran was a woman of distinction, like Fakhr al-Dowleh. Forugh od-Dowleh, taking her pen name “Safa” in honor of her husband, was a spirited, talented poet, eloquent, and witty, whose poems were several times more abundant than those of her sister, and whose words reflected purity and sincerity.

== Life ==
Turan Agha, who was one year younger than her sister Fakhr al-Dowleh (born in 1279 AH), married Mirza Ali Khan Zahir od-Dowleh in 1297 AH, before her elder sister. Zahir od-Dowleh followed the Nematollahi Sufi order, and although Forugh od-Dowleh did not initially approve of her husband's Sufi path, it is said that later she became attached and devoted to the same path. Like Fakhr al-Dowleh, Forugh od-Dowleh was placed under the guardianship of Taj al-Dawlah, one of Naser al-Din Shah's consorts, after her mother's death. Under her guidance, she was educated in knowledge, arts, literature, and other disciplines. Many of her poems and handwritten works have been preserved.

The life of the queen of Iran, despite being a daughter of Naser al-Din Shah, was not satisfactory compared to other members of the court. This may have been partly because Zahir od-Dowleh accepted governorships of various provinces to secure a better income. In this regard, Mozaffar al-Din Shah wrote a note in Shaban 1318 AH to the prime minister regarding the queen of Iran's expressed distress and ordered attention and relief for her. It may have been this promise that led to Zahir od-Dowleh's governorship of Mazandaran.

Another reason for Zahir od-Dowleh's difficult situation was that his house had been mortgaged for a period to Haji Hossein Agha Amin al-Zarb. Another notable point is the granting of the Arbāb Jamshid Garden to him by Ahmad Shah. Previously, the Eshrat Abad Garden had been designated as the residence of the Queen of Iran, but Ahmad Shah later reserved it for himself. Therefore, a letter from the Prime Minister at the time, Mohammad Vali Khan Sepahsalar, dated the 9 Hut 1334 AH, was written to the Queen of Iran, stating that: “Since the august procession of Her Excellency, A’la Dām-e Saltaneh, will move from Farah Abad Palace to Eshrat Abad Garden, His Majesty has decreed that Arbāb Jamshid Garden, which is in every way more suitable for Her Highness and her noble family than Eshrat Abad, be granted to her ownership. Additionally, 5,000 Tomans are bestowed as a gift so that she may quickly prepare her furnishings and relocate there.”

== Constitutional Revolution ==
During the Constitutional Revolution, when many courtiers fled to safe places or hoisted the flags of Ottoman, Russian, or other foreign countries at the entrance of their homes for protection, Forugh od-Dowleh remained firm in her own house and displayed the Lion and Sun flag at her doorstep. The queen of Iran personally documented the events taking place in Tehran during the revolution and sent her accounts to her husband, Zahir od-Dowleh, who was in Rasht.

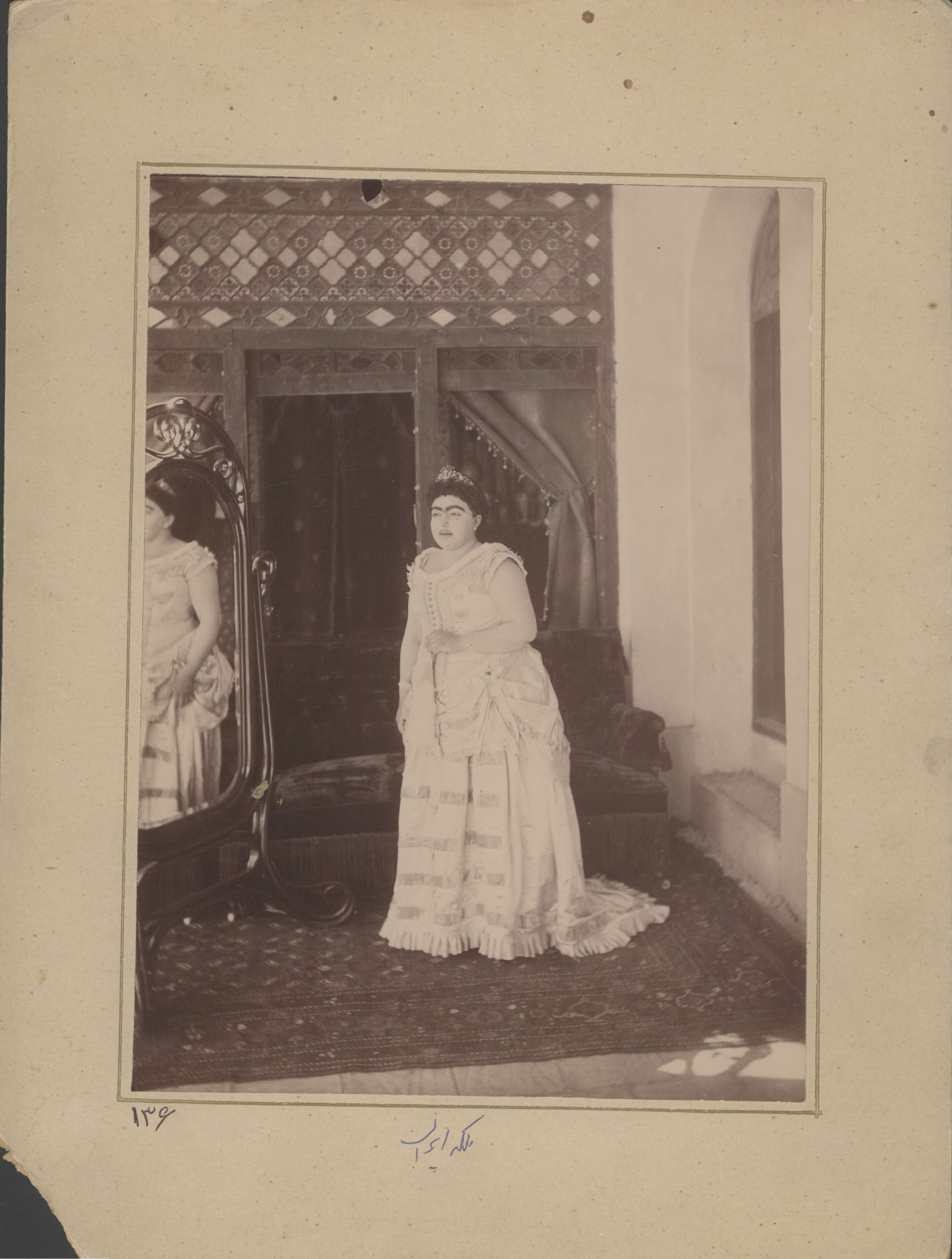
Malakeh-ye Iran in western clothing

In one of her letters, she described events such as the bombardment of the parliament by Mohammad Ali Shah and the arrest of Agha Seyyed Abdollah Behbahani and Agha Seyyed Mohammad Tabatabai, who were taken bareheaded in a carriage to the Shah's garden. She also reported the assault by the Cossacks on her own house, noting that more than a thousand Cossacks invaded their home, plundered the library and the outer mansion, tore the queen's veil from her head, and finally bombarded Zahir od-Dowleh's house, dragging the women and servants out without veils and half-naked daughters who were in the bath, while looting the princess's valuable belongings. The women who had fled to the roof could only watch their possessions being stolen. After much struggle, they escaped through another door into the street, but no household would allow them in, and eventually they were permitted to enter Atabak's house. After being searched, each sought shelter wherever possible. As a result, the queen of Iran and her daughter, Forugh al-Molk, went to the house of her other daughter, who was married to Amid od-Dowleh. During this turmoil, Mohammad Ali Shah summoned the queen of Iran, apologized, agreed to compensate for the looted property, and also assured his attention to Zahir od-Dowleh. Ultimately, the queen and her companions were taken to the house of her brother, Kamran Mirza, the Na’ib al-Saltaneh of Naser al-Din Shah, where they were received and consoled. However, reading between the lines of historical texts, it appears that, unlike her sister Fakhr al-Dowleh, Forugh od-Dowleh was not strictly bound by moral principles. She also played a prominent role in securing the release of her husband when he was arrested by agents of Mohammad Ali Shah, as well as in freeing other constitutionalists.

Amid the collection of letters printed in various books regarding the documents of Zahir od-Dowleh, the writings of the Queen of Iran stand out prominently, all demonstrating her command over family, social, and political matters."... They said I should write a note to the Shah to save Zahir al-Saltanah, to prevent him from being killed. Imagine how I feel now! I said a note to the Shah is useless at this moment. I wrote instead to Mirbahadur that I do not claim Zahir al-Saltanah is without fault, but he is young; have mercy on his youth. Send him somewhere or imprison him, do not let them kill him. I sealed the note and gave it to Gholam Reza Khan to deliver... because our people are not allowed to march with the army... I have absolutely no idea what has happened to Zahir al-Saltanah... Of course, you cannot imagine a mother's feelings at such a time."

== Politics ==
After marrying Zahir od-Dowleh, who was a freedom-minded man and a poet, Forugh od-Dowleh—like a fire boiling in a cauldron—kept voicing her protests to the shah from the sidelines. Matters reached a point where, in intense anger, she raised her voice and said, “By your plume, if you do not have him killed, I will kill him myself.” She also produced a written note and presented it to the shah. The shah frowned, paused for a few seconds, then summoned a court eunuch, gave him an order, and the eunuch departed. The next day it spread that Eqbal al-Saltaneh had suffered a stroke in the treasury at Ajoudanieh. She had begun her activities in the Anjoman-e Okhovat and among the Safi Ali Shahi dervishes, and she openly opposed her brother Mozaffar al-Din Shah and her nephew Mohammad Ali Shah, struggling alongside her husband in this cause.

Anjoman-e Okhovat

Forugh od-Dowleh was a member of the Anjoman-e Okhovat (Safi Ali Shahi dervishes) and attended its meetings without a veil, where she gave speeches. Photographs remain of Forugh od-Dowleh and her two daughters, Forugh al-Molk and Malek al-Molk, dressed in dervish attire with a kashkoul and muntasha. Forugh od-Dowleh also composed poems of praise.
