= Ali Khan Zahir od-Dowleh =

Iranian politician and scholar (1864–1924)

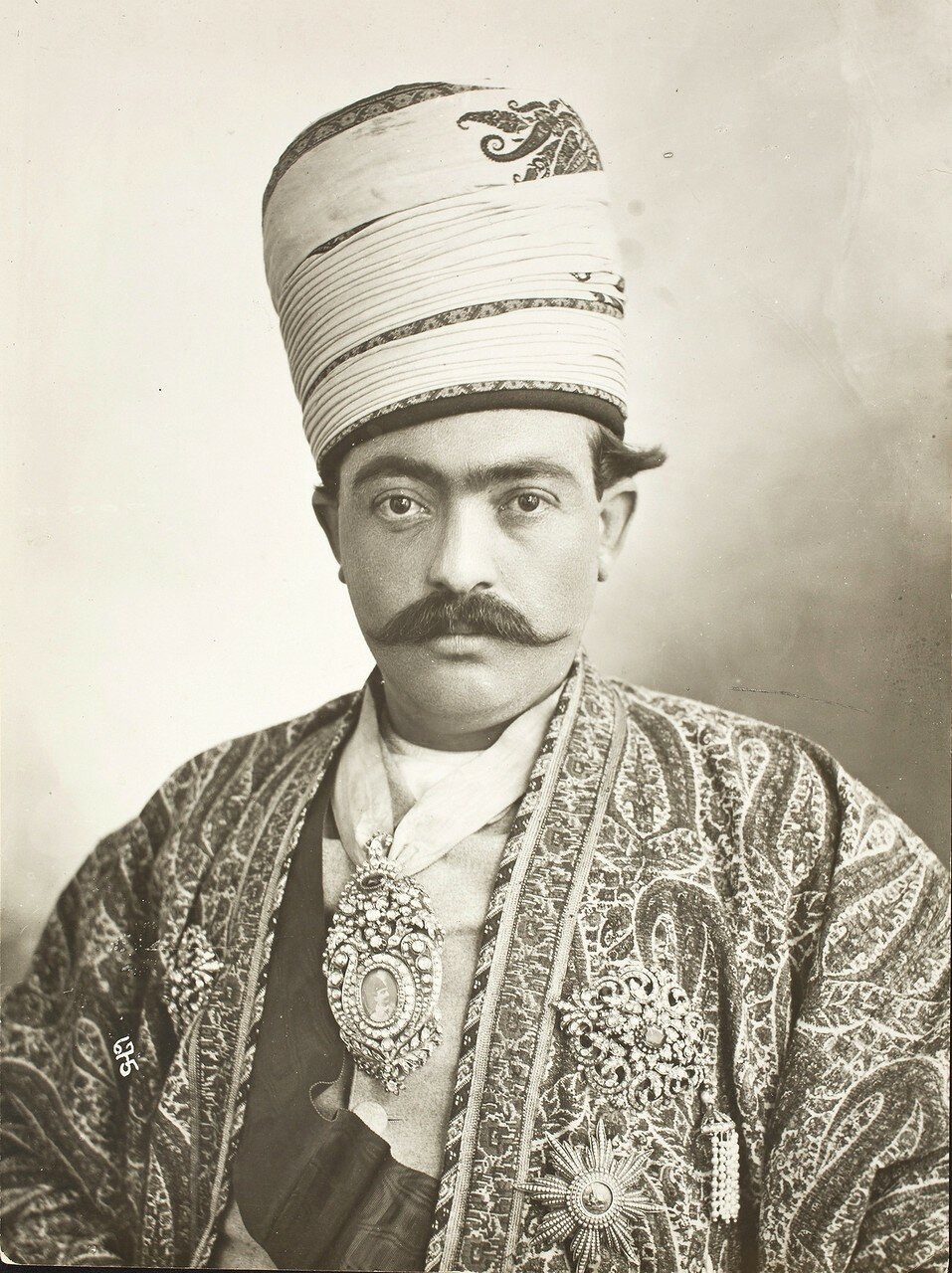
- Photograph of Zahir od-Dowleh by Antoin Sevruguin

Governor of Mazandaran
- In office 1901
- Monarch: Mozaffar ad-Din Shah Qajar

Personal details
- Born: 29 August 1864 Tehran, Qajar Iran
- Died: 1924 (aged 59–60) Tehran, Qajar Iran
- Resting place: Zahir-od-dowleh cemetery
- Spouse: Forugh od-Dowleh
- Relatives: Mohammad Naser Khan Zahir od-Dowleh (father)

Ali Khan Zahir od-Dowleh (Persian: علی‌خان ظهیرالدوله; 29 August 1864 – 1924) was an Iranian politician and scholar. A member of the Davalu clan of the Qajar tribe, he was the son of Mohammad Naser Khan Zahir od-Dowleh.

== Biography ==
After his father’s death in 1877, and due to the trust that Naser al-Din Shah had developed toward this family, Ali Khan was appointed to court service with the same title "Zahir od-Dowleh" and given the position of Minister of Ceremonies. His rank was held in such high regard that, at the age of 16, he was married to one of the Shah’s daughter Forugh od-Dowleh.

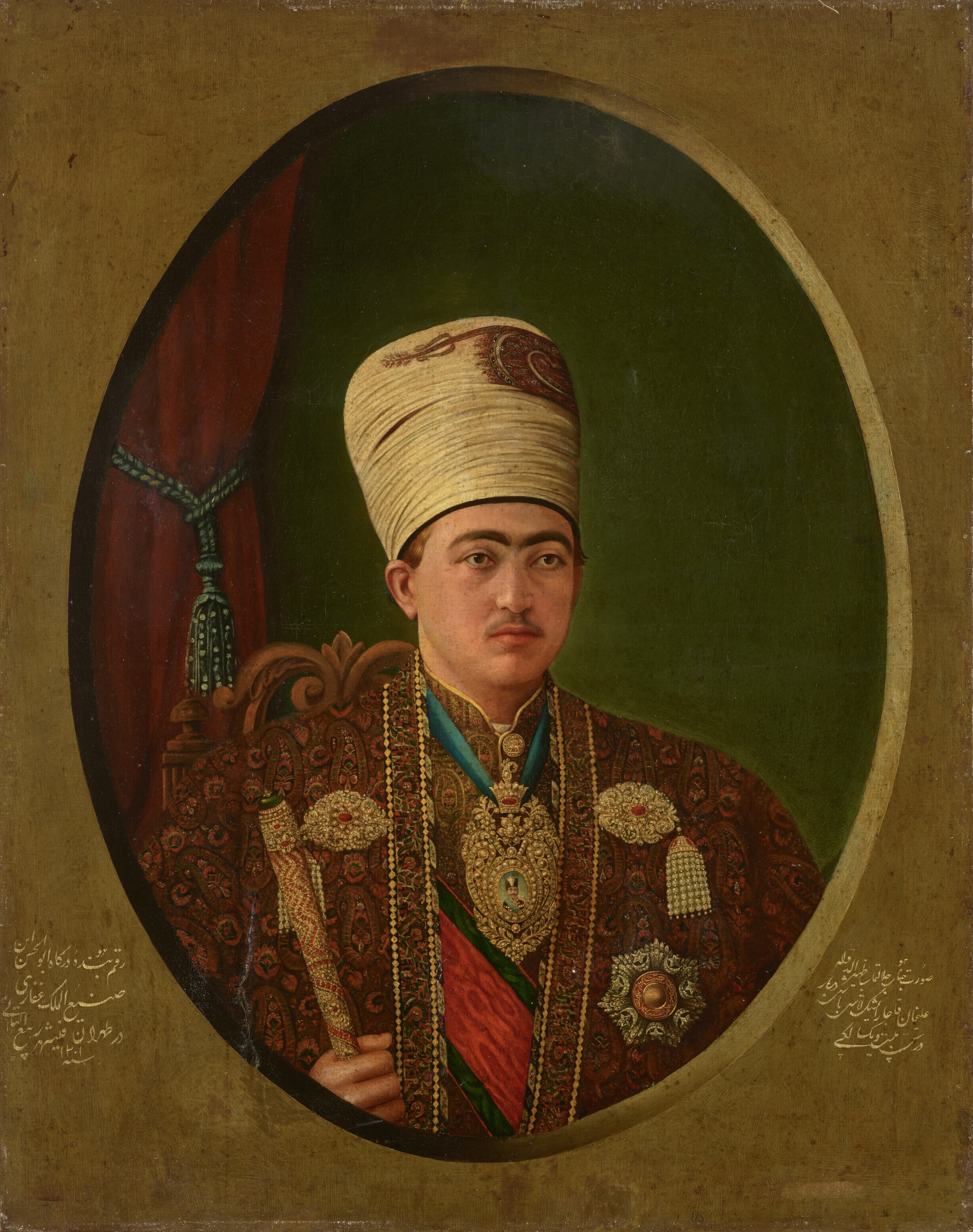
Zahir od-Dowleh by Yahya Ghaffari c. 1884

He later governed several provinces. In 1885 AH, he became a follower of Safi Ali Shah and founded the Anjoman-e Okhovat (Society of Brotherhood). With the outbreak of the Constitutional Revolution, he joined the constitutionalists. during the bombardment of the Majlis, his house was destroyed.

Zahir al-Dowleh and Forugh al-Dowleh had three sons and four daughters, including Valiyeh Safa (Forugh al-Molk, an artist, mystic, and constitutionalist) and Mohammad Naser Safa.

== Governate of Mazandaran ==
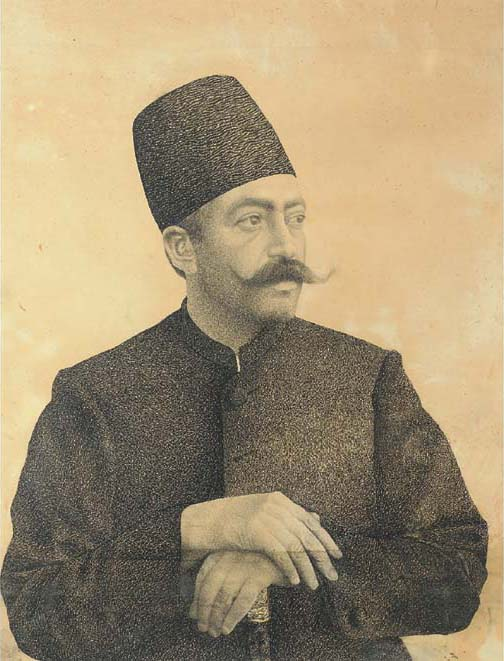
Photograph of Ali Khan Zahir od-Dowleh late 19th century

Zahir al-Dowleh was appointed governor of Mazandaran twice. His first appointment was in 1901, during the reign of Mozaffar al-Din Shah. During this period, he attempted to curb the excessive privileges of government agents and influential local figures. In Barforush, he came into conflict with a prominent cleric named Shaykh Kabir; this dispute led the Shaykh to declare Zahir al-Dowleh an apostate. As a result, supporters of both sides attacked and plundered each other’s houses, and several people were killed in the clashes. Ultimately, Zahir al-Dowleh was dismissed from his post and returned to Tehran as Minister of Ceremonies. His second appointment came during the height of the Constitutional Revolution, in the period known as the Lesser Despotism. On 4 Jumada al-Thani 1908 , Zahir al-Dowleh—who was then governor of Gilan—was appointed governor of Mazandaran. During this tenure, due to the lack of military power or support from the central government, he was unable to collect taxes, and the province descended into unrest and rebellion.

== Governate of Hamadan ==
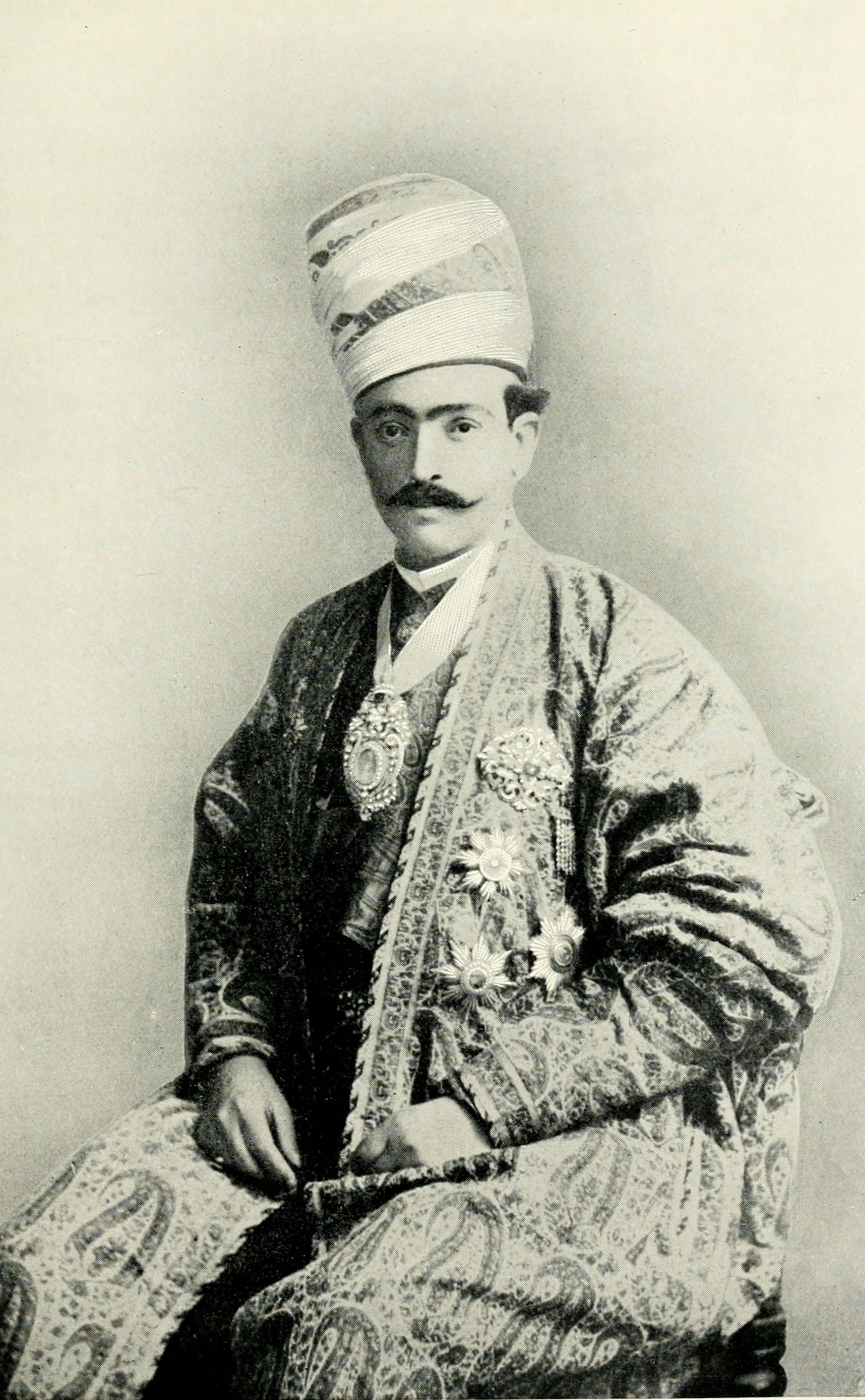
Zahir od-dowleh in 1907

Zahir od-Dowleh’s governorship of Hamadan began in 1906–1907. Among his most important measures in Hamadan—each reflecting his political outlook and his socially oriented, reformist approach—were the following:

- The establishment of the Majles-e Favayed-e Omumi (Council of Public Benefits) in Hamadan, as well as the creation of a صندوق عرایض و شکایات (petition and complaints office) for the public
- The standardization of official weights and the removal of inaccurate measures
- Efforts to combat hoarding by local khans and those responsible for rising wheat prices and famine
- The elimination of the long-standing violent factional conflicts between the Haydari and Neʿmati groups

== Death and burial ==
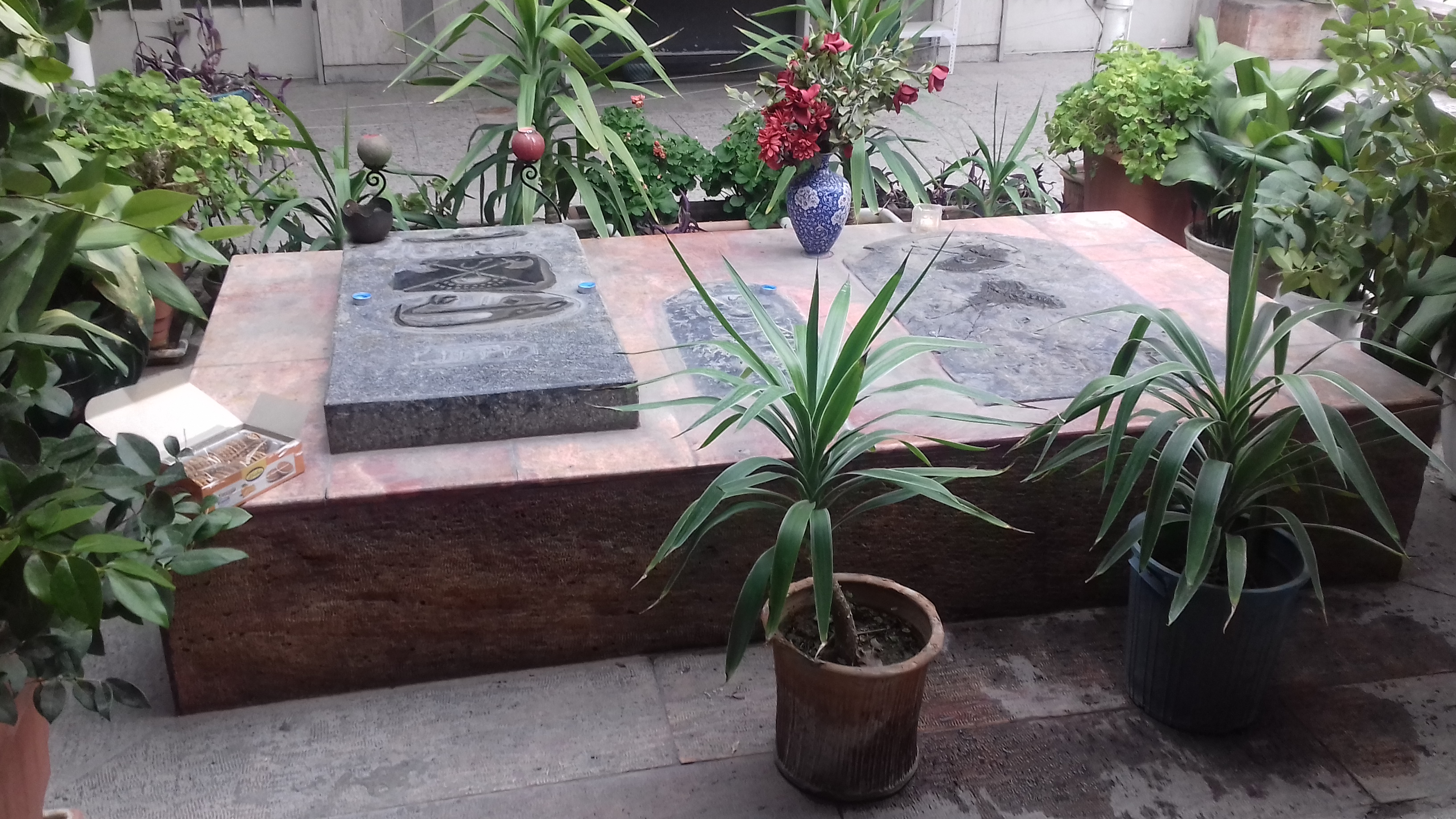
Grave of Zahir od–dowleh

He died on 29 June 1924 in Tehran. He was buried in the Zahir-od-dowleh cemetery, located between Emamzadeh Qasem and Tajrish. later years, a number of Iranian artists and notable figures were interred in his vicinity.

== Sources ==
- Hasani, Mitra Agha Mohammad (2020). "ظهیرالدوله". The Great Islamic Encyclopaedia (in Persian).
- Qaraguzlu, Gholamhossein (2007). From Ecbatana to Hamadan (in Persian). Hamadan: Zandeh-Rud Publishing.
- Momen, Abolfath (2015). "Hokmrani-ye Zahir al-Dowleh bar Mazandaran dar Dowre-ye Estebdad-e Saghir". In Ramazani Pachi, Ali (ed.). Majmu'eh-ye Maqalat-e Nokhostin Hamayesh-e Beynolmelali-ye Tarikh-e Mahalli-ye Mazandaran (in Persian). Tehran: Havazhin. ISBN 9786007546321.
