= Fulad-zereh =

Huge horned demon in the Persian story

Fulad-zereh (Persian: فولادزره, Fulâd-zereh), meaning "[possessing] steel armor", is the name of a huge horned demon in the Persian story of Amir Arsalan. Fulad-zereh made aerial wanderings and kidnapped the beautiful women he spotted, and took them to his lair.

Early in his career, he was the chief general of the fairy king, Malek Khazen, who ruled over the land of Zahrgiah.

Fulad-zereh's mother, a powerful witch in her own right, used a charm to make Fulad-zereh's body invulnerable to all weapons except the blows of the sword Shamshir-e Zomorrodnegar. At the end of the story, however, both Fulad-zereh and his mother were slain by Zoroastrian God of Spirit, Milad.

== Bibliography ==
- Mohammad-Ali Naqib-al-Mamalek, Amir Arsalan-e Rumi, ed. M. J. Mahjub, Tehran, 1340 sh./1961
- German translation: R. Gelpke as Amir Arsalan: Liebe und Abenteuer des Amir Arsalan, Zurich, 1965
