= Shamshir-e Zomorrodnegar =

Legendary Persian sword

Shamshir-e Zomorrodnegār (Persian: شمشیر زمردنگار, 'the emerald-studded sword') is a sword mentioned in the Persian epic the Shahnameh. It was said to have originally belonged to King Solomon. The witch mother of a hideous horned demon called Fulad-zereh used a charm to make his body invulnerable to all weapons except this specific sword. In the tale, the hero Amir Arsalan acquires the sword and defeats the demon.

Shamshir-e Zomorrodnegār was forged by Kāve for the legendary Persian Prince Milad. After Milad's death in the 7th story of the Shahnameh the sword was carefully guarded by Fulad-zereh, not only because it was a valuable weapon, and indeed the only weapon that could harm the demon, but also because wearing it was a charm against magic. A wound inflicted by this sword could only be treated by a special potion made from a number of ingredients, including Fulad-zereh's brain.

== In popular culture ==
The sword appears in the 2023 game Assassin's Creed Mirage as an Isu sword.
