= Amir Arsalan =

19th century Persian epic

Amir Arsalan-e Namdar (Persian: امیر ارسلان نامدار) is a Persian epic, which was told to Naser al-Din Shah Qajar, the Qajar Shah of Iran in the 19th century (though the Persian legend itself is much older), by a storyteller named Mohammad Ali Naqib ol-Mamalek (Persian: میرزا محمدعلی نقیب‌الممالک). Mohammad never transcribed the poem himself, but Princess Fakhr od‑Dowleh, the Shah's daughter—who also loved the story—eventually transcribed and preserved it for posterity.

== Plot ==
=== The birth of Arsalan ===
The epic narrates the adventures of its protagonist, Arsalan. The story begins with Khawaja Noman (Kajeh Na'man), an Egyptian merchant traveling to Hindustan by ship. On the eleventh day of the voyage, Khawaja sees an island in the distance and orders that the ship be stopped there so that he can be refreshed. While on the island he meets a beautiful woman, pregnant, and distraught with grief. Upon questioning her, Khawaja learns that she is the Queen of Rûm (Constantinople), the wife of Malik-Shah (Malekshah), the king. (Constantinople is known in Arabic and Persian as Rûm, or Roum, and so is sometimes translated as Rome.) She details the events that led to her arrival on the island. Commander Sam Khan, a vassal of the Sultan of Farang (King Petrus of the Ferangi) and his soldiers came to Constantinople by sea and killed Malik-shah, taking the throne for himself. She disguised herself as a member of the harem (in Rezvani's version, a kitchen maid). Sam Khan had all of the members of the harem arrested and transported by ship to the island where the Queen of Rûm became inadvertently marooned after the ship left without her. Khawaja proposes to her and takes her onto the ship. Instead of going forward to Hindustan, Khawaja turns the ship around and returns to Egypt, canceling his merchant trip on the pretense that the sea between Egypt and Hindustan is now unsafe due to the conquest of Constantinople by Sam Khan. Khawaja marries her there and her child, the son of Malik-Shah, is born and named Arsalan, which is a name typically reserved for royalty and means "lion". Khawaja claims the son as his own, and keeps it a secret that Arsalan is the son of Malik-shah and the Queen of Rûm.

Ansary's translation makes note throughout this segment that Khawaha is an accomplished astrologist, and that when Khawaja reads Arsalan's stars at the time of his birth, he learns that Arsalan is blessed with incredible luck and fortune. However, Rezvani's translation says nothing of astrology. It is unclear whether astrology is part of the original story or not.

=== Arsalan's childhood and his identity ===
Arsalan is given the best education and becomes fluent in seven languages by the time he is thirteen years old. When he is thirteen, he expresses an interest in horseback riding and sword fighting. Khawaja tries to discourage this, saying that such pastimes are for kings and princes and tries to convince Arsalan to pursue a career in trade, but Arsalan insists that he won't, so Khawaja relents and hires a tutor to teach Arsalan what he wants. At eighteen, Arsalan kills an aggressive lion with a sword. He then discovers the Khedive of Egypt hiding in a tree nearby, having been saved by Arsalan from certain death. The Khedive asks Arsalan to come to the palace the following day, saying that he will give him a job there.

Khawaja and Arsalan go to the palace the next day, but before the Khedive can give Arsalan a job at court, they receive word that a Ferangi delegation from King Petrus, led by Almas Khan has arrived with a letter written in the Ferangi language. Arsalan is asked to read the letter, which instructs the Khedive to hand Khawaja, as well as Arsalan, son of Malik-Shah, to Almas Khan to be taken to Farang. The letter is also accompanied by a picture of Arsalan, so that the Khedive and Khawaja could not deny that Arsalan, the son of Khawaja Noman, was not the same Arsalan mentioned in the letter. Arsalan and Almas Khan speak in the Ferangi language, which no one else present is able to understand. Almas Khan angers Arsalan, and Arsalan cuts down Almas Khan with his sword, starting an altercation that wipes out the entire Ferangi delegation. The incident is a huge diplomatic incident, and Khedive asks Khawaja to take responsibility for it, since his son is the one who caused it. Khawaja states that if he gives his wealth to Khedive, and Khedive will give him an army, then Khawaja and Arsalan will go to Constantinople and take back from Sam Khan and King Petrus the land that rightfully belongs to Arsalan.

The plot continues well on past this point.

== English translations ==
In 2019, Aziz Ansary published an English translation of the epic to Kindle and Paperback available on Amazon titled Amir Arsalan Rumi and Princess Ferokh Legha. The translation contains pictures of illustrations from some prior version of the story. It is not an unaltered translation, as the author states in the preface that he has added "many additional texts and verses added to make the story more interesting,". The title page also includes "Rendered and Retold by Aziz Ansary".

In 2020, Dariush Ahmadzadeh Rezvani published "A Concise Translation" called The Story of Prince Arsalan the Famous [Amir Arsalan Namdar], available on Kindle and Paperback from Amazon. Compared to Ansary's version, it is heavily abridged and shortened.

It is unclear which translation is closest to the original Persian, as one admits to being "concise" while the other admits to being lengthened.

== Adaptations ==
Iranian writer-director Shapur Yasami adapted the epic into a feature film in 1955, starring actor Iloosh Khooshabeh as Arsalan. This film can currently be viewed on Youtube.

The story was also adapted into an Iranian musical film in 1966 with a script written by Esmail Koushan and Mohammad Ali Fardin playing the role of Arsalan, to much success.

Arslaan, an Indian fantasy television series produced by Sagar Arts based on the epic, aired on Sony TV in 2008 and starred Neil Bhatt in the titular role of Arsalan.

From 1986 to 2017, Japanese fantasy novel author Yoshiki Tanaka adapted the story to a series of 16 novels and one side story under the title Arslan Senki or, The Heroic Legend of Arslan. The adaptation was very popular in Japan. It was adapted into two different manga series: A 1991–1996 run illustrated by Chisato Nakamura, and a 2014-present run illustrated by Hiromu Arakawa, the creator of worldwide hit Fullmetal Alchemist. Arakawa's version was adapted into an anime that garnered worldwide attention for the story. The anime covers the events of the first six of Tanaka's novels. Hiromu Arakawa's manga and the anime adaptation have both received English publications in the U.S., but neither Nakamura's manga adaptation nor Tanaka's novels have received the same treatment.

== See also ==
- Shamshir-e Zomorrodnegar
- Fulad-zereh
- Cup of Jamshid
